= List of Bienes de Interés Cultural in the Province of Las Palmas =

This is a list of Bien de Interés Cultural landmarks in the Province of Las Palmas on the Canary Islands.

== Bienes in multiple municipalities ==
Bien de interés cultural
Name of monument	BIC type	Type	Coordinates	BIC#	Date	Image
Guayadeque ravine	Archaeological zone	Canyon	27.937778°N 15.510278°W	RI-55-0000158	21 June 1991	
Los Frailes Caves (Gran Canaria)	Archaeological zone	Caves	28.055950359388326°N 15.476714488509435°W	RI-55-0000719	31 March 2009	n/a

== Bien by municipality ==
=== A ===
Agaete

Bien de interés cultural in Agaete
Name of monument	BIC type	Type	Coordinates	BIC#	Date	Image
Hermitage of Nuestra Señora de las Nieves	Monument	Religious architecture	28.101370°N 15.710711°W	RI-51-0003865	15 December 1971	
El Maipés Necropolis	Archaeological zone	Necropolis	28.096883°N 15.691199°W	RI-55-0000081	5 July 1973	

Agüimes, Las Palmas

Bien de interés cultural in Agüimes
Name of monument	BIC type	Type	Coordinates	BIC#	Date	Image
House of the Episcopal Chamber	Monument	Civil architecture Palace	27.905104°N 15.443973°W	RI-51-0008286	22 November 1996	
Caves and Promontories of Ávila	Archaeological zone	Caves	27.904557°N 15.429018°W	RI-55-0000716	4 November 2008	n/a
Cave Engravings in the Balos Ravine	Monument	Cave paintings	27.871934°N 15.477982°W	RI-51-0003912	5 July 1973	
San Sebastian parish church	Monument	Religious architecture	27.906609°N 15.446309°W	RI-51-0004478	13 March 1981	
Arinaga Saltworks	Monument	Ethnological site	27.851670°N 15.402172°W	RI-51-0010673	10 June 2008	

Antigua, Fuerteventura

Bien de interés cultural in Antigua
Name of monument	BIC type	Type	Coordinates	BIC#	Date	Image
Antigua Mill (Molino de Antigua)	Monument	Public architecture	28.430720°N 14.012519°W	RI-51-0005291	29 July 1994	n/a
San Roque Hermitage	Monument	Religious architecture	28.3825967866°N 14.0100034173°W	RI-51-0007037	13 December 1990	n/a
Nuestra Señora de Guadalupe Hermitage	Monument	Religious architecture	28.37215251°N 14.03059110°W	RI-51-0008712	20 December 1985	n/a
San Francisco Hermitage	Monument	Religious architecture	28.40389604°N 13.99229050°W	RI-51-0008713	20 December 1985	n/a
Carmen Saltworks (Salinas del Carmen)	Monument	Saltworks	28.36639479°N 13.87045383°W	RI-51-0010642	26 July 2002	n/a
Valles de Ortega mill	Monument	Public architecture	28.393511°N 14.011602°W	RI-51-0005293	29 July 1994	
San Isidro Hermitage	Monument	Religious architecture	28.43302485°N 13.97052705°W	RI-51-0007034	21 June 1991	n/a
Valles de Ortega mill (Nucleus)	Monument	Public architecture	28.389690°N 14.013402°W	RI-51-0005294	29 July 1994	
Durazno mill	Monument	Public architecture	28.422660°N 14.020706°W	RI-51-0005306	29 July 1994	
La Corte mill	Monument	Public architecture	28.410380°N 14.012751°W	RI-51-0005307	29 July 1994	
Valles de Ortega mill (Nucleus) (Calle General Moscardó)	Monument	Public architecture	28.389590°N 14.0154747°W	RI-51-0005292	29 July 1994	
Nuestra Señora de la Antigua church	Monument	Religious architecture	28.42327840°N 14.01477814°W	RI-51-0007036	19 November 1990	n/a
Village of Atalayita	Archaeological zone	ZA	28.324600°N 13.926021°W	RI-55-0000855-00001	24 May 2007	
La Guirra	Archaeological zone	Paleontological zone	28.381765°N 13.865119°W	RI-55-0000812	8 March 2005	n/a
Hornos de Cal de la Guirra	Monument	Civil architecture	28.385282°N 13.863616°W	RI-51-0009280	6 May 1999	
Fustes Castle	Monument	Civil architecture	28.393482°N 13.855264°W	RI-51-0008265	12 July 1993	n/a

Arrecife (Island of Lanzarote)

Bien de interés cultural in Arrecife
Name of monument	BIC type	Type	Coordinates	BIC#	Date	Image
Casa de los Arroyo	Monument	Civil architecture	28.958856°N 13.547640°W	RI-51-0005440	19 November 1990	n/a
San Gabriel Castle	Monument	Defense architecture	28.956399°N 13.547399°W	RI-51-0008259	12 July 1993	
San Gabriel Castle, Road and Bridge	Monument	Historical grouping	28.957712°N 13.547414°W	RI-53-0000227	16 June 1979	
San José Castle	Monument	Defense architecture	28.9707°N 13.532829°W	RI-51-0008260	12 July 1993	
San Ginés de Clermont church	Monument	Religious architecture	28.959590°N 13.547293°W	RI-51-0005448	13 December 1990	
First seat of the Lanzarote Town Council (6 Calle León y Castillo)	Monument	Civil architecture	28.958890°N 13.548203°W	RI-51-0010529	1 June 2004	n/a
Façade of Property Nos. 23 and 25 on Calle Leon y Castillo (Segarra building)	Monument	Civil architecture	28.960190°N 13.549076°W	RI-51-0010182	2 August 2005	n/a

Arucas

Bien de interés cultural in Arucas
Name of monument	BIC type	Type	Coordinates	BIC#	Date	Image
Pozos de los Desaparecidos en la Guerra Civil Española	Historic site	SH	Pozo de la Vuelta del Francés - 28.07642°N 15.312361°W; Pozo del Puente del Barranco de Arucas - 28.065438°N 15.31843°W; Pozo del Puente de Tenoya - 28.064274°N 15.30003°W; Pozo del Llano de las Brujas - 28.073154°N 15.295433°W	RI-54-0000226	29 July 2008	n/a
Conjunto Histórico Artístico Casco Antiguo de la Ciudad de Arucas	Historic group	CH	28.1184492°N 15.5232237°W	RI-53-0000211	10 October 1976	

=== B ===
Betancuria

Bien de interés cultural in Betancuria
Name of monument	BIC type	Type	Coordinates	BIC#	Date	Image
Hermitage of Santa Inés	Monument	Religious architecture	28.459578°N 14.041842°W	RI-51-0008656	24 September 1993	n/a
Conjunto Histórico Artístico la Villa	Historic Group	CH	28.424963°N 14.057310°W	RI-53-0000222	10 November 1978	n/a
Romería a la Virgen de la Peña	Historic site	SH	28.393033°N 14.071507°W	RI-54-0000208	23 April 2007	n/a
Hermitage of Nuestra Señora de la Peña	Monument	Religious architecture	28.393033°N 14.071507°W	RI-51-0008727	20 December 1985	n/a

=== F ===
Firgas

Bien de interés cultural in Firgas
Name of monument	BIC type	Type	Coordinates	BIC#	Date	Image
Finca los Dolores	Historic site	HS	28.130694°N 15.550934°W	RI-54-0000149	?	n/a
Molino de Agua	Historic site	Public architecture	28.106937°N 15.562609°W	RI-54-0000171	24 May 2007n/a	

=== G ===
Gáldar, Las Palmas

Bien de interés cultural in Gáldar
Name of monument	BIC type	Type	Coordinates	BIC#	Date	Image
Painted Cave, Galdar	Monument	Park	28.144145°N 15.655185°W	RI-51-0003880	25 May 1972	
Hermitage of San Sebastián	Monument	Religious architecture	28.144590°N 15.650496°W	RI-51-0006811	13 December 1990	n/a
Hoya de Pineda plantation	Monument	Civil architecture	28.111784°N 15.635367°W	RI-51-0006999	8 April 1994	
Casa Verde de Aguilar	Monument	Civil architecture	28.145266°N 15.658008°W	RI-51-0007003	24 September 1993	n/a
Casa del Capitán Quesada	Monument	Civil architecture	28.145621°N 15.655963°W	RI-51-0007248	13 December 1990	n/a
Hermitage of San José del Caidero	Monument	Religious architecture	28.073474°N 15.647490°W	RI-51-0008710	20 December 1985	n/a
Iglesia Matriz de Santiago de Los Caballeros	Monument	Religious architecture	28.144966°N 15.656088°W	RI-51-0008728	2 February 1986	
Botija Archaeological Site	Archaeological zone	ZA	28.131297°N 15.701868°W	RI-55-0000103	21 December 1983	n/a
La Guancha, El Agujero and Bocabarranco	Archaeological zone	ZA	28.161759°N 15.659615°W	RI-55-0000067	9 December 1949	n/a
Archaeological zone of the Patronato/Facaracas caves	Archaeological zone	ZA	28.139187°N 15.655919°W	RI-55-0000219	27 December 1990	n/a
Surroundings of the Cueva Pintada archaeological zone	Archaeological zone	ZA	28.144145°N 15.655185°W	RI-55-0000273	19 November 1990	n/a
Plaza Santiago Historic Artistic Site	Historic grouping	Civil architecture	28.1449982°N 15.6554527°W	RI-53-0000242	13 March 1981	n/a
Hondo de Abajo Canyon	Historic grouping	CH	28.043213°N 15.651602°W	RI-53-0000378	24 September 1993	n/a

=== L ===
La Aldea de San Nicolás

Bien de interés cultural in La Aldea de San Nicolás
Name of monument	BIC type	Type	Coordinates	BIC#	Date	Image
El Charco de la Aldea	Historic site	Ethnological site	28.002119°N 15.818019°W	RI-54-0000214	7 October 2008	n/a
Yacimiento Arqueológico los Caserones	Archaeological zone	ZA	28.002676°N 15.813472°W	RI-55-0000433	7 February 1986	n/a

La Oliva

Bien de interés cultural in La Oliva
Name of monument	BIC type	Type	Coordinates	BIC#	Date	Image
Castillo de El Cotillo	Monument	Defense architecture	28.679948°N 14.010599°W	RI-51-0008264	12 July 1993	
Molino de Corralejo	Monument	Public architecture	28.740040°N 13.869215°W	RI-51-0005295	29 July 1994	n/a
Molino de El Roque	Monument	Public architecture	28.679574°N 14.000623°W	RI-51-0005296	29 July 1994	
Molino de Lajares (La Oliva)	Monument	Public architecture	28.672714°N 13.941580°W	RI-51-0005297	29 July 1994	
Molina de Lajares	Monument	Public architecture	28.671952°N 13.942069°W	RI-51-0005298	29 July 1994	n/a
Molino de Villaverde	Monument	Public architecture	28.623142°N 13.915863°W	RI-51-0005299	29 July 1994	
Molina de Tindaya-tebeto	Monument	Public architecture	28.590336°N 13.993466°W	RI-51-0005300	29 July 1994	n/a
Molino de Corralejo; Plaza de la Molina	Monument	Public architecture	28.740895°N 13.869261°W	RI-51-0005287	29 July 1994	n/a
Molino de Villaverde	Monument	Public architecture	28.622443°N 13.913719°W	RI-51-0005288	29 July 1994	
Casa de los Coroneles	Monument	Civil architecture	28.606507°N 13.925165°W	RI-51-0004369	13 June 1979	
Cueva de Villaverde	Monument	Cave	n/a	RI-51-0004980	16 November 1983	n/a
Hermitage of Nuestra Señora de la Candelaria	Monument	Religious architecture	28.611209°N 13.927858°W	RI-51-0007416	24 September 1993	n/a
Hermitage of Nuestra Señora de la Caridad	Monument	Religious architecture	28.586457°N 13.978731°W	RI-51-0007417	24 September 1993	n/a
Hermitage of San Pedro y San Juan (Vallebrón)	Monument	Religious architecture	28.583106°N 13.931906°W	RI-51-0007418	24 September 1993	n/a
Hermitage of San Vicente Ferrer	Monument	Religious architecture	28.628134°N 13.904587°W	RI-51-0007031	21 June 1991	n/a
Hermitage of Nuestra Señora del Buen Viaje	Monument	Religious architecture	28.686492°N 14.008978°W	RI-51-0008726	20 December 1985	n/a
Hermitage of Nuestra Señora de Puerto Rico	Monument	Religious architecture	28.607966°N 13.927501°W	RI-51-0007035	21 June 1991	n/a
Yacimiento paleontológico del Barranco de los Encantados o Enamorados	Archaeological zone	Palaeontological zone	28.6338121°N 13.9914769°W	RI-55-0000816	22 April 2008	
Zona Arqueológica del Barranco de Tinojay	Archaeological zone	ZA	28.576032°N 13.856018°W	RI-55-0000852	13 October 2006	n/a
Zona Arqueológica El Barranco del Cavadero	Monument	Civil architecture	28.603502°N 13.850731°W	RI-55-0000835	8 April 2008	n/a
Casa del Inglés	Monument	Civil architecture	28.615272°N 13.923951°W	RI-51-0010701	13 December 2005	n/a
Hermitage of Nuestra Señora de los Dolores y San Miguel Arcángel	Monument	Ferry Bridge	28.585604°N 13.881086°W	RI-51-0011509	25 March 2008	n/a

Las Palmas de Gran Canaria

Bien de interés cultural in the city of Las Palmas
Name of monument	BIC type	Type	Coordinates	BIC#	Date	Image
Hermitage of San Antonio Abad	Monument	Religious architecture	28.10170189587851°N 15.413663758147727°W	RI-51-0010935	15 May 2007	
Cementerio Inglés	Monument	Ferry Bridge	28.089085316996538°N 15.420558142378734°W	RI-51-0012207	29 April 2010	n/a
Museo Canario	Monument	Museum	28.09957790945373°N 15.415426915792688°W	RI-51-0001342	1 March 1962	
Teatro Pérez Galdós	Monument	Civil architecture	28.103634541236865°N 15.414060790542397°W	RI-51-0006817	14 April 1994	
Capilla Anglicana	Monument	Religious architecture	28.12548569925994°N 15.431010333301415°W	RI-51-0007305	8 March 2005	n/a
Castillo de la Luz	Monument	Defense architecture	28.148644383836114°N 15.424789270012408°W	RI-51-0001107	12 July 1941	
Antigua Muralla de las Palmas de Gran Canaria	Monument	Defense architecture	28.10651584671149°N 15.421816280750273°W	RI-51-0002334	30 April 1997	
Gabinete Literario de Plaza de Cairasco Numero 1	Monument	Civil architecture	28.10315110470605°N 15.41658923563285°W	RI-51-0005166	19 April 1985	n/a
Hermitage of San Pedro González de Telmo	Monument	Religious architecture	28.108181078730503°N 15.416887154047172°W	RI-51-0004382	17 October 1979	n/a
Iglesia de San José	Monument	Religious architecture	28.094736700981027°N 15.41850658931515°W	RI-51-0004408	17 February 1980	n/a
Cathedral of Santa Ana (Canary Islands)	Monument	Religious architecture	28.10075493385113°N 15.414693287773634°W	RI-51-0003939	24 May 1974	
Archivo Histórico Provincial "Joaquín Blanco"	Archive	A	28.100260143771326°N 15.415430470370667°W	RI-AR-0000042	10 November 1997	
Biblioteca Pública del Estado	Library	B	28.11052676499274°N 15.41626690290273°W	RI-BI-0000017	25 June 1985	n/a
Iglesia de Santo Domingo de Guzmán	Monument	Religious architecture	28.09843949009065°N 15.415940430696637°W	RI-51-0006814	13 December 1990	n/a
Conjunto Histórico Artístico Barrio de la Vegueta	Historic group	CH	28.0994409°N 15.4144186°W	RI-53-0000155	5 April 1973	
Barrio de Triana	Historic group	CH	28.105331070113603°N 15.417449469785948°W	RI-53-0000386	19 November 1990	
Casas de la Mayordomía and Hermitage of San Antonio Abad	Historic group	CH	28.097635105935453°N 15.463667897081907°W	RI-53-0000443	9 June 1995	n/a
Castillo de Mata	Monument	Civil architecture	28.107128754071788°N 15.421781241311285°W	RI-51-0008261	12 July 1993	
Castillo de San Francisco	Monument	Civil architecture	28.103754°N 15.424678°W	RI-51-0008262	12 July 1993	
Castillo de San Cristóbal	Monument	Civil architecture	28.082431617589638°N 15.415214728191637°W	RI-51-0008263	12 July 1993	
Casa Museo de Pérez Galdós	Monument	Civil architecture	28.10403600879052°N 15.415979292035559°W	RI-51-0008708	20 December 1985	n/a
Templo Parroquial de San Francisco de Asís	Monument	Religious architecture	28.103481937601043°N 15.417323738797897°W	RI-51-0008709	20 December 1985	n/a
La Cueva de los Canarios	Archaeological zone	ZA	28.1616617614939°N 15.434483432984972°W	RI-55-0000405	30 September 2009	n/a
El Cementerio de Vegueta	Monument	Cemetery	28.09526313717122°N 15.413007693252425°W	RI-51-0012206	25 February 2010	n/a
Patio de los Siete Lagares	Historic site	SH	28.051272946522214°N 15.463391302585185°W	RI-54-0000058	2 June 2009	n/a

=== M ===
Mogán

Bien de interés cultural in Mogán
Name of monument	BIC type	Type	Coordinates	BIC#	Date	Image
Lomo de los Gatos Archaeological Zone	Archaeological zone	ZA	n/a	RI-55-0000280	24 September 1993	n/a
Cogolla de Venegueras Archaeological Zone	Archaeological zone	ZA	n/a	RI-55-0000387	9 May 2006	n/a
Molino Quemado	Historic site	SH	n/a	RI-54-0000172	n/a	
Cañada de la Mar Archaeological Zone	Archaeological zone	ZA	27.85330893001731°N 15.772999830897652°W	RI-55-0000389	20 June 2005	n/a

Moya

Bien de interés cultural in Moya
Name of monument	BIC type	Type	Coordinates	BIC#	Date	Image
La Montañeta	Archaeological Zone	ZA	28.121997194966898°N 15.5724218524355°W	RI-55-0000676	3 February 2009	n/a

=== P ===
Pájara

Bien de interés cultural in Pájara
Name of monument	BIC type	Type	Coordinates	BIC#	Date	Image
Nuestra Señora de Regla Hermitage	Monument	Religious architecture	28.350793°N 14.107299°W	RI-51-0008732	7 February 1986	
San Antonio Hermitage	Monument	Religious architecture	28.359505°N 14.087616°W	RI-51-0008716	20 December 1985	n/a

Puerto del Rosario

Bien de interés cultural in Puerto del Rosario
Name of monument	BIC type	Type	Coordinates	BIC#	Date	Image
San Pedro de Alcántara Hermitage	Monument	Religious architecture	28.463515°N 13.995031°W	RI-51-0007032	19 November 1990	n/a
Iglesia de Santa Ana	Monument	Religious architecture	28.491780°N 13.965405°W	RI-51-0007033	21 June 1991	n/a
Nuestra Señora de la Merced Hermitage	Monument	Religious architecture	28.550855°N 13.905453°W	RI-51-0011457	6 May 2008	n/a
Nuestra Señora del Socorro Hermitage	Monument	Religious architecture	28.559305°N 13.959094°W	RI-51-0007029	13 December 1990	n/a
Molina de la Asomada	Monument	Public architecture	28.522438°N 13.906647°W	RI-51-0005301	29 July 1994	
Molina de Puerto Lajas	Monument	Public architecture	28.531421°N 13.836902°W	RI-51-0005302	29 July 1994	n/a
Molina de Almácigo	Monument	Public architecture	28.476561°N 14.004700°W	RI-51-0005303	29 July 1994	n/a
Molino de Almácigo	Monument	Public architecture	n/a	RI-51-0005304	29 July 1994	n/a
Molino de los Llanos de la Concepción	Monument	Public architecture	28.475151°N 14.027432°W	RI-51-0005305	29 July 1994	
Molino de Tefía	Monument	Public architecture	28.525451°N 14.0056658°W	RI-51-0005289	29 July 1994	
Molino de los Llanos de la Concepción	Monument	Public architecture	28.4708641°N 14.0295112°W	RI-51-0005290	29 July 1994	
Casa de Fray Andresito	Historic site	SH	28.465712°N 13.992828°W	RI-54-0000209	25 March 2008	n/a
Iglesia Parroquial	Monument	Religious architecture	28.499058°N 13.860776°W	RI-51-0007030	19 November 1990	n/a
Santo Domingo de Guzmán Hermitage	Monument	Religious architecture	28.531915°N 13.935902°W	RI-51-0008714	20 December 1985	n/a
San Agustín Hermitage	Monument	Religious architecture	28.521935°N 13.989350°W	RI-51-0008715	20 December 1985	n/a
Nuestra Señora de La Concepción Hermitage	Monument	Religious architecture	28.475221°N 14.030231°W	RI-51-0008717	20 December 1985	n/a

=== S ===
San Bartolomé

Bien de interés cultural in San Bartolomé
Name of monument	BIC type	Type	Coordinates	BIC#	Date	Image
Iglesia de San Bartolomé	Monument	Religious architecture	29.001564938748835°N 13.613671372550497°W	RI-51-0010739	30 April 2003	
Casa del Mayor Guerra	Monument	Civil architecture	28.998047601894186°N 13.61867031353336°W	RI-51-0008743	14 March 1986	

San Bartolomé de Tirajana

Bien de interés cultural in San Bartolomé de Tirajana
Name of monument	BIC type	Type	Coordinates	BIC#	Date	Image
Cementerio de la Villa	Historic group	CH	27.923300897851778°N 15.575416099055746°W	RI-51-0006972	22 November 1996	n/a
Necrópolis de Arteara	Archaeological zone	ZA	27.8456383°N 15.5692868°W	RI-55-0000082	5 July 1973	n/a
El Llanillo	Archaeological zone	ZA	27.757129318426315°N 15.66022004851528°W	RI-55-0000228	13 June 1994	n/a
Yacimiento Arqueológico los Caserones de Fataga	Archaeological zone	ZA	27.863089°N 15.559119°W	RI-55-0000434	14 March 1986	n/a
Lomo Galeón Archaeological zone	Archaeological zone	ZA	27.75684827297973°N 15.663583846626011°W	RI-55-0000224	21 June 1991	n/a
Faro de Maspalomas	Monument	Lighthouse	27.735127597840332°N 15.598931490358812°W	RI-51-0006973	12 April 2005	

Santa Brigida

Bien de interés cultural in Santa Brigida
Name of monument	BIC type	Type	Coordinates	BIC#	Date	Image
Hermitage of la Concepción	Monument	Religious architecture	28.025633803770866°N 15.48727717759858°W	RI-51-0004350	5 April 1979	n/a
Cuevas de La Angostura	Archaeological zone	ZA	28.0522931134578°N 15.483649296553057°W	RI-55-0000382	23 June 2009	n/a
Casco Histórico de Santa Brígida	Historic group	CH	28.0337963°N 15.4998362°W	RI-53-0000530	16 December 2010	

Santa Lucía de Tirajana

Bien de interés cultural in Santa Lucía de Tirajana
Name of monument	BIC type	Type	Coordinates	BIC#	Date	Image
Molino de aceite de el Valle	Historic site	Ethnological site	27.914268344093692°N 15.536712928258199°W	RI-54-0010555	12 June 2007	n/a
Salinas de Tenefé	Ethnological site	Traditional Salina	27.814501°N 15.422553°W	RI-51-0010674	26 May 2005	n/a
Grabados Rupestres de La Era del Cardón	Archaeological zone	ZA	27.870402106519357°N 15.498365737106568°W	RI-55-0000892	3 February 2009	n/a

Santa María de Guía de Gran Canaria

Bien de interés cultural in Santa María de Guía de Gran Canaria
Name of monument	BIC type	Type	Coordinates	BIC#	Date	Image
Iglesia Parroquial de Santa María	Monument	Religious architecture	28.13897546198966°N 15.604431516808349°W	RI-51-0004510	24 July 1981	n/a
Conjunto Histórico Artístico Casco Antiguo de la Ciudad de Santa María de Guía	Historic group	CH	28.139290422229998°N 15.632605014643731°W	RI-53-0000263	27 August 1982	n/a
Cenobio de Valeron	Archaeological zone	ZA	28.13897546198966°N 15.604431516808349°W	RI-51-0004295	14 October 1978	
Tagoror del Gallego	Archaeological zone	ZA	28.14057417544292°N 15.605306767655776°W	RI-55-0000298	13 December 1990	n/a
Casa Natal del Canónigo Gordillo	Monument	Civil architecture	28.13810009404519°N 15.62998809825213°W	RI-51-0008285	19 March 2001	n/a

=== T ===
Teguise

Bien de interés cultural
Name of monument	BIC type	Type	Coordinates	BIC#	Date	Image
Castillo de Santa Bárbara	Monument	Defense architecture	29.057857°N 13.550156°W	RI-51-0008266	12 July 1993	
Hermitage of San Rafael	Monument	Religious architecture	29.064459268323642°N 13.567135497802223°W	RI-51-0010731	18 September 2001	n/a
Iglesia Matriz de Nuestra Señora de Guadalupe	Monument	Religious architecture	29.059432°N 13.559764°W	RI-51-0004342	20 February 1979	
Town of Teguise	Historic group	Artistic historic group	29.059869°N 13.560362°W	RI-53-0000234	21 November 1980	
Yacimiento Arqueológico de Zonzamas con queseras y construcciones ciclópeas	Archaeological zone	ZA	29.012964172383665°N 13.570708300330471°W	RI-55-0000094	27 April 1979	n/a
Punta Delgada Lighthouse	Monument	Public architecture	29.403299377683975°N 13.488490265872395°W	RI-51-0010731	20 December 2002	n/a

Telde

Bien de interés cultural in Telde
Name of monument	BIC type	Type	Coordinates	BIC#	Date	Image
Casa de Doña Dolores Sall	Monument	Civil architecture	n/a	RI-51-0010990	22 November 2002	n/a
Yacimiento Arqueológico de Cuatro Puertas	Archaeological zone	ZA	n/a	RI-55-0000080	25 May 1972	
Barranco de Silva	Archaeological zone	ZA	27.966667°N 15.383333°W	RI-55-0000417	24 September 1993	n/a
Ruins of the prehistoric village of Tufia	Archaeological zone	ZA	n/a	RI-55-0000083	5 July 1973	
Yacimiento Arqueológico "La Restinga"	Archaeological zone	ZA	n/a	= RI-55-0000282	21 June 1991	n/a
Iglesia de San Pedro Mártir	Monument	Religious architecture	n/a	RI-51-0004473	26 February 1981	n/a
Basílica de San Juan Bautista	Monument	Religious architecture	n/a	RI-51-0007028	21 June 1991	
Sima de Jinámar	Historic site	SH	n/a	RI-54-0000092	30 April 1996	n/a
Hermitage of San José de las Longueras	Monument	Religious architecture	n/a	RI-51-0007249	19 November 1990	n/a
Conjunto Histórico Artístico Barrios de San Juan y San Francisco	Historic group	CH	n/a	RI-53-0000241	6 March 1981	n/a
Montaña de Las Huesas	Archaeological zone	ZA	27.979586615988776°N 15.401835407452527°W	RI-55-0000218	17 April 2001	n/a

Teror

Bien de interés cultural in Teror
Name of monument	BIC type	Type	Coordinates	BIC#	Date	Image
Basilica of Nuestra Señora del Pino	Historic group	CH	n/a	RI-51-0004241	10 December 1976	
Conjunto Histórico Artístico El Casco Antiguo	Historic group	CH	n/a	RI-53-0000225	13 February 1979	

Tinajo

Bien de interés cultural in Tinajo
Name of monument	BIC type	Type	Coordinates	BIC#	Date	Image
Hermitage of los Dolores and Aljibe	Monument	Religious architecture	29.043871°N 13.681694°W	RI-51-0010741	12 May 2003	
Iglesia de San Roque	Monument	Religious architecture	29.066739°N 13.676653°W	RI-51-0010496	12 May 2003	n/a
Tinajo	Historic site	SH	29.066169°N 13.677091°W	RI-54-0000150	12 May 2003	n/a

Tuineje

Bien de interés cultural
Name of monument	BIC type	Type	Coordinates	BIC#	Date	Image
Molino de Tiscamanita	Monument	Public architecture	28.353774°N 14.038190°W	RI-51-0005308	29 July 1994	n/a
San José Hermitage	Monument	Religious architecture	28.280624°N 14.110355°W	RI-51-0011071	18 December 2007	n/a
Molino de Tiscamanita	Monument	Public architecture	28.353114°N 14.035426°W	RI-51-0005309	29 July 1994	
Hermitage of San Marcos	Monument	Religious architecture	28.351494°N 14.037040°W	RI-51-0011094	11 December 2007	n/a
Iglesia de San Miguel	Monument	Religious architecture	28.325553°N 14.049193°W	RI-51-0008730	7 February 1986	n/a

=== V ===
Vega de San Mateo

Bien de interés cultural in Vega de San Mateo
Name of monument	BIC type	Type	Coordinates	BIC#	Date	Image
Molino de los Barber	Historic group	CH	n/a	RI-53-0000539	23 October 2007	n/a

=== Y ===
Yaiza

Bien de interés cultural in Yaiza
Name of monument	BIC type	Type	Coordinates	BIC#	Date	Image
Faro de Pechiguera	Monument	Public architecture	28.855559°N 13.872343°W	RI-51-0010917	20 December 2002	
Castillo de San Marcial de Rubicón de Femes o las Coloradas	Monument	Civil architecture	28.8558752°N 13.8108015°W	RI-51-0008267	12 July 1993	
Castillo del Rubicón	Monument	Civil architecture	n/a	RI-51-0008268	12 July 1993	n/a
Iglesia de San Marcial de Rubicón	Monument	Religious architecture	n/a	RI-51-0008711	20 December 1985	n/a
Iglesia de Nuestra Señora de los Remedios	Monument	Religious architecture	n/a	RI-51-0008733	7 February 1986	n/a
Casa Natal de Benito Pérez Armas	Monument	Civil architecture	n/a	RI-51-0008695	November	n/a
