= Punta Delgada Lighthouse =

Lighthouse on Alegranza, Spain

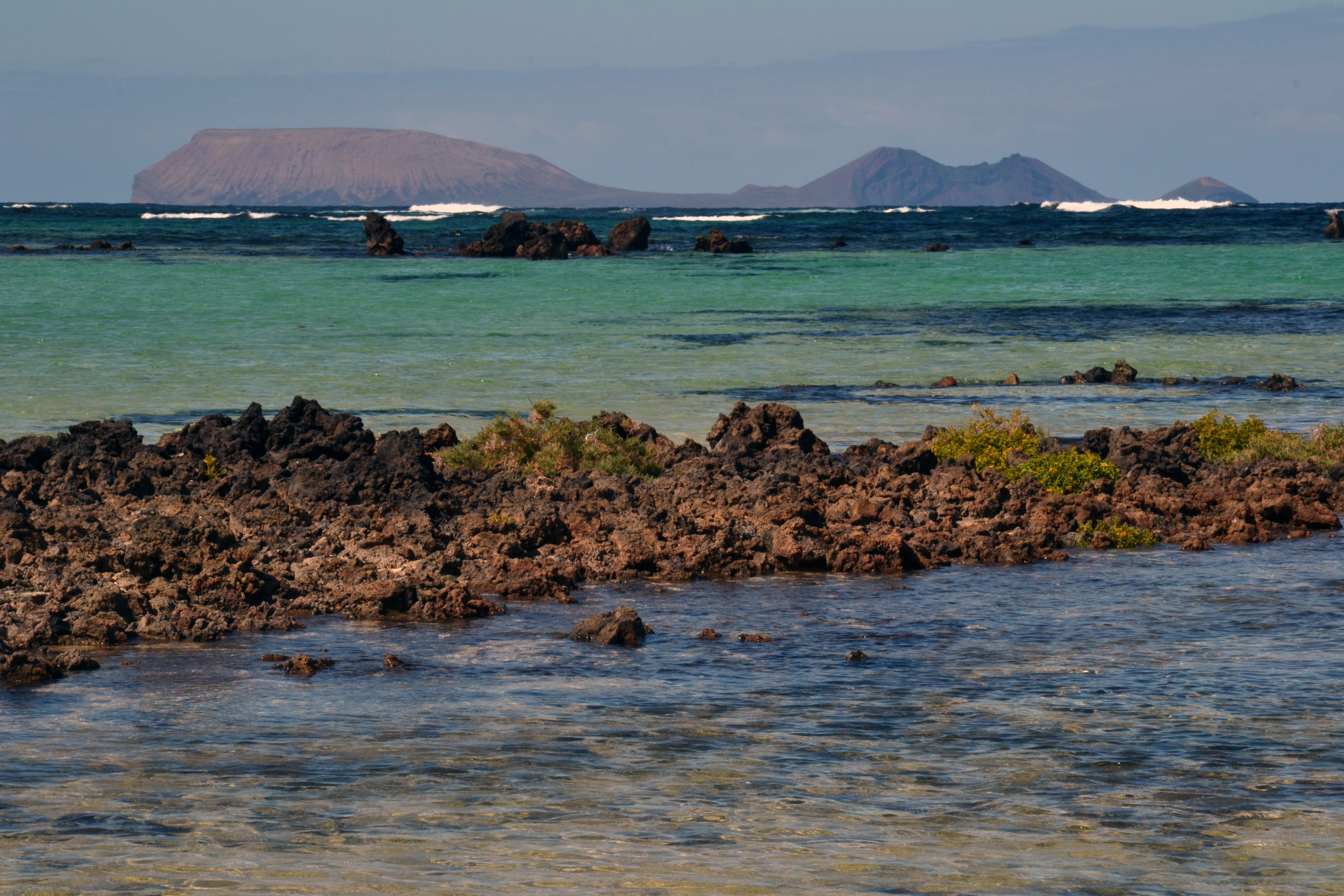
- View of Alegranza Island
- Location: Alegranza, Canary Islands, Spain
- Coordinates: 29.40329°N 13.48855°W

Tower
- Constructed: 1865
- Height: 15 metres (49 ft)
- Shape: cylindrical tower
- Heritage: Bien de Interés Cultural

Light
- First lit: 1865
- Focal height: 17 metres (56 ft)
- Range: 12 nautical miles (22 km; 14 mi)
- Characteristic: Fl W 3s

Punta Delgada or Alegranza Lighthouse (Spanish: Faro de Punta Delgada o Faro de Alegranza) is an active 19th century lighthouse on the Spanish island of Alegranza in the Canary islands. Alegranza lies to the north of the larger island of Lanzarote, it is part of the Chinijo Archipelago within the Teguise municipality.

== History ==
Punta Delgada was one of the first lighthouses to be completed as part of the original maritime lighting plan for the Canaries. Designed by the engineer Juan de León y Castillo, building began in 1861 and it became operational in 1865.

Built in a neo-classical style similar to other Canarian 19th century lighthouses, it consists of a whitewashed single storey building with dark volcanic rock used for the masonry detailing, located on a headland at the eastern end of Alegranza The light is displayed from a lantern room at the top of a 15-metre-high (49 ft) masonry tower, attached to the seaward side of the main building.

The lighthouse was designed to accommodate the two keepers and their families and has a central courtyard or patio. In the centre of the courtyard is a cistern that collects the rainfall from the roof of the buildings. This was insufficient to cater to the two families due to the low frequency of rainfall on the island, so a well was also built 20 meters from the lighthouse to collect and store water from the mountain.

Both the keeper's house and the tower are part of the architectural heritage of the Canary Islands and were declared a monument of cultural interest Bien de Interés Cultural in 2002 and included in the listing for Las Palmas. The lighthouse is maintained by the Port authority of the Province of Las Palmas. It is registered under the international Admiralty number D2772 and has the NGA identifier of 113–24076.

== See also ==
- List of lighthouses in the Canary Islands
- List of lighthouses in Spain
- Punta Delgada, Argentina
- Punta Delgada, Chile
