= Morro Velosa =

Coordinates: 28.43854°N 14.05007°W

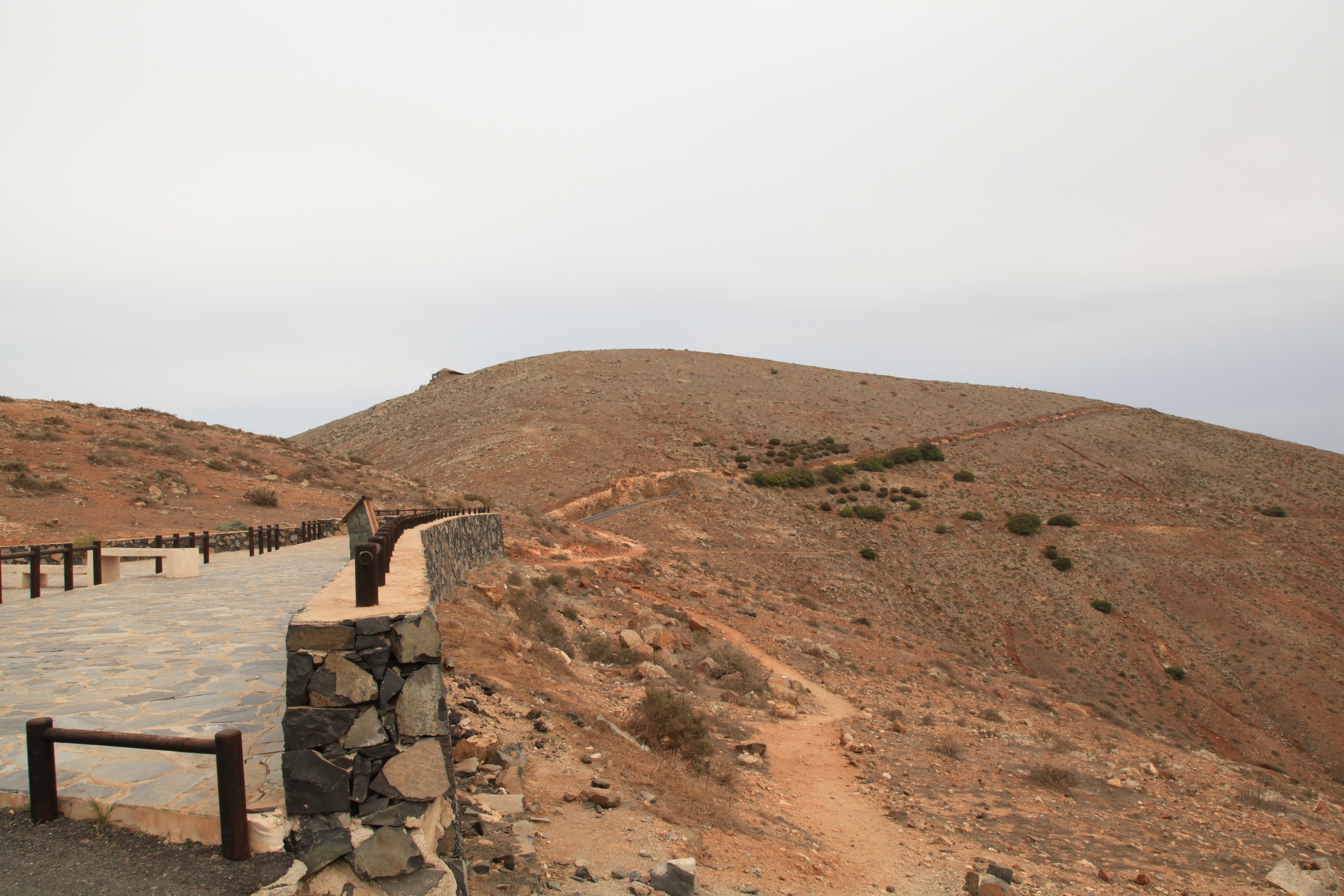
Morro Velosa lookout

Morro Velosa is a scenic viewpoint on the Canary Island of Fuerteventura, Spain. The so-called “Mirador Morro Velosa” allows visitors to observe the northern area of the island, including the dunes of Corralejo, the villages of el Cotillo, and Antigua. Artist and architect César Manrique designed the Morro Velosa lookout, which features a snack bar, gardens, information on the geology of Fuerteventura, and a scale model of the volcanic island. Morro Velosa, situated on the Tegú Mountain with a height of approximately 645 meters, is located between the protected Betancuria Rural Park and the Valle de Santa Inés. There is another scenic viewpoint about one kilometer to the north, called “Mirador de Guise y Ayose”. This viewpoint includes two statues of Fuerteventura’s former kings (Guise and Ayose).

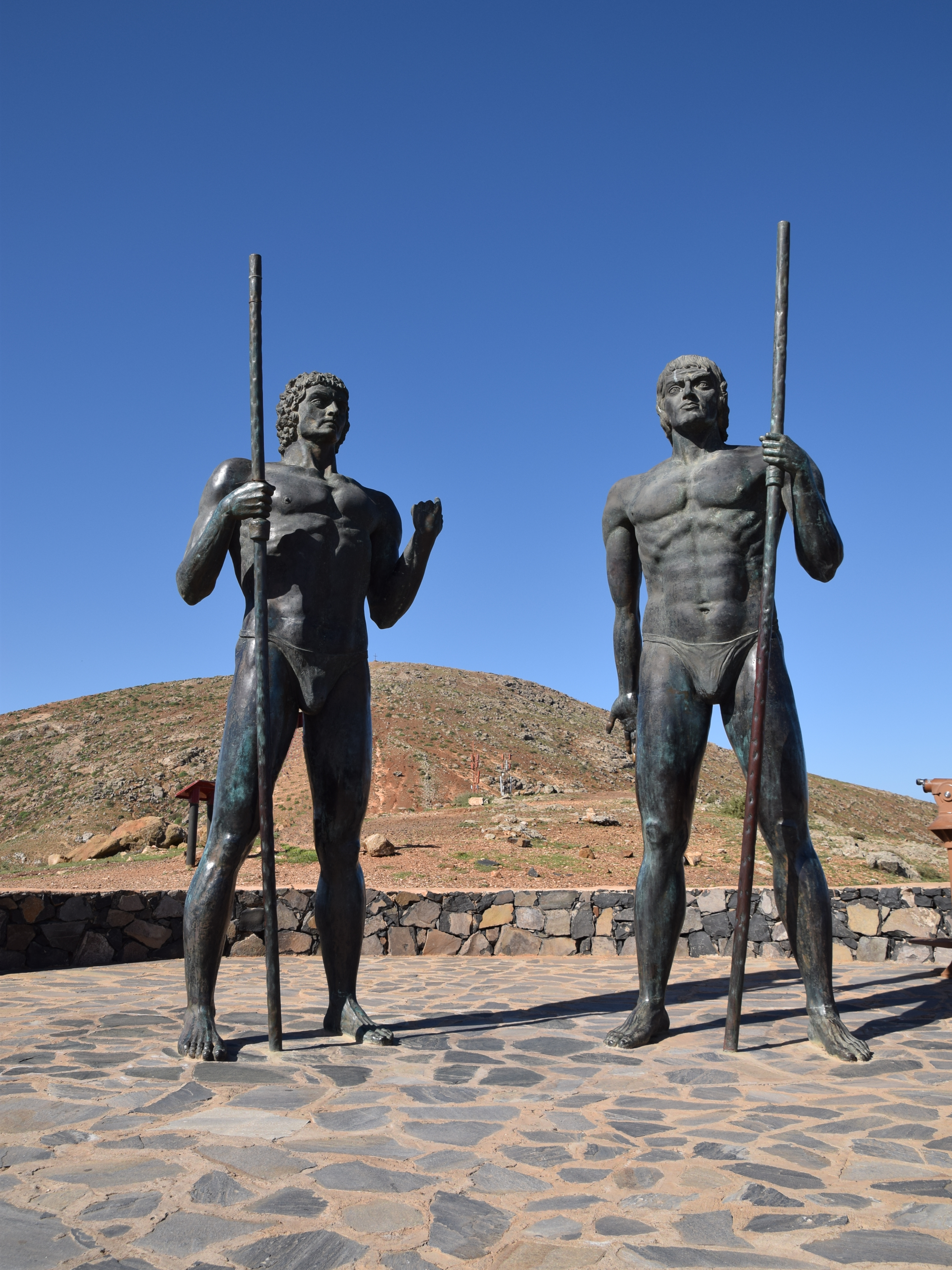
The statues of Guize and Ayose
