= List of municipalities in Las Palmas =

Map of Spain with the province of Las Palmas highlighted

Gran Canaria, Municipalities (and zones)

This is a list of the 34 municipalities in the province of Las Palmas in the autonomous community of the Canary Islands, Spain. There are 21 municipalities on the island of Gran Canaria, six on the island of Fuerteventura and seven on the island of Lanzarote.

The island of La Graciosa and the rest of the Chinijo Archipelago are part of the municipality of Teguise (Lanzarote); Lobos Island is part of the municipality of La Oliva (Fuerteventura).

It is the province of Spain with the least divided municipalities.

== List ==
Name	Island	Area (km^{2})	Census Population (2001)	Census Population (2011)	Census Population (2021)	Estimated Population (2023)
Agaete	Gran Canaria	45.50	5,202	5,735	5,692	5,593
Agüimes	Gran Canaria	79.28	20,124	29,641	32,320	32,797
Artenara	Gran Canaria	66.70	1,319	1,252	1,049	1,036
Arucas	Gran Canaria	33.01	32,466	36,771	38,559	38,655
Firgas	Gran Canaria	15.77	6,865	7,607	7,526	7,701
Gáldar	Gran Canaria	61.59	22,154	24,358	24,493	24,728
Ingenio	Gran Canaria	38.15	24,439	30,022	31,856	32,356
Mogán	Gran Canaria	172.44	12,444	22,847	20,527	20,938
Moya	Gran Canaria	31.87	8,137	8,043	7,841	7,887
La Aldea de San Nicolás	Gran Canaria	123.58	7,668	8,522	7,518	7,523
Las Palmas de Gran Canaria	Gran Canaria	100.55	354,863	381,271	380,667	380,863
San Bartolomé de Tirajana	Gran Canaria	333.13	34,515	53,440	53,429	54,668
Santa Brígida	Gran Canaria	23.81	17,598	18,878	18,272	18,598
Santa Lucía de Tirajana	Gran Canaria	61.56	47,652	66,725	73,921	76,418
Santa María de Guía de Gran Canaria	Gran Canaria	42.59	13,893	14,149	13,886	13,971
Tejeda	Gran Canaria	103.30	2,400	2,136	1,874	1,846
Telde	Gran Canaria	102.43	87,949	101,080	103,175	103,240
Teror	Gran Canaria	25.70	12,042	12,857	12,683	12,831
Valleseco	Gran Canaria	22.11	3,949	3,896	3,779	3,766
Valsequillo de Gran Canaria	Gran Canaria	39.15	7,964	9,118	9,416	9,693
Vega de San Mateo	Gran Canaria	37.89	6,979	7,737	7,655	7,785
Gran Canaria Island	Totals	1,560.11	730,622	846,085	856,137	862,893
Antigua	Fuerteventura	250.56	5,519	10,391	12,782	13,513
Betancuria	Fuerteventura	103.64	685	770	755	811
La Oliva	Fuerteventura	356.13	10,548	22,827	27,503	29,174
Pájara	Fuerteventura	383.52	12,382	19,773	20,892	21,130
Puerto del Rosario	Fuerteventura	289.95	21,296	35,878	41,852	43,493
Tuineje	Fuerteventura	275.94	9,843	13,302	15,494	16,031
Fuerteventura Island	Totals	1,659.74	60,273	102,941	119,278	124,152
Arrecife	Lanzarote	22.72	44,980	55,381	64,278	64,735
Haría	Lanzarote	106.59	4,027	5,054	5,395	5,543
San Bartolomé	Lanzarote	40.89	13,030	18,118	19,305	19,443
Teguise	Lanzarote	263.98	12,392	20,294	22,976	23,788
Tías	Lanzarote	64.61	12,820	19,148	20,469	21,296
Tinajo	Lanzarote	135.28	4,512	5,738	6,441	6,725
Yaiza	Lanzarote	211.85	5,020	14,468	17,080	17,268
Lanzarote Island	Totals	845.92	96,781	138,201	155,944	158,798

== See also ==
- Geography of Spain
- List of cities in Spain
- List of municipalities in Santa Cruz de Tenerife
