= Province of Canary Islands =

Canary Islands Province Provincia de Canarias
- Province
- Flag

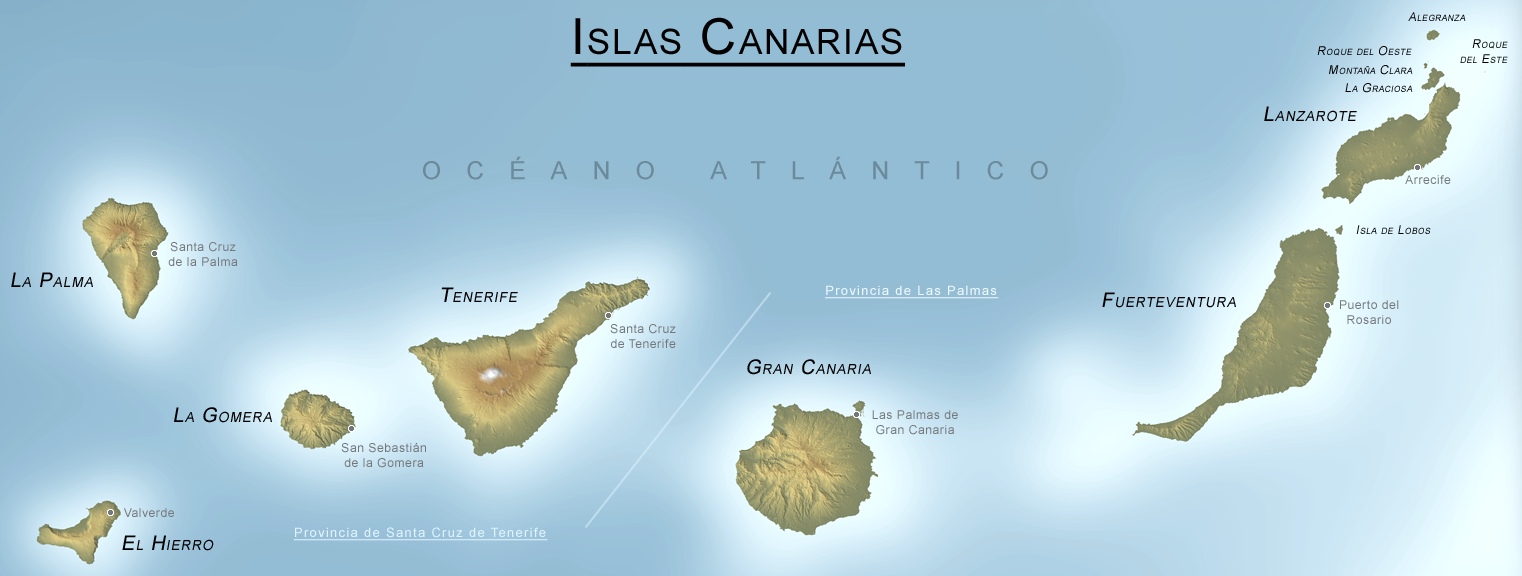
- Map of Spain with Province of Canary Islands highlighted
- Country: Spain
- Capital: Santa Cruz de Tenerife

Area
  - Total: 7,447 km^{2} (2,875 sq mi)
  - Rank: Ranked
- Elevation (Teide): 3,718 m (12,198 ft)
  - Rank: Ranked
- Official language(s): Spanish
- Parliament: Cortes Generales

The Province of Canary Islands (in Spanish: Provincia de Canarias) is the name of the former province formed by the Canary Islands. This province had its capital in the city of Santa Cruz de Tenerife. After the provincial division in 1927, this province was composed of the province of Santa Cruz de Tenerife that encompassed the western islands of the Canaries, while the province of Las Palmas covered the eastern islands.

== History ==
On November 30, 1833 the province of the Canary Islands was created, which the Cadiz Constitution of 1812 established with its capital in Santa Cruz de Tenerife. However, there arose a rivalry with the island of Gran Canaria, due to the fact that the capital was established on the island of Tenerife, although so far, the city exercised for three centuries as de facto capital of the Canary Islands was the city of San Cristóbal de La Laguna located in Tenerife.

In 1912, there was created Ley de Cabildos (The Law of Town Halls) to try to satisfy both sides. This did not please those who asked for the provincial division, especially from Gran Canaria, and those who advocated regional autonomy, mostly from Tenerife.

In 1927, during the dictatorship of General Primo de Rivera until then province of the Canary Islands was divided into two: the eastern half would result in the Province of Las Palmas, leaving the western called since then with the name of Province of Santa Cruz de Tenerife. From here, the capital of the archipelago would be shared between the cities of Santa Cruz de Tenerife and Las Palmas de Gran Canaria, which is how it remains today.

It is the only province that has been divided from the project, raising the number of provinces from 49 to the 50 that currently exist in Spain.
