= Firgas =

- Municipality
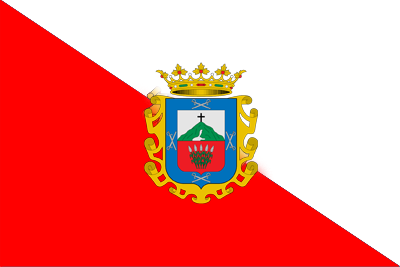
- Flag Coat of arms

- Municipal location in Gran Canaria

- Location in the province of Las Palmas Firgas (Canary Islands) Firgas (Spain, Canary Islands)
- Coordinates: 28°6′20″N 15°33′50″W
- Country: Spain
- Autonomous Region: Canary Islands
- Province: Las Palmas
- Island: Gran Canaria

Area
  - Total: 15.77 km^{2} (6.09 sq mi)
- Elevation: 500 m (1,600 ft)

Population (2025-01-01)
  - Total: 7,728
  - Density: 490.0/km^{2} (1,269/sq mi)
- Time zone: UTC+0 (GMT)

Firgas is a town and a municipality in the northern part of the island of Gran Canaria, in the Province of Las Palmas, in the Canary Islands. Its population is 7,628 (2013), and its area is 15.77 km^{2} (6.09 sq mi). Firgas was founded in 1488, and it is situated in the mountains, 13 km west of Las Palmas. The town, which is located in a green and rural zone, is also known as the balcony of the Atlantic, as it provides good views of the northern coast of the island. Bottled water is produced in the town.

== Historical population ==
Historical population

Year	Pop.	±%
1991	5,735	—
1996	6,526	+13.8%
2001	6,865	+5.2%
2002	6,927	+0.9%

Year	Pop.	±%
2003	7,023	+1.4%
2004	7,060	+0.5%
2013	7,628	+8.0%

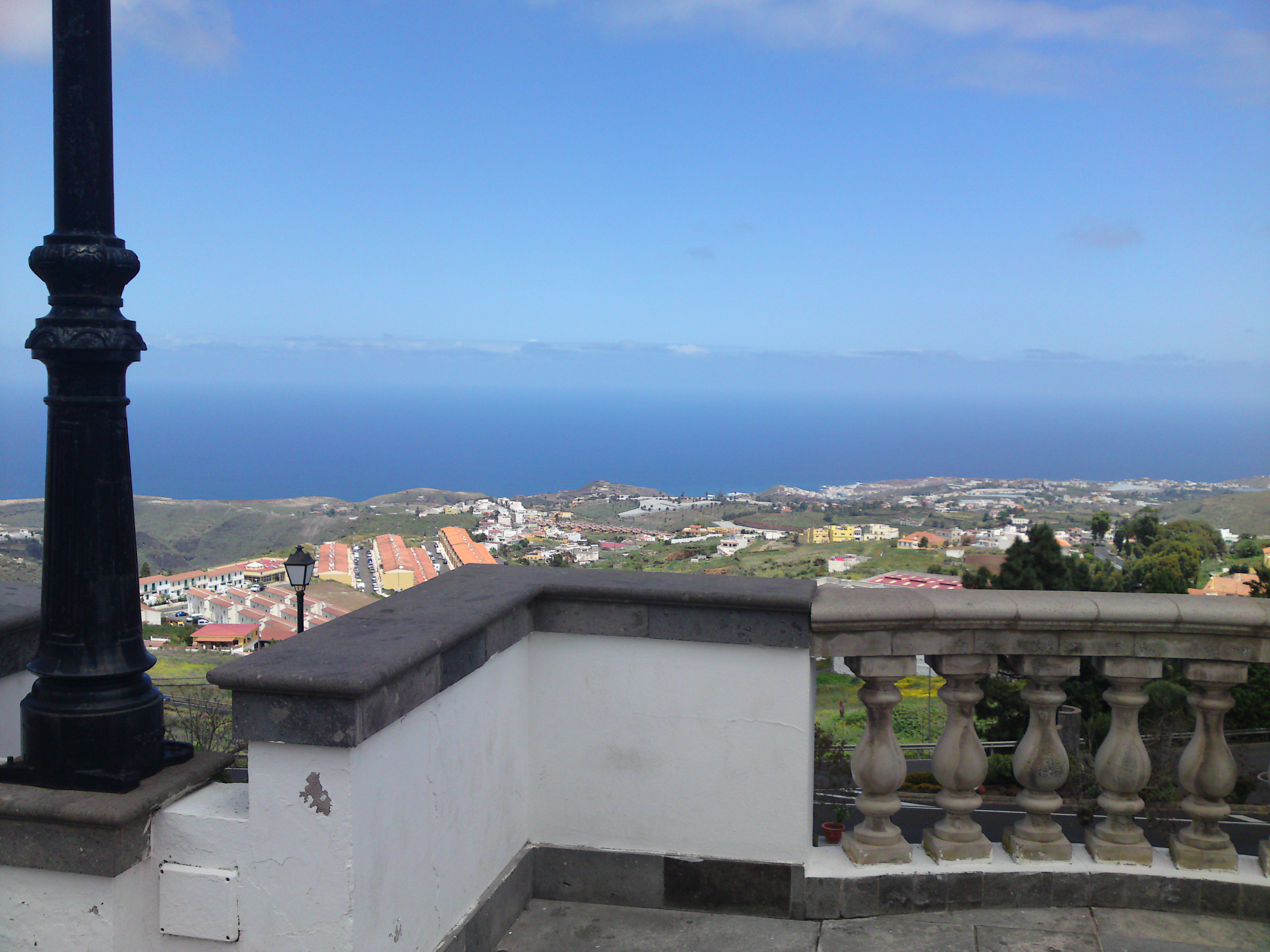
View from the San Roque town square.

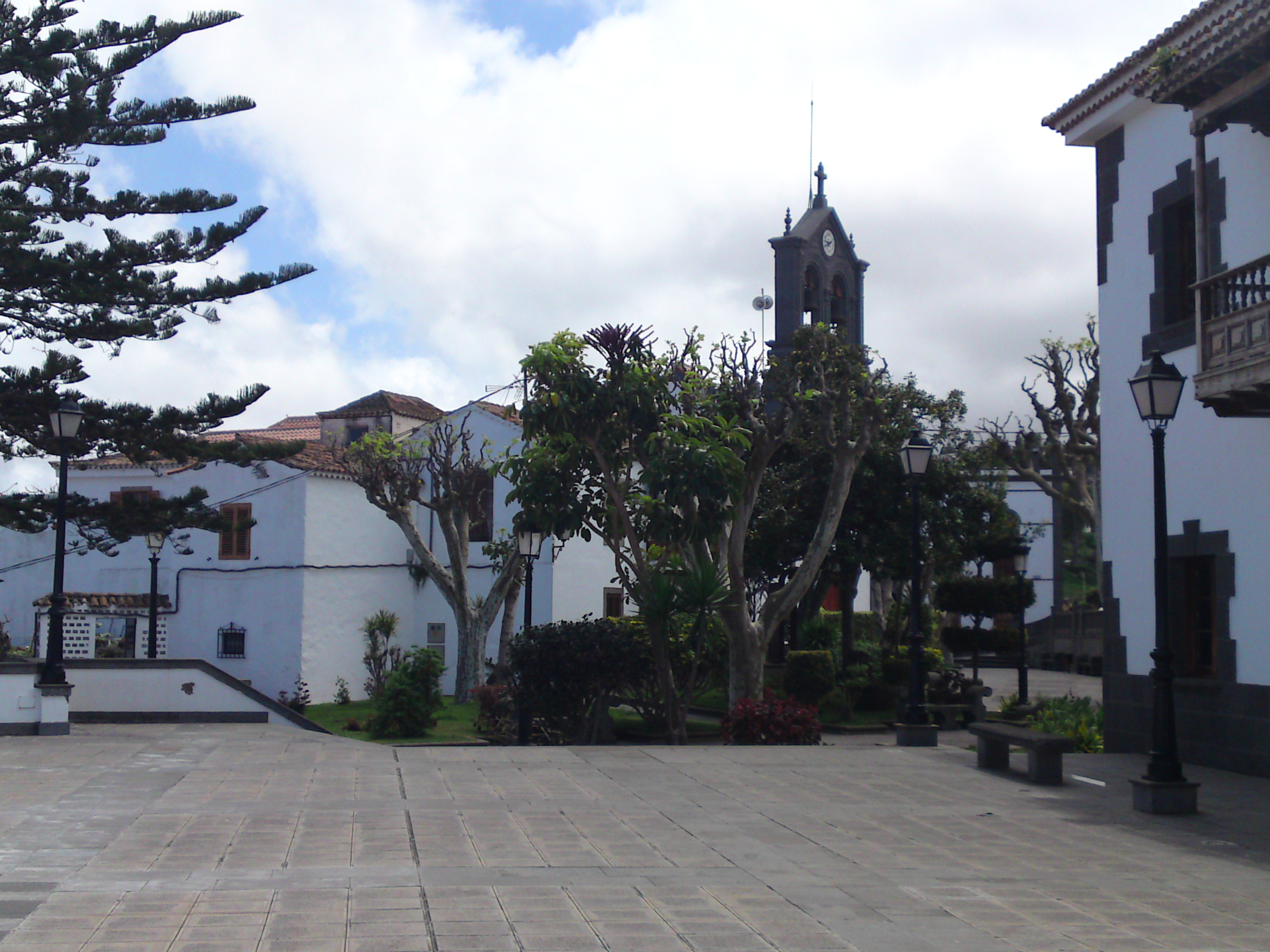
San Roque town square in Firgas.

== The town ==
The central square, which has a church and town hall, is called San Roque. Important attractions are the different squares, and the Paseo de Gran Canaria, where a 30-meter-high (98 ft) waterfall, as well as relief models of the different islands have been laid out.

== Physical geography ==
=== Location ===
Firgas is located in the north of the island of Gran Canaria, 28 kilometres from the island's capital.

It borders the municipalities of Moya, Valleseco, Teror and Arucas.

With an area of 15.77 km^{2}, Firgas is the smallest municipality on the island of Gran Canaria.

The municipal head is located at 465 m. The municipality has no exit from the sea, being its minimum altitude of 41 m located at a point in the ravine of Quintanilla, on the municipal boundary with Arucas. The highest point of Firgas is reached at 967 meters above sea level on the Pico de Osorio.

=== Climate ===
The municipality of Firgas has a dry semi-arid cold climate, according to the Köppen classification.

The average annual temperature is 17.8 °C, the hottest month being August at 21.8 °C and the coldest January at 14.4 °C.

As for rainfall, Firgas registers an average of 268 mm per year, with the rainiest months being November and December with 54 mm, and the driest months being July and August with 1 mm.

== See also ==
- List of municipalities in Las Palmas
