= Valsequillo de Gran Canaria =

- Municipality
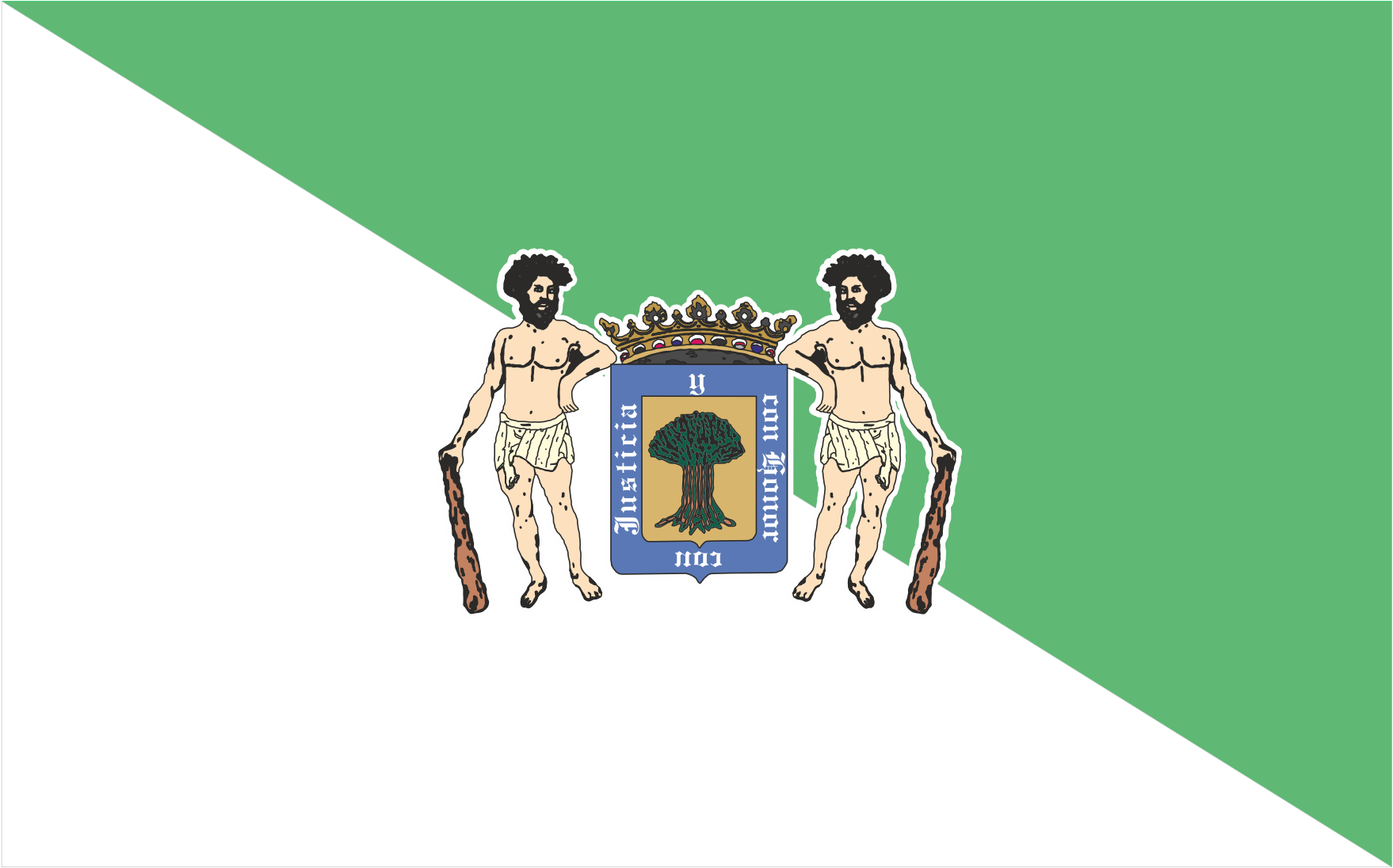
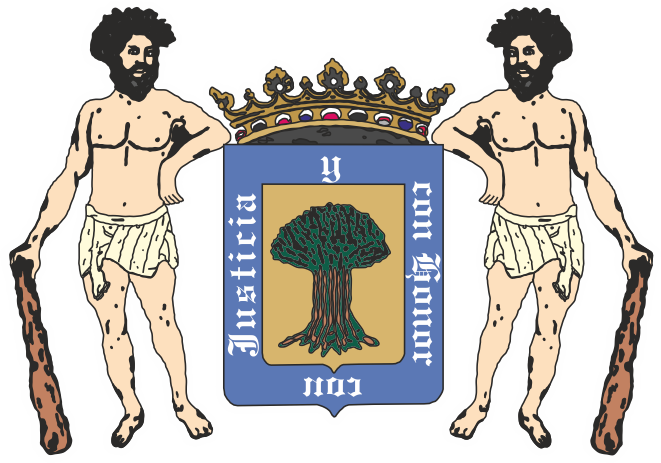
- Flag Coat of arms

- Municipal location in Gran Canaria

- Location in the province of Las Palmas Valsequillo de Gran Canaria (Canary Islands) Valsequillo de Gran Canaria (Spain, Canary Islands)
- Coordinates: 28°0′N 15°28′W
- Country: Spain
- Autonomous Region: Canary Islands
- Province: Las Palmas
- Island: Gran Canaria

Area
  - Total: 39.15 km^{2} (15.12 sq mi)
- Elevation: 560 m (1,840 ft)

Population (2025-01-01)
  - Total: 9,869
  - Density: 252.1/km^{2} (652.9/sq mi)
- Time zone: UTC+0 (GMT)

Valsequillo de Gran Canaria is a town and a municipality in the eastern part of the island of Gran Canaria in the Province of Las Palmas in the Canary Islands. Its population is 9,170 (2013), and the area is 39.15 km^{2} (15.12 sq mi).

Valsequillo is situated in the mountains, 5 km west of Telde and 16 km southwest of Las Palmas.

== Historical population ==
Historical population

| Year | Pop. | ±% |
|---|---|---|
| 1991 | 6,374 | — |
| 1996 | 7,796 | +22.3% |
| 1998 | 7,710 | −1.1% |
| 1999 | 7,905 | +2.5% |
| 2000 | 8,049 | +1.8% |
| 2001 | 8,139 | +1.1% |

| Year | Pop. | ±% |
|---|---|---|
| 2002 | 8,311 | +2.1% |
| 2003 | 8,381 | +0.8% |
| 2004 | 8,498 | +1.4% |
| 2005 | 8,659 | +1.9% |
| 2006 | 8,583 | −0.9% |
| 2013 | 9,170 | +6.8% |

== Gallery ==
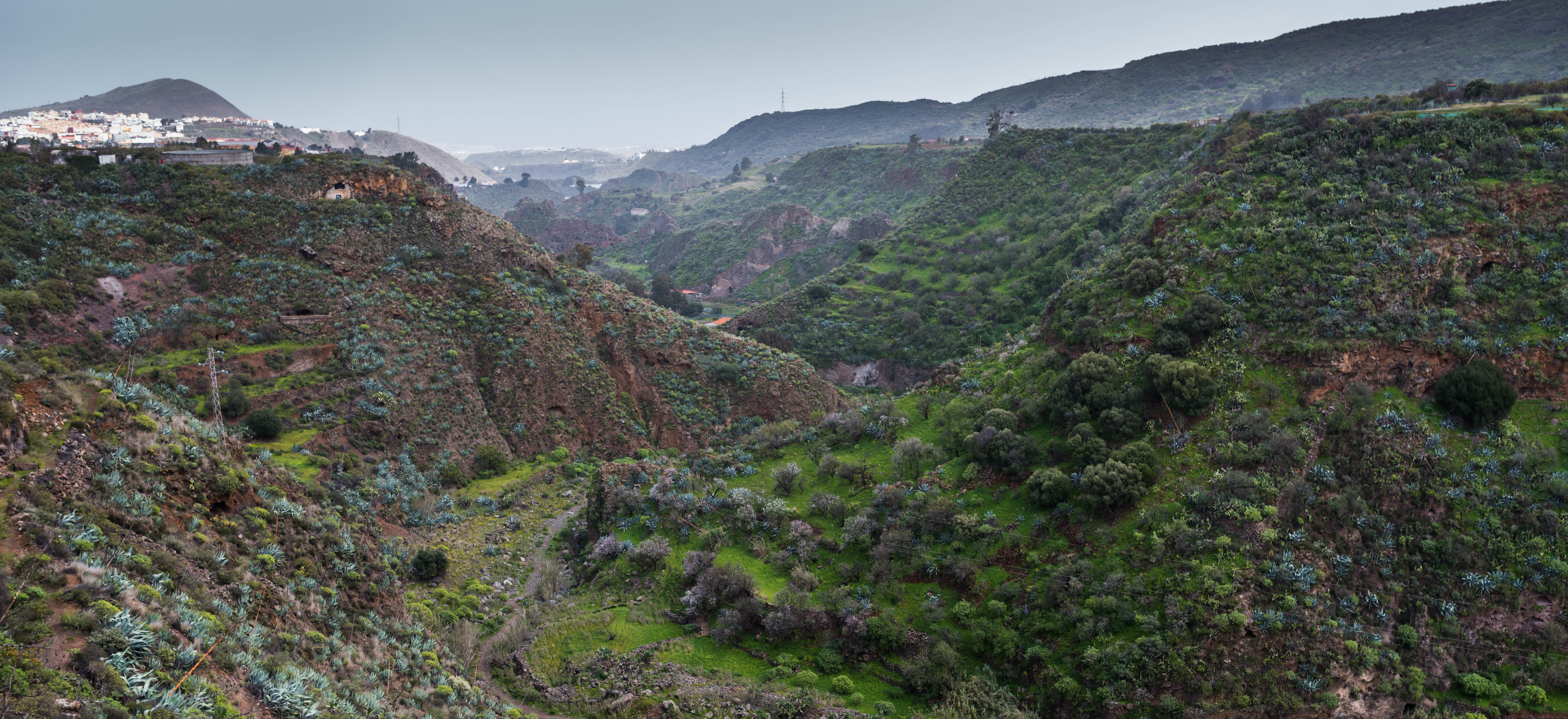
Valsequillo de Gran Canaria 2017

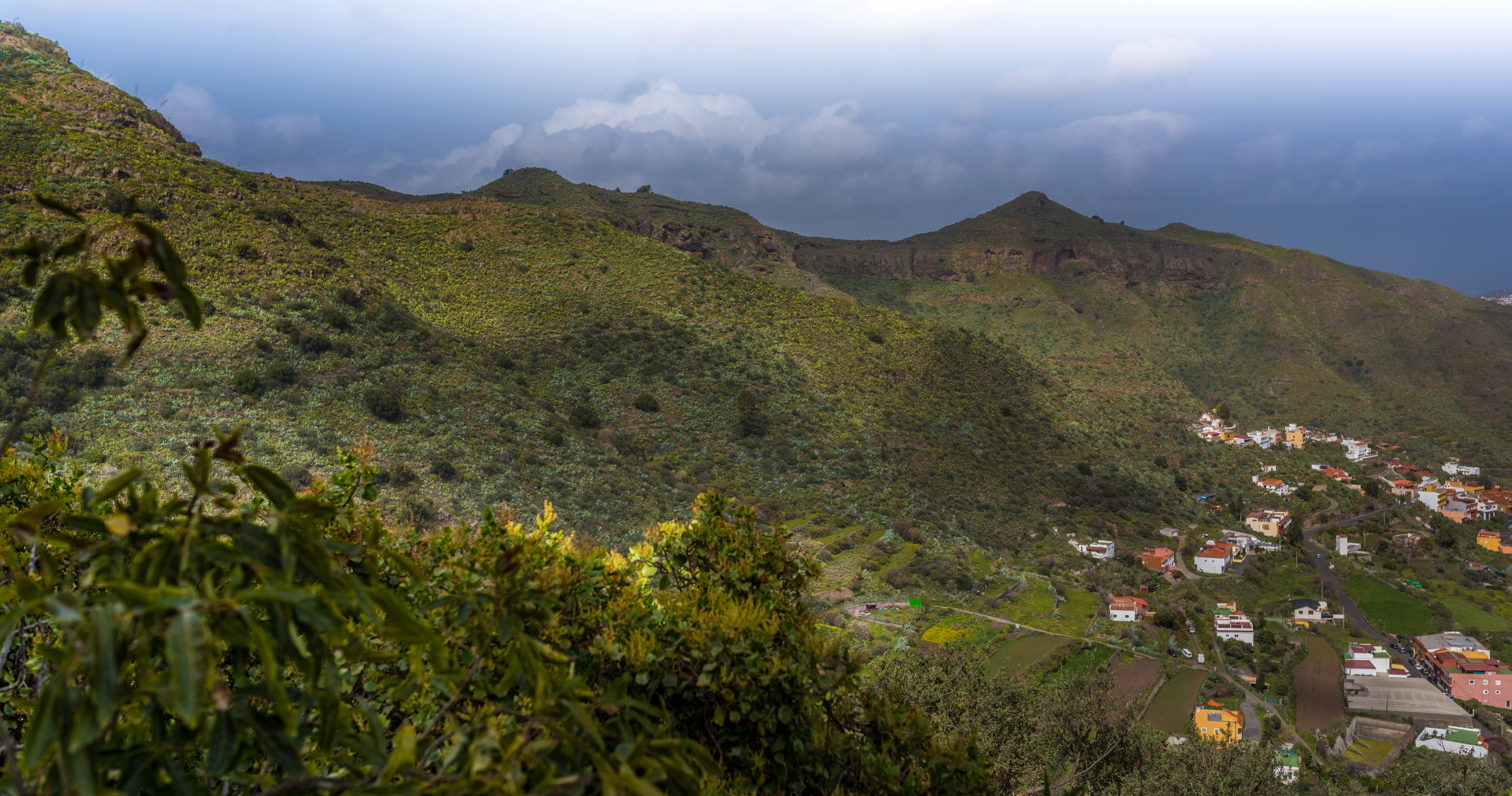
Valsequillo de Gran Canaria 2017
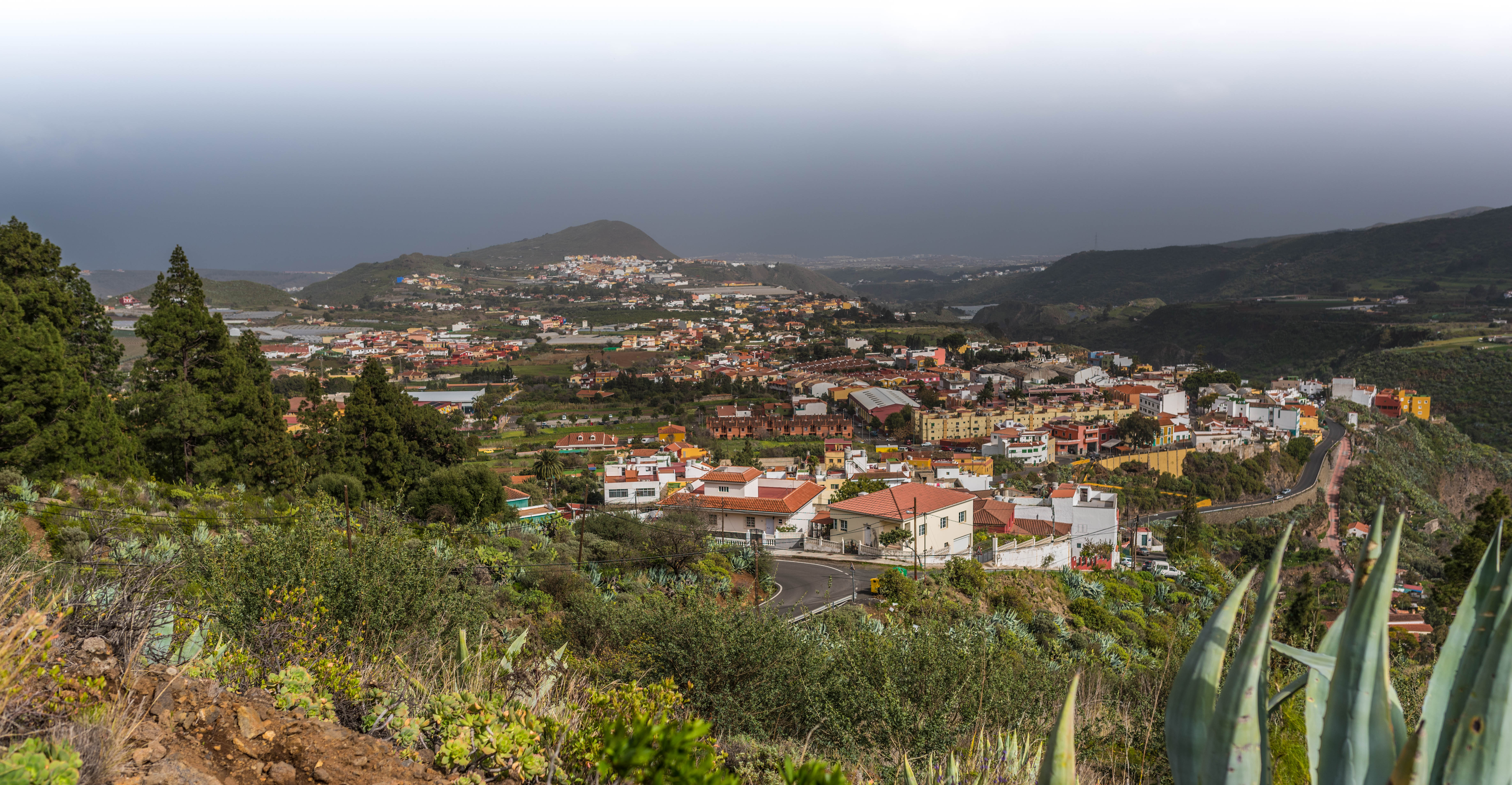
Valsequillo de Gran Canaria 2017

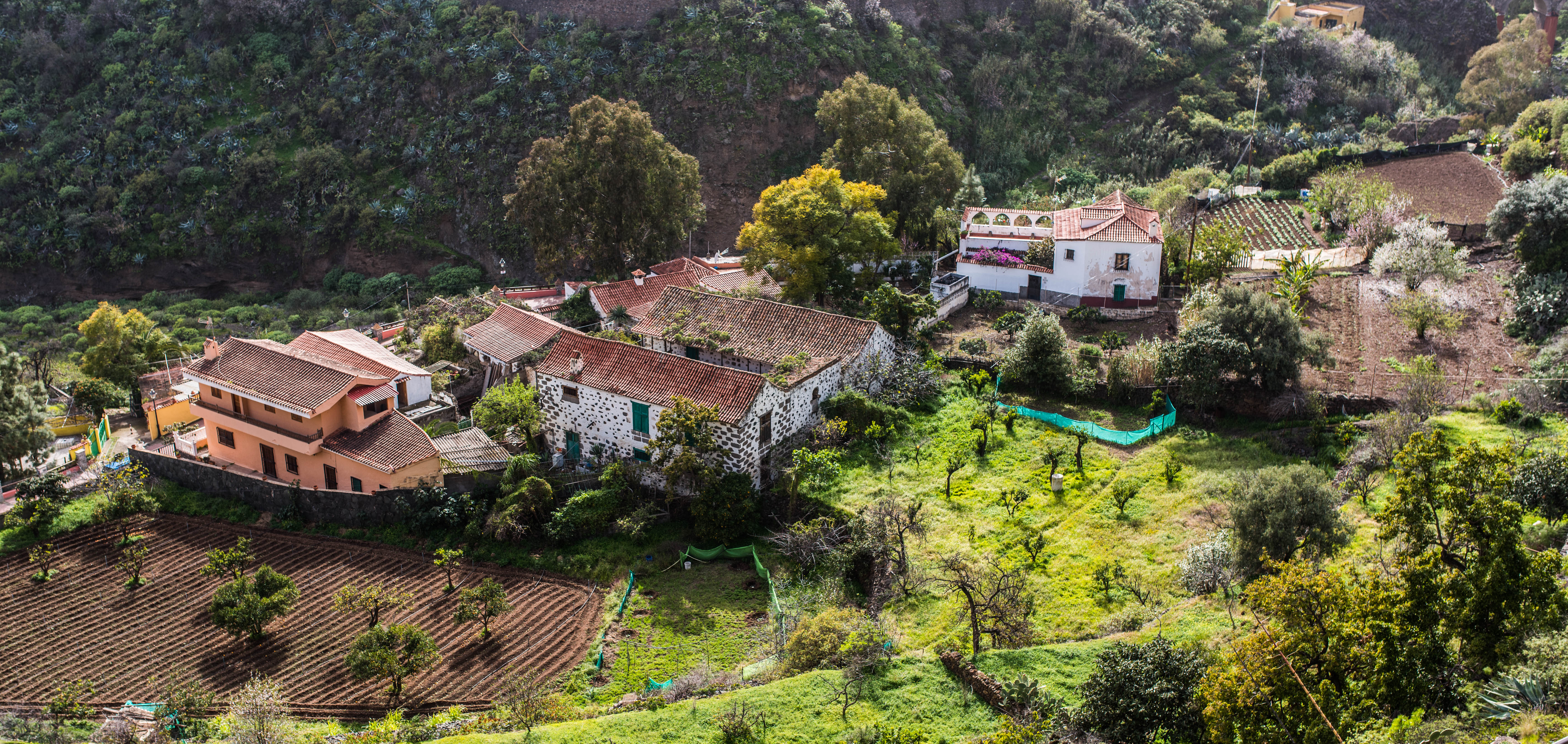
Valsequillo de Gran Canaria 2017

== See also ==
- List of municipalities in Las Palmas
