= Artenara =

- Municipality
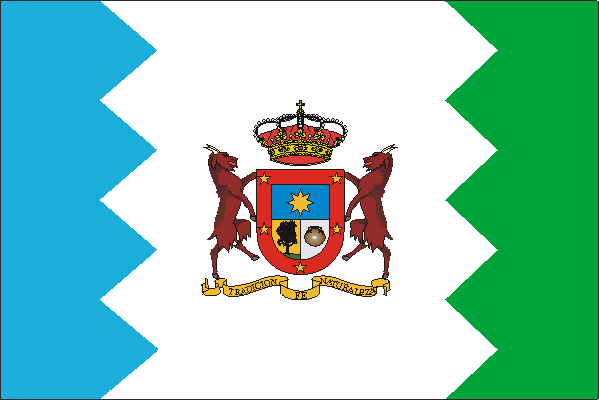
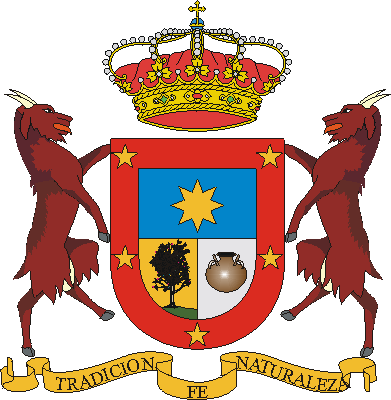
- Flag Coat of arms

- Municipal location in Gran Canaria

- Location in the province of Las Palmas Artenara (Canary Islands) Artenara (Spain, Canary Islands)
- Coordinates: 28°1′N 15°39′W
- Country: Spain
- Autonomous Region: Canary Islands
- Province: Las Palmas
- Island: Gran Canaria

Area
  - Total: 66.70 km^{2} (25.75 sq mi)
- Elevation: 1,270 m (4,170 ft)

Population (2025-01-01)
  - Total: 1,024
  - Density: 15.35/km^{2} (39.76/sq mi)
- Time zone: UTC+0 (GMT)
- Climate: Csb

Artenara is a village and a Spanish municipality in the western part of the island of Gran Canaria in the Las Palmas province in the Canary Islands.

The village of Artenara is situated in the mountains, 24 km (15 mi) south-west of Las Palmas.

Its population is 1,198 (2013), and the area is 66.70 km^{2} (25.75 sq mi). Artenara is the smallest municipality of Gran Canaria in population.

== Population ==
Year	Population
1991	1,104
1996	1,250
2001	1,319
2002	1,394
2003	1,357
2004	1,468
2013	1,198

== See also ==
- List of municipalities in Las Palmas
