= Valleseco =

- Municipality
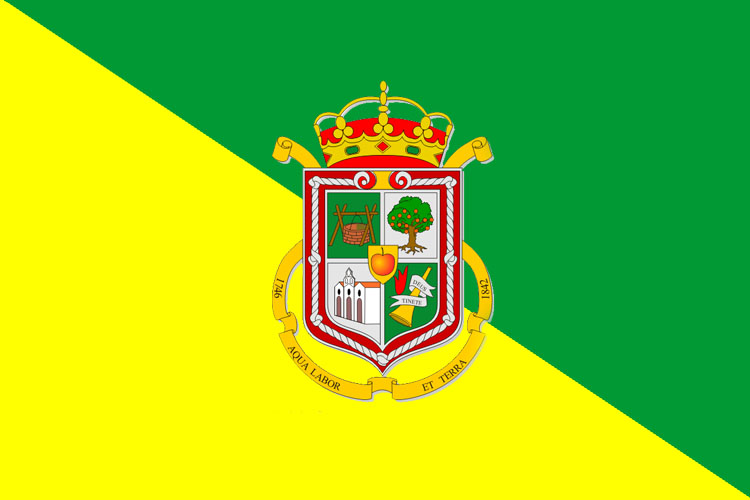
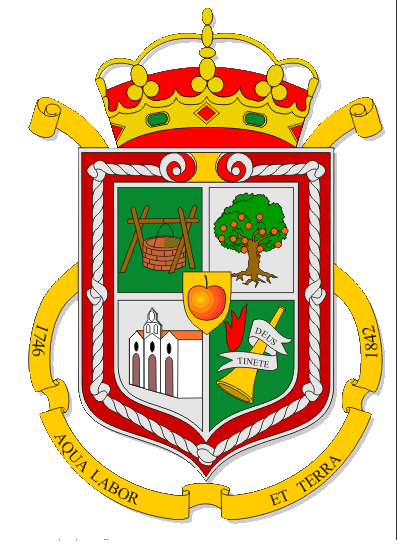
- Flag Coat of arms

- Municipal location in Gran Canaria

- Location in the province of Las Palmas Valleseco (Canary Islands) Valleseco (Spain, Canary Islands)
- Coordinates: 28°3′0″N 15°34′30″W
- Country: Spain
- Autonomous Region: Canary Islands
- Province: Las Palmas
- Island: Gran Canaria

Area
  - Total: 22.11 km^{2} (8.54 sq mi)

Population (2025-01-01)
  - Total: 3,775
  - Density: 170.7/km^{2} (442.2/sq mi)
- Time zone: UTC+0 (GMT)

Valleseco is a town and a municipality of Las Palmas province, on the Canary Islands. It is in the northcentral part of Gran Canaria. Valleseco means "dry valley" in Spanish, but is actually one of the wettest municipalities of the island. Its population is 3,904 (2013), and the area is 22.11 km^{2} (8.54 sq mi). The elevation is 1,000 m.

The town Valleseco is situated 3 km southwest of Teror and 17 km southwest of the city of Las Palmas. Its landscape is characterized by deep valleys and ravines and a great vegetal richness that has resulted in more than 80% of the territory being protected by Nature Reserves.

Valleseco, at 1000 m. above sea level, often seems to be enveloped in a "sea of clouds". This helps to make the landscape very lush. Here, the trade winds deposit its precipitations, which, according to a local saying, "seem not to wet but soak", a type of wealth in the form of rain so appreciated by the country person, who thus sees his effort rewarded with productive crops of potatoes, corn and fruits.

== Places of interest ==
=== The heart of the municipality ===
Possibly the best known building in Valleseco can be found here; the Saint Vicente Ferrer's Temple. Of simple construction, it is also the oldest building in Valleseco (1898), highlighting the pulpit and the coffering in its interior, built in mudejar style. There are also some images of great historical and artistic value that come from the old chapel that preceded this church, and a reliquary, containing part of a bone of the saint's arm, is venerated. The greatest reliquary, however, is a German organ from the 18TH century which came from the Church of the Pino in Teror and which has been recently restored/

In the Cornmeal Mill, built more than 80 years ago, two revolving stones grind the grain of maize and produce the toasted cornmeal, known as "gofio".

The Tourist Information Office is also located in the heart of the village. There is a permanent craftwork exhibition with different works, such as fabrics, musical instruments, wooden furniture, traditional Canarian costumes and openwork, made by artisans of the region.

=== The Barranco de la Virgen ===
The Barranco de la Virgen is one of the two principal ravines that cross the municipality of Valleseco. Flanked by high mountains, it is possible to listen the sound of silence.

As part of the Parque Rural de Doramas (Doramas Rural Park), the Barranco de la Virgen gives shelter to a forest of laurisilva, that used to cover the whole interior of the island in the past. One of its tributaries, the Barranco Oscuro, is especially notorious and, as it has received the category of Total Nature Reserve, it has the highest possible protection within the Canarian Nature Reserve Network. It runs between high cliffs that have preserved the endemic flora, which in many cases, can only be found in this area.

Due to its abundance of water and its fertile lands, a flourishing agriculture was soon developed in the region and several stately buildings and estates of traditional architecture were built. These can still be seen along the ravine nowadays as well as the traces of ancient mills that bear witness to the past of the region linked to water.

=== La Laguna ===
Around 2.5K away from the town center, La Laguna de Valleseco is located her with access from the crossroads between the roads to Teror GC-21 and Firgas GC-30.

The recreational area of La Laguna, situated in the Parque Rural de Doramas, was formed by a volcanic crater whose interior is covered with the distinctive vegetation of the laurisilva. The different trees that constitute this forest, the only one in the world, can be observed by walking by La Laguna. In fact, it is a small lagoon which all types of fowls approach to drink, from the little birds such as canaries and alpispas, to migratory birds such as herons.

=== The summit ===
Following the GC-21 towards the high part of the municipality, we enter the Nature Reserve of the Protected Landscape of the Peaks, which is a territory of important vegetation for the collecting of water on the island. Many species of plants of botanical interest are located in this area, highlighting the Canarian pine among others.

Above Lanzarote, Gran Canaria's washing area there is a nature reserve called Cortijo de Calderetas. Access is gained from the road walking across a short track. Its historical origins date back to the time of the conquest of the island, just as the other estates found when continuing the route: Cueva Corcho, Crespo, Almaderos, Mesas de Galaz. It has large expanses of pine forest and chestnuts that have been reforested where, previously, there was nothing more than wasteland or pastureland. In the distance, the city of Las Palmas can sometimes be seen.

The Montañón Negro (Big Black Mountain) rises in the limit of the municipality. The rugged and dry landscape reveals its recent volcanic origin. Due to its geological characteristics it has been declared a natural monument, now belonging to the Canarian Nature Reserve Network.

== Gastronomy ==
In Valleseco there is a wide variety of gastronomy, mainly based on meat: pork, goat, beef or rabbit, marinaded, stewed or with sauce. The specialities are: the "mojo the cochino" (pork with typical Canarian sauce), kid goat in sauce, marinaded pork and rabbit, beef stew, roasted pork leg. Other well-known dishes are: vegetable stew with jaramagos, picked in the country, where they grow wild; watercress stew, made with this vegetable that grows in places designed for it; coriander soup, served with kneaded toasted cornmeal and goat cheese.

== Festivals ==
The main festivals in Valleseco are to honor Saint Vicente Ferrer, in mid May or at the beginning of June, depending on Easter. Another major celebration takes place the first Sunday of October in honor of Nuestra Señora de la Encarnación. It is also the Apple Festival, in which people of the town arrive dressed with traditional costumes the day previous to the main celebration day.

== See also ==
- List of municipalities in Las Palmas
