= Ranked lists of Spanish provinces =

This is a list of the provinces of Spain by population, area, density, coastline length and GDP.

== Population and geography ==
Province	Autonomous community	Population (2025)	Area (km^{2})	Density	Coastline (km)
Madrid	Madrid	7,113,886	8,027.47	886.2	0
Barcelona	Catalonia	5,959,941	7,733.90	770.6	217
Valencia	Valencian Community	2,763,996	10,812.94	255.6	189
Alicante	Valencian Community	2,033,566	5,818.30	349.5	318
Seville	Andalusia	1,977,664	14,035.69	140.9	0
Málaga	Andalusia	1,791,183	7,307.76	245.1	215
Murcia	Murcia	1,586,989	11,316.17	140.2	339
Cádiz	Andalusia	1,261,420	7,444.00	169.5	417
Balearic Islands (Note: Insular province)	Balearic Islands	1,249,844	4,991.70	250.4	1,455
Las Palmas	Canary Islands	1,171,547	4,069.70	287.9	900
Biscay	Basque Country	1,167,233	2,215.55	526.8	155
A Coruña	Galicia	1,135,623	7,953.90	142.8	1,226
Santa Cruz de Tenerife	Canary Islands	1,087,319	3,375.88	322.1	910
Asturias	Asturias	1,015,128	10,605.70	95.7	548
Zaragoza	Aragon	998,443	17,275.06	57.8	0
Pontevedra	Galicia	947,818	4,496.95	210.8	618
Granada	Andalusia	945,797	12,645.38	74.8	86
Tarragona	Catalonia	875,530	6,307.18	138.8	333
Girona	Catalonia	830,429	5,908.09	140.6	394
Córdoba	Andalusia	773,163	13,772.22	56.1	0
Almería	Andalusia	770,554	8,773.06	87.8	282
Toledo	Castilla-La Mancha	755,081	15,369.34	49.1	0
Gipuzkoa	Basque Country	733,149	1,981.14	370.1	100
Navarre	Navarra	683,854	10,392.16	65.8	0
Badajoz	Extremadura	665,155	21,769.11	30.6	0
Castellón	Valencian Community	627,620	6,633.98	94.6	177
Jaén	Andalusia	618,143	13,493.33	45.8	0
Cantabria	Cantabria	593,623	5,330.20	111.4	323
Huelva	Andalusia	538,789	10,127.43	53.2	152
Valladolid	Castile and León	528,644	8,110.51	65.2	0
Ciudad Real	Castilla-La Mancha	494,848	19,812.04	25.0	0
Lleida	Catalonia	458,226	12,163.49	37.7	0
León	Castile and León	448,030	15,578.32	28.8	0
Albacete	Castilla-La Mancha	390,751	14,931.74	26.2	0
Cáceres	Extremadura	388,190	19,864.50	19.5	0
Burgos	Castile and León	362,663	14,288.63	25.4	0
Álava	Basque Country	341,961	3,037.57	112.6	0
Salamanca	Castile and León	328,446	12,348.35	26.6	0
La Rioja	La Rioja	326,803	5,045.09	64.8	0
Lugo	Galicia	326,022	9,858.39	33.1	177
Ourense	Galicia	305,278	7,274.68	42.0	0
Guadalajara	Castile-La Mancha	285,839	12,213.17	23.4	0
Huesca	Aragon	230,087	15,637.60	14.7	0
Cuenca	Castilla-La Mancha	199,859	17,121.15	11.7	0
Zamora	Castile and León	165,564	10,561.21	15.7	0
Ávila	Castile and León	160,738	8,049.04	20.0	0
Palencia	Castile and León	158,702	8,051.95	19.7	0
Segovia	Castile and León	158,251	6,922.58	22.9	0
Teruel	Aragon	136,091	14,826.98	9.2	0
Soria	Castile and León	90,183	10,306.98	8.7	0
Melilla	Melilla	87,067	14.24	6,114.3	16
Ceuta	Ceuta	83,567	19.87	4,205.7	34

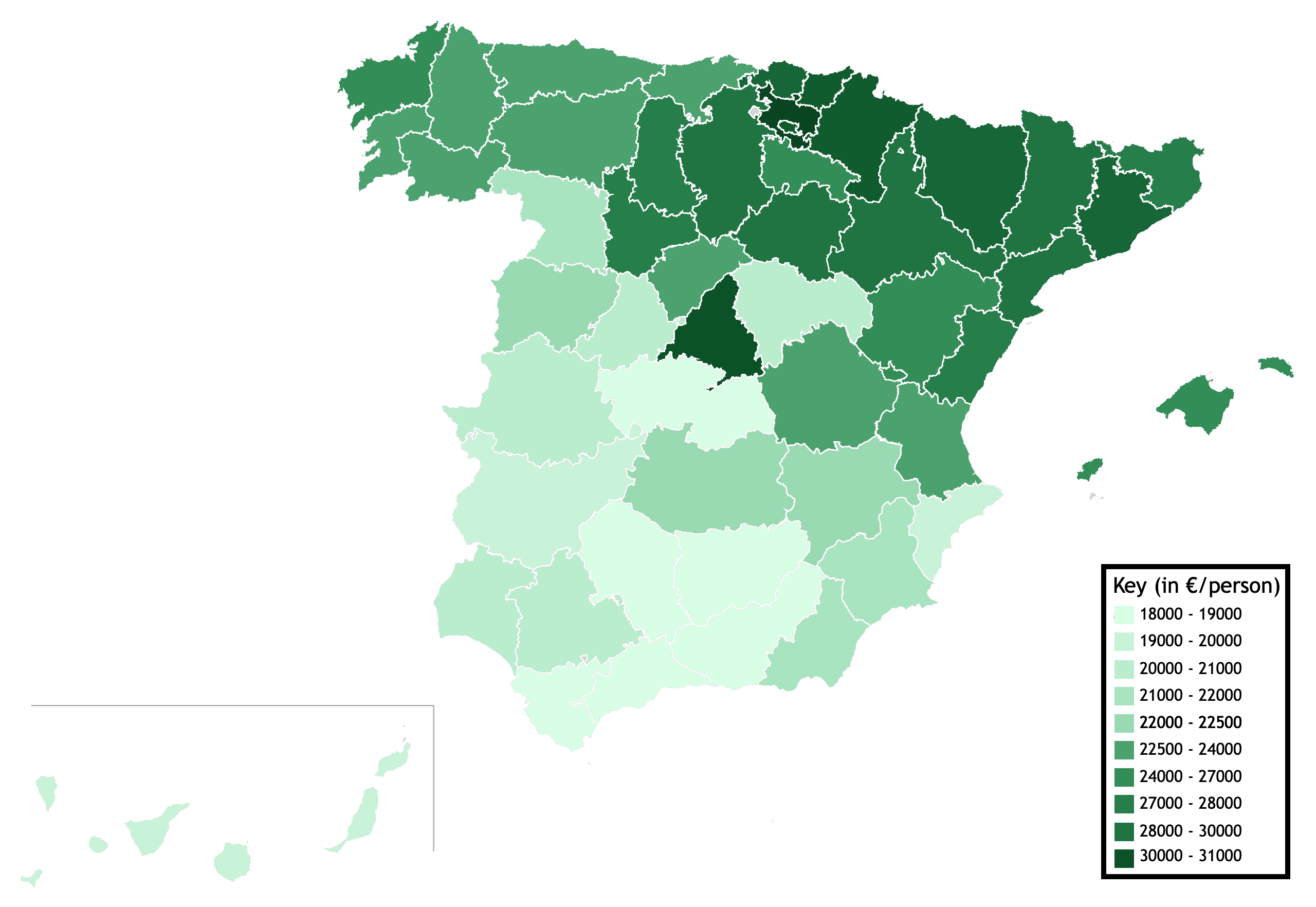
Spanish provinces by GDP per capita, 2021 (€)

== Economy ==
All provinces and islands of Spain by GDP and GDP per capita in 2015.

Province	2015 GDP (in mil. of Euro)	2015 GDP (mil. of US$ PPP)	2015 GDP per capita (in Euro)	2015 GDP per capita (in US$ PPP)
A Coruña	24,437	36,590	21,695	32,484
Lugo	7,069	10,585	20,943	31,359
Ourense	6,176	9,248	19,501	29,200
Pontevedra	18,644	27,916	19,693	29,487
Asturias	21,219	31,772	20,297	30,392
Cantabria	12,196	18,262	20,886	31,273
Álava	11,482	17,192	35,744	53,521
Gipuzkoa	21,788	32,624	30,791	46,105
Biscay	33,212	49,730	29,242	43,786
Navarre	18,564	27,797	29,146	43,641
La Rioja	7,856	11,763	25,084	37,559
Huesca	5,615	8,408	25,368	37,985
Teruel	3,324	4,977	24,284	36,361
Zaragoza	24,504	36,691	25,412	38,050
Madrid	203,602	304,861	31,789	47,599
Ávila	2,999	4,491	18,209	27,265
Burgos	9,335	13,978	25,831	38,677
León	9,386	14,054	19,652	29,426
Palencia	3,972	5,947	24,068	36,038
Salamanca	6,614	9,903	19,437	29,104
Segovia	3,306	4,950	21,037	31,500
Soria	2,192	3,282	24,019	35,965
Valladolid	12,450	18,642	23,664	35,433
Zamora	3,396	5,085	18,584	27,826
Albacete	7,227	10,821	18,345	27,469
Ciudad Real	9,704	14,530	18,980	28,419
Cuenca	4,065	6,087	19,800	29,648
Guadalajara	4,587	6,868	18,029	26,996
Toledo	11,852	17,747	17,154	25,686
Badajoz	10,815	16,194	15,804	23,664
Cáceres	6,653	9,962	16,469	24,660
Barcelona	151,145	226,315	27,787	41,607
Girona	19,941	29,858	26,911	40,295
Lleida	12,184	18,244	28,343	42,439
Tarragona	22,265	33,338	28,098	42,072
Alicante	33,472	50,119	18,168	27,204
Castellón	13,202	19,768	23,047	34,509
Valencia	54,101	81,008	21,461	32,135
Ibiza and Formentera	3,470	5,196	22,029	32,985
Mallorca	22,116	33,115	25,145	37,650
Menorca	1,752	2,623	18,802	28,153
Almería	12,808	19,178	18,464	27,647
Cádiz	19,917	29,823	15,954	23,888
Córdoba	13,306	19,924	16,757	25,091
Granada	15,574	23,320	16,959	25,394
Huelva	9,027	13,517	17,297	25,899
Jaén	10,851	16,248	16,711	25,023
Málaga	27,727	41,517	16,948	25,378
Seville	35,841	53,666	18,474	27,662
Murcia Province	28,212	42,243	19,256	28,832
Ceuta Province	1,595	2,388	18,838	28,207
Melilla Province	1,456	2,180	17,196	25,748
El Hierro	178	267	16,682	24,979
Fuerteventura	2,298	3,441	20,695	30,988
Gran Canaria	15,812	23,676	18,491	27,688
La Gomera	394	590	18,515	27,723
La Palma	1,423	2,131	17,112	25,622
Lanzarote	3,203	4,796	22,490	33,675
Tenerife	17,615	26,376	19,421	29,080

== See also ==
- Ranked lists of Spanish autonomous communities
- List of municipalities of Spain
