= Tuineje =

- Municipality
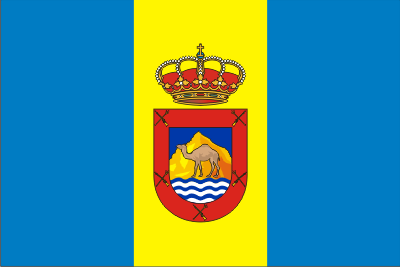
- Flag Coat of arms

- Municipal location in Fuerteventura

- Location in the province of Las Palmas Tuineje (Canary Islands) Tuineje (Spain, Canary Islands)
- Coordinates: 28°19′30″N 14°2′55″W
- Country: Spain
- Autonomous Community: Canary Islands
- Province: Las Palmas
- Island: Fuerteventura

Government
  - Mayor: Salvador Delgado (CC)

Area
  - Total: 275.94 km^{2} (106.54 sq mi)
- Elevation (AMSL): 205 m (673 ft)

Population (2025-01-01)
  - Total: 16,834
  - Density: 61.006/km^{2} (158.00/sq mi)
- Time zone: UTC+0 (CET)
  - Summer (DST): UTC+1 (CEST (GMT +1))
- Postal code: 35629
- Area code: +34 (Spain) + 928 (Las Palmas)
- Website: www.tuineje.es

Tuineje is a town and a municipality in the southern part of the island of Fuerteventura in the Province of Las Palmas, Canary Islands, Spain. The population is 13,946 (2013), and the area is 275.94 km^{2}. The largest town in the municipality is Gran Tarajal, on the south coast.

== History ==
Tuineje was the site of the two battles between the locals and English privateers in 1740.

== Notable people ==
- Aridane Hernández (born 1989), professional footballer

== Gallery ==
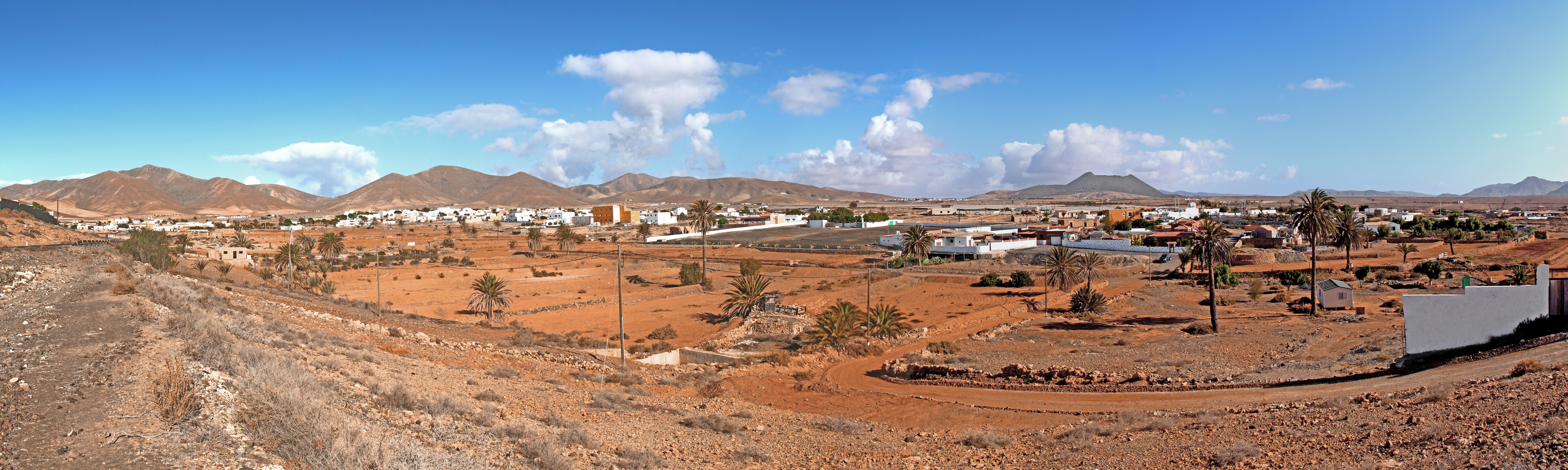
Tuineje village

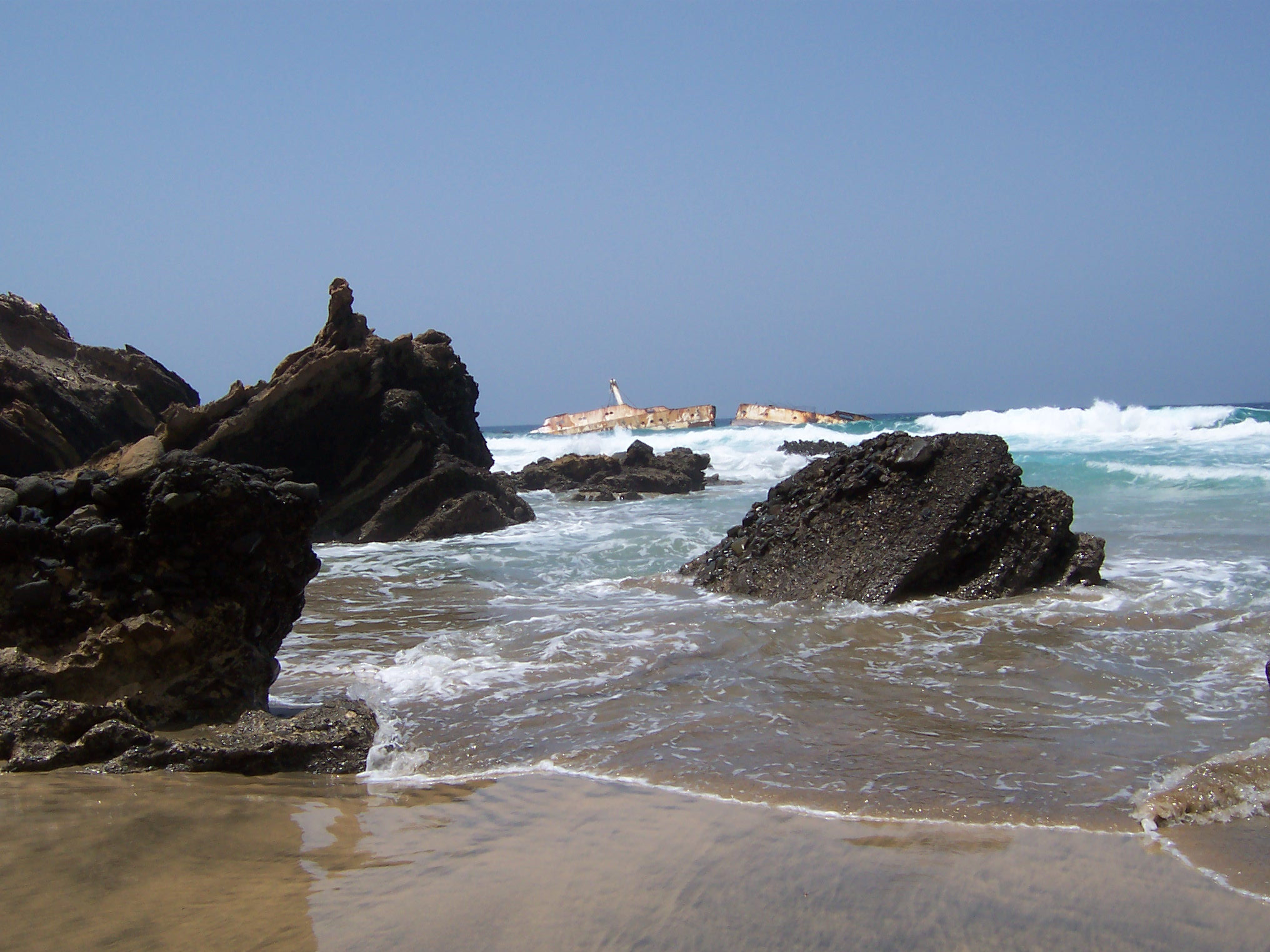
Tuineje

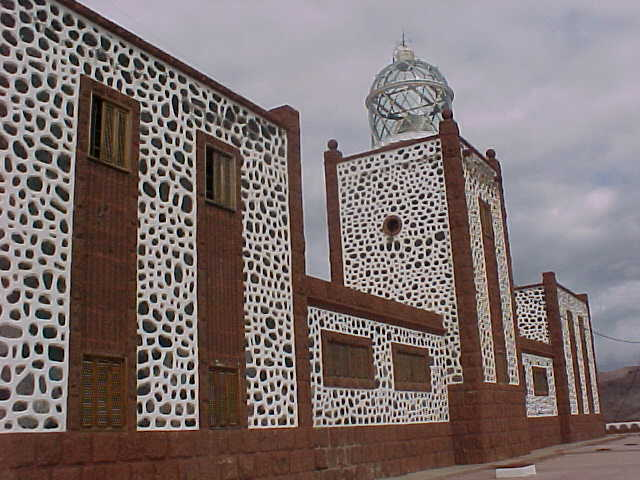
Lighthouse of La Entallada, Tuineje

== See also ==
- List of municipalities in Las Palmas
