= San Bartolomé, Las Palmas =

San Bartolomé
- Municipality
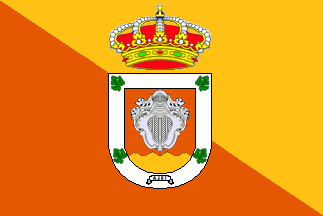
- Flag Coat of arms
- Etymology: Saint Bartholomew
- Municipal location in Lanzarote

- Location in the province of Las Palmas San Bartolomé (Canary Islands) San Bartolomé (Spain, Canary Islands)
- Coordinates: 29°0′6″N 13°36′42″W
- Country: Spain
- Autonomous Community: Canary Islands
- Province: Las Palmas
- Island: Lanzarote

Government
  - Mayor: Alexis Tejera Lemes (PSOE)

Area
  - Total: 40.89 km^{2} (15.79 sq mi)
- Elevation (AMSL): 240 m (790 ft)

Population (2019)
  - Total: 18,816
  - Density: 460.2/km^{2} (1,192/sq mi)
- Time zone: UTC±0 (WET)
  - Summer (DST): UTC+1 (WEST)
- Postal code: 35550
- Area code: +34 (Spain) + 928 (Las Palmas)
- Website: www.sanbartolome.es

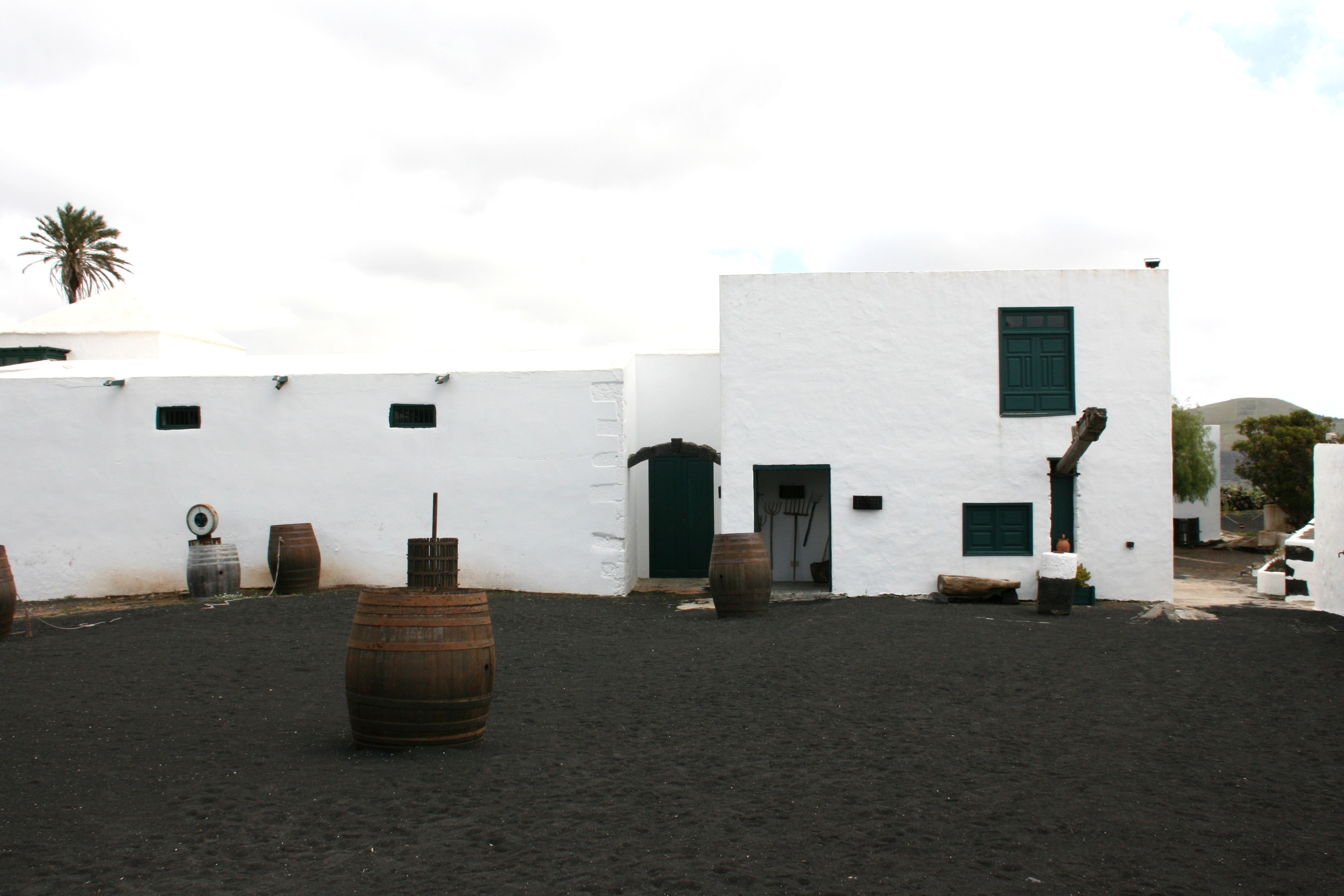
El Grifo wine cellar in San Bartolomé, Lanzarote.

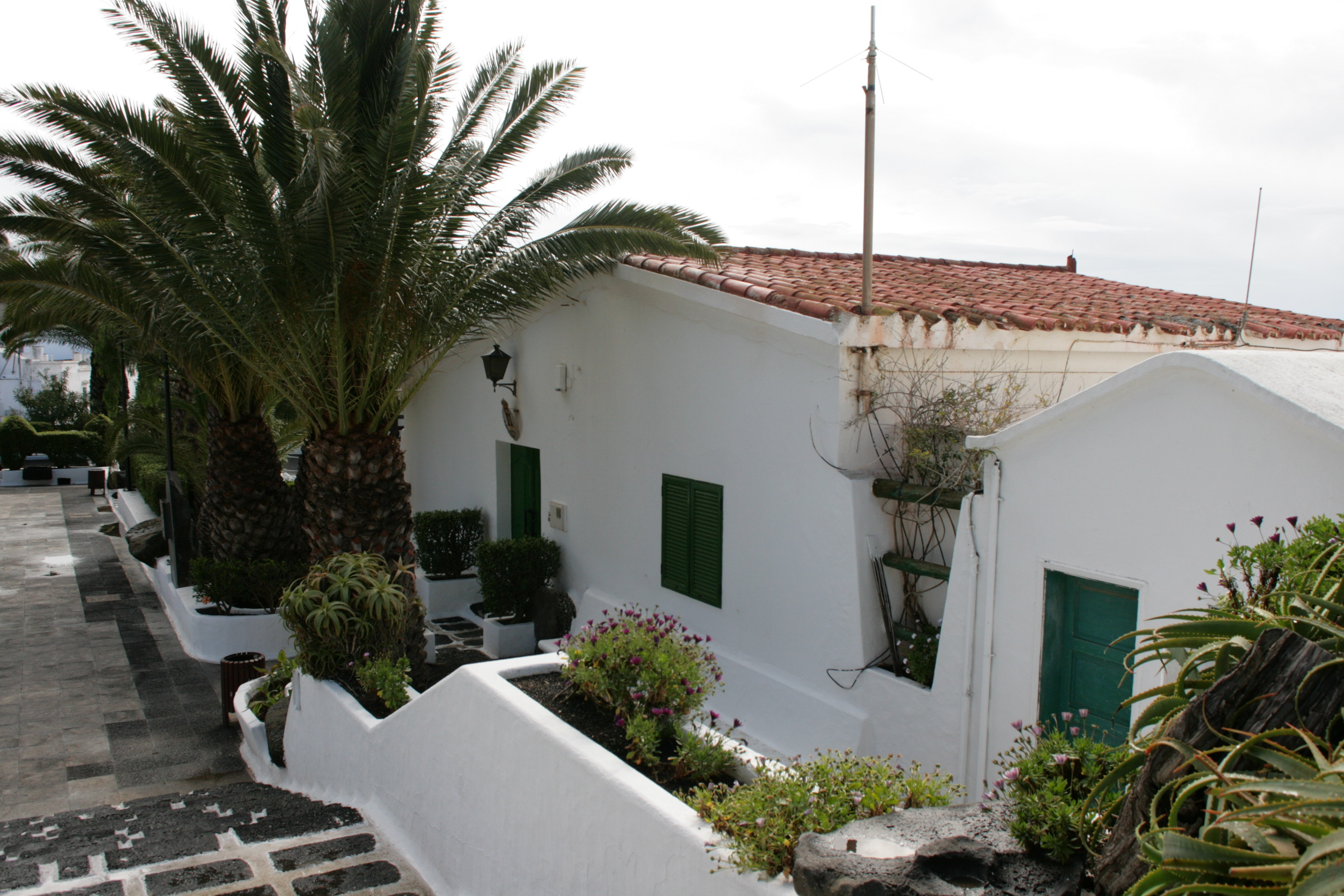
San Bartolomé typical architecture

San Bartolomé (Spanish meaning Saint Bartholomew) is a town and municipality in the Canary Islands (Spain) situated in the centre of the island of Lanzarote. The municipality of San Bartolomé stretches to the southeastern coast of the island.

It has an area of 40.89 square kilometres (15.79 sq mi) and, as of 2019, a population of 18,816, resulting in a population density of 460/km^{2}. Its altitude is 240 metres above sea level.

The town is located northwest of Arrecife, the island's capital, to which it is connected by the LZ-20 road. The municipality lies southwest of Teguise, southeast of Tinajo, which includes the Timanfaya National Park, and northeast of Tías. The municipality also includes the coastal town of Playa Honda to its southeast, located between Arrecife and Lanzarote Airport.

Most of the inhabitants work as craftsmen, farmers or in the service for tourism which is the biggest economic factor on Lanzarote.

== See also ==
- List of municipalities in Las Palmas
