= Antigua, Fuerteventura =

Antigua
- Municipality
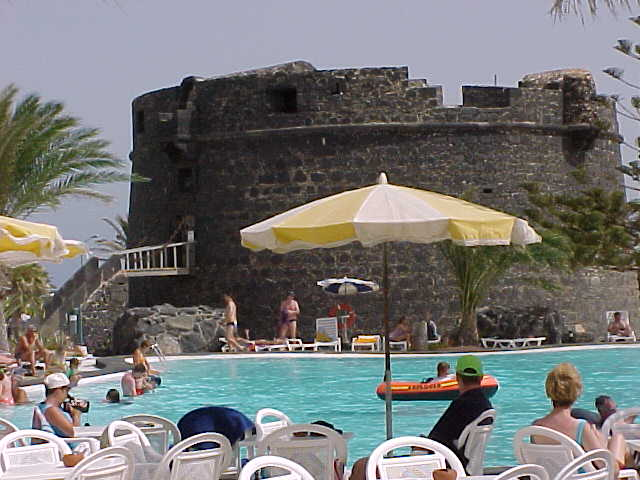
- Caleta de Fuste and its castle

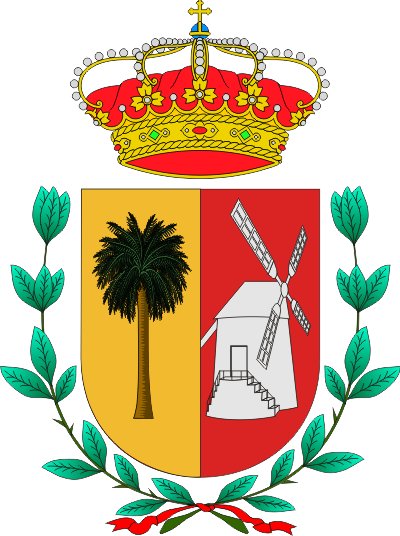
- Flag Coat of arms

- Municipal location in Fuerteventura

- Location in the province of Las Palmas Antigua (Canary Islands) Antigua (Spain, Canary Islands)
- Coordinates: 28°25′7″N 14°0′40″W
- Country: Spain
- Autonomous Community: Canary Islands
- Province: Las Palmas
- Island: Fuerteventura

Government
  - Mayor: Gustavo Berriel Hernandez (PP)

Area
  - Total: 250.56 km^{2} (96.74 sq mi)
- Elevation (AMSL): 254 m (833 ft)

Population (2025-01-01)
  - Total: 14,164
  - Density: 56.529/km^{2} (146.41/sq mi)
- Time zone: UTC+0 (CET)
  - Summer (DST): UTC+1 (CEST (GMT +1))
- Postal code: 35630
- Area code: +34 (Spain) + 928 (Las Palmas)
- Website: www.ayto-antigua.es

Antigua is a town and a municipality in the central part of the island of Fuerteventura in the Province of Las Palmas in the Canary Islands. It has a population of 11,629 (2013), and an area of 250.56 km^{2}. It is situated 17 km southwest of the capital of the island Puerto del Rosario.

== Main sights ==
- Caleta de Fuste Castle, a heritage site
- Centro Turístico Cultural Molino de Antigua (Molino de Antigua Cultural Touristic Centre): where works of major artists are exposed.
- Salinas de El Carmen, the origin of these salt mines dates back to 1800
- Paisaje Protegido del Malpaís Grande (Malpaís Grande Protected Landscape)
- Atalayita aboriginal town
- Cuchillos de Vigán, a natural Monument
- Caldera de Gairía, a national monument

== See also ==
- List of municipalities in Las Palmas
