= Province of Las Palmas =

Province of Spain

Province of Las Palmas Provincia de Las Palmas (Spanish)
- Province
- Flag Coat of arms

- Location of the Province of Las Palmas in Spain

- The Province of Las Palmas within the Canary Islands
- Coordinates: 28°20′N 14°20′W
- Country: Spain
- Autonomous community: Canary Islands
- Capital: Las Palmas de Gran Canaria
- Municipalities: 34

Area
  - Total: 4,069.70 km^{2} (1,571.32 sq mi)
  - Rank: 46th in Spain

Population (2025)
  - Total: 1,171,547
  - Rank: 10th in Spain
  - Density: 287.871/km^{2} (745.581/sq mi)
- Time zone: UTC+1 (CET)
  - Summer (DST): UTC+2 (CEST)
- Official language(s): Spanish
- Parliament: Cortes Generales

The Province of Las Palmas (/lɑːs ˈpɑːlməs/, UK: /ˈpɑːməs/; Spanish: Provincia de Las Palmas) is a province of Spain, consisting of the eastern part of the autonomous community of the Canary Islands. Las Palmas de Gran Canaria, the capital city of this province and of the island of Gran Canaria, is also the largest city in the Canary Islands.

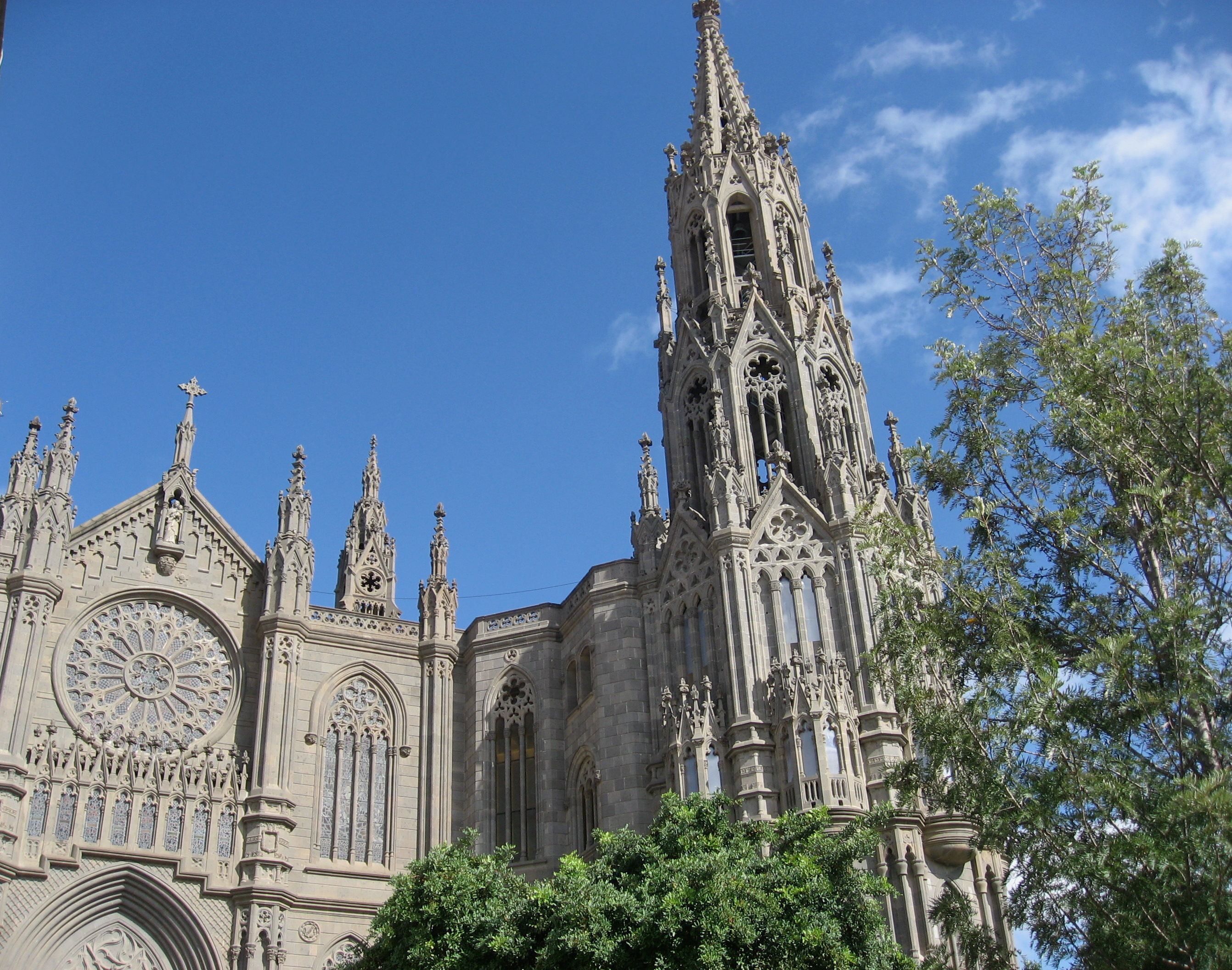
Church of San Juan Bautista

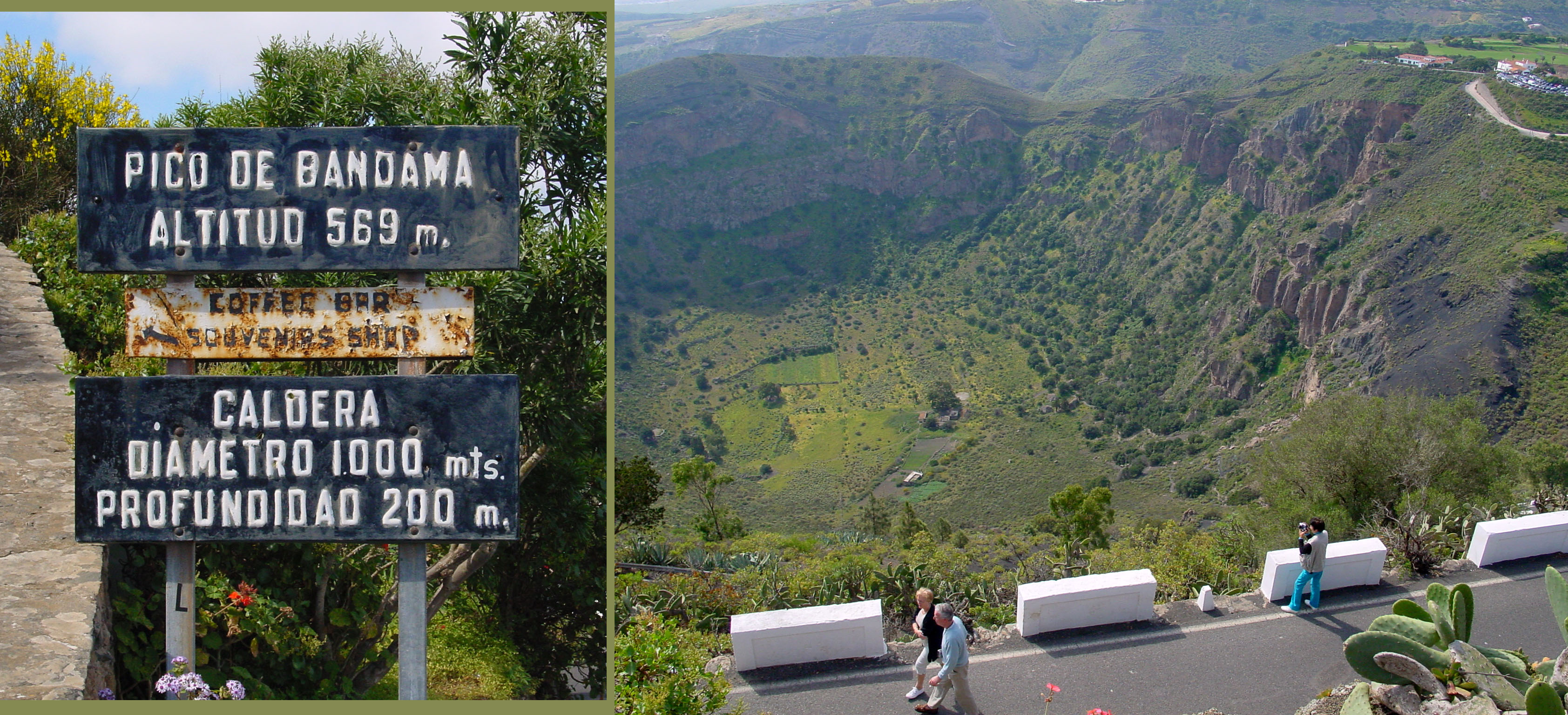
Bandama Caldera

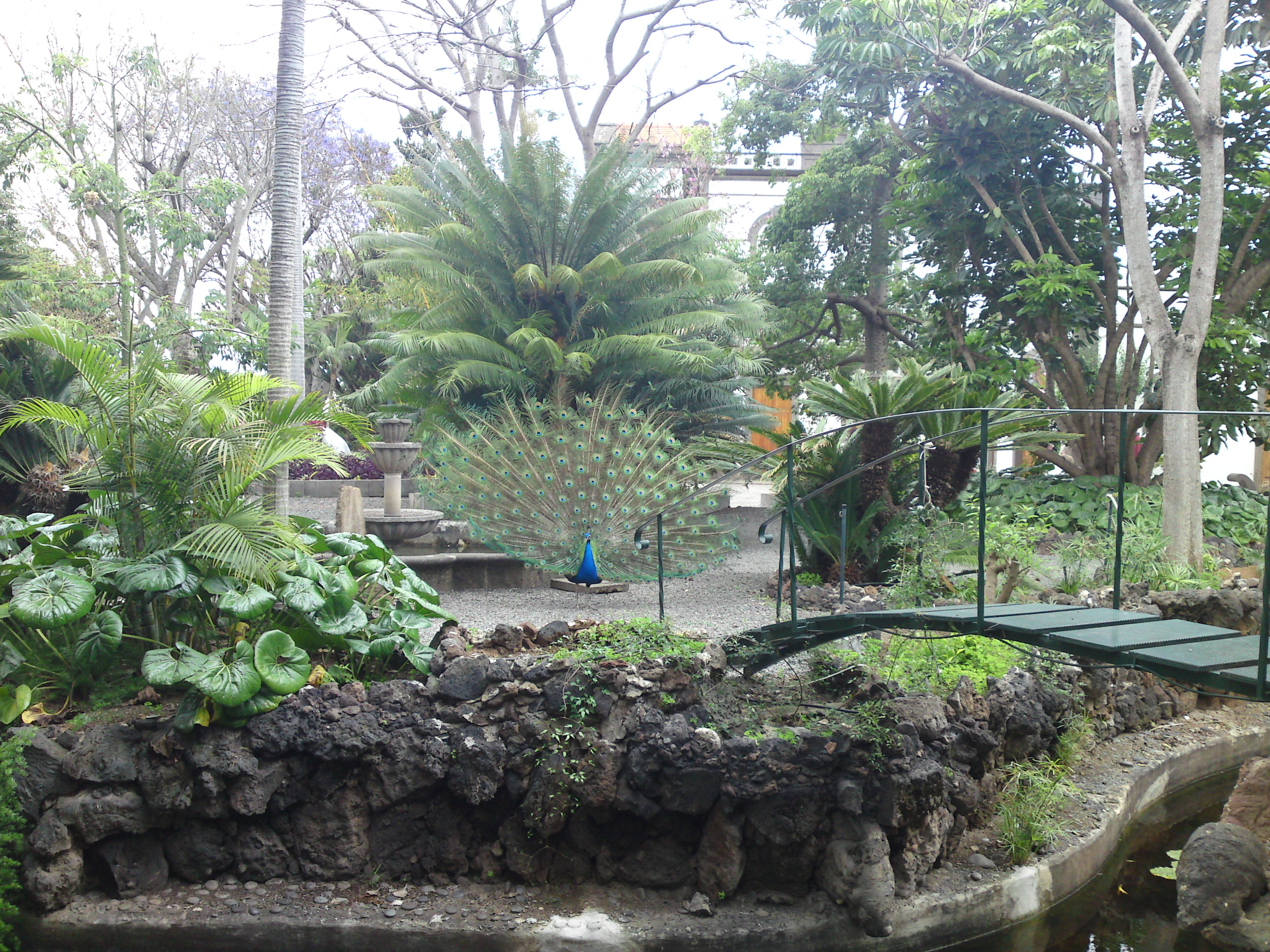
Botanic garden in Arucas

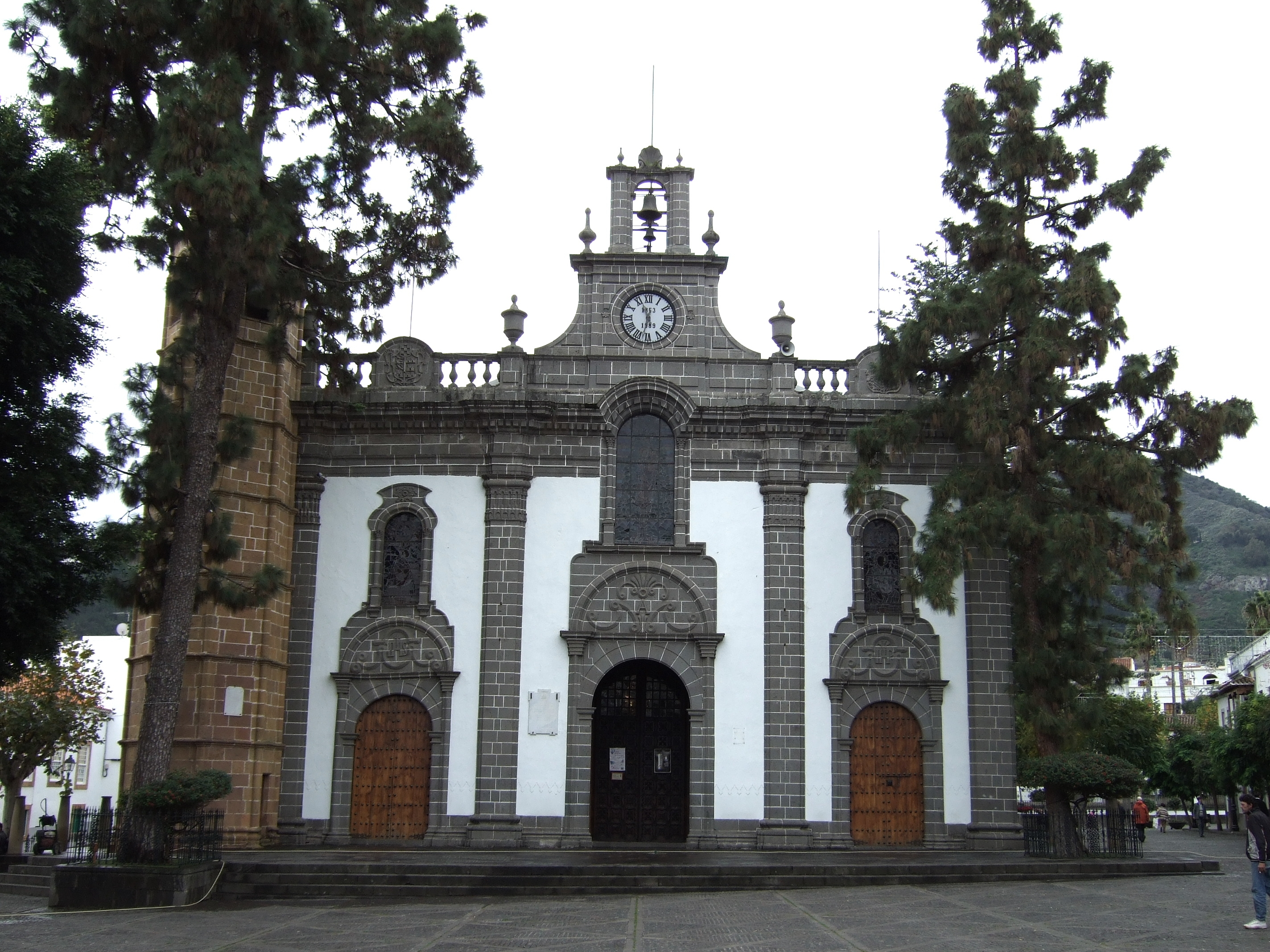
Basílica de Nuestra Señora del Pino, in Teror.

In 1927, the Province of Canary Islands was split into two provinces: Las Palmas and Santa Cruz de Tenerife. In 1982, both provinces became part of the newly founded autonomous community of the Canary Islands.

It has a population of 1,171,547 in an area of 4,069.70 square kilometres (1,571.32 sq mi) across its 34 municipalities. About 32.8% of the population lives in the capital. The name "Las Palmas" is generally used to refer to both the city and the province.

License plates in the province used to start with "GC", which referred to the island of Gran Canaria, although the same plates were also issued in Lanzarote and Fuerteventura.

== Geography ==
It consists of about half of the Atlantic archipelago, including the islands of Gran Canaria, Fuerteventura, and Lanzarote, as well as another six minor isles (Alegranza, Graciosa, Montaña Clara, Lobos, Roque del Este, and Roque del Oeste). Their total land area is 4,066 km^{2} (1,570 sq mi), representing 54.6% of the Canary Islands' total land. (The other half of the archipelago is the Province of Santa Cruz.)

Las Palmas contains the Parque Nacional Timanfaya on the island of Lanzarote.

== Municipalities ==
The province has 34 municipalities, the lowest number among the provinces of Spain:

- Agaete
- Agüimes
- Antigua
- Arrecife
- Artenara
- Arucas
- Betancuria
- Firgas
- Gáldar
- Haría
- Ingenio
- La Aldea de San Nicolás
- La Oliva
- Las Palmas de Gran Canaria
- Mogán
- Moya
- Pájara
- Puerto del Rosario
- San Bartolomé de Tirajana
- San Bartolomé
- Santa Brígida
- Santa Lucía de Tirajana
- Santa María de Guía de Gran Canaria
- Teguise
- Tejeda
- Telde
- Teror
- Tías
- Tinajo
- Tuineje
- Valleseco
- Valsequillo de Gran Canaria
- Vega de San Mateo
- Yaiza

== Demographics ==
As of 2025, the population is 1,171,547, of which 49.7% are males, and 50.3% are females. Minors make up 14.4% of the population, and seniors make up 17.4%.

Historical population

Year	Pop.	±%
1842	108,207	—
1857	95,004	−12.2%
1877	120,219	+26.5%
1887	124,774	+3.8%
1900	158,052	+26.7%
1910	198,012	+25.3%
1920	215,083	+8.6%
1930	254,707	+18.4%
1940	322,332	+26.6%

Year	Pop.	±%
1950	379,977	+17.9%
1960	459,433	+20.9%
1970	548,984	+19.5%
1981	708,762	+29.1%
1991	767,969	+8.4%
2001	887,676	+15.6%
2011	1,087,225	+22.5%
2021	1,131,359	+4.1%

Source: INE

=== Immigration ===
As of 2025, immigrants make up 21.6% of the population. The 5 largest foreign countries of birth are Colombia, Cuba, Morocco, Italy, and Venezuela.

== Transport ==
=== Air ===
The province is served by these airports:

- Gran Canaria Airport
- Fuerteventura Airport
- Lanzarote Airport
