= List of canonically crowned Marian images in Spain =

Below is a list of the Marian images venerated in the Catholic Church in Spain, that were granted a canonical coronation by the Holy See. As of September 2026, there have been 243 Marian images crowned since the first in 1881. (Note: Counting also the venerated images of Saint Joseph in Barcelona (crowned in 1921) and Ávila (crowned in 1963) brings the total count of canonically crowned images in Spain to 245.)

== 19th century ==
Official title of the image	Date of coronation	Place of devotion	Authorization by	Marian image	Shrine of devotion
Virgen de Veruela	31 July 1881	Royal Monastery of Santa María de Veruela. Vera de Moncayo, province of Zaragoza	Pope Leo XIII		
Our Lady of Montserrat	11 September 1881	Abbey of Our Lady of Montserrat. Monistrol de Montserrat, province of Barcelona	Pope Leo XIII		
Mare de Déu de Lluc	10 August 1884	Santuari de Lluc. Escorca, Balearic Islands	Pope Leo XIII		
Virgen de Aránzazu	6 June 1886	Sanctuary of Arantzazu. Oñati, province of Gipuzkoa	Pope Leo XIII		
Mare de Déu de la Mercè	21 October 1888	Basilica of Our Lady of Mercy, Barcelona	Pope Leo XIII		
Virgin of Candelaria	13 October 1889	Basilica Shrine of Our Lady of Candelaria. Candelaria, province of Santa Cruz de Tenerife	Pope Leo XIII		
Our Lady of Begoña	8 September 1900	Basilica of Our Lady of Begoña. Bilbao, province of Biscay	Pope Leo XIII		

== 20th century ==
Official title of the image	Date of coronation	Place of devotion	Authorization by	Marian image	Shrine of devotion
Virgen de los Ojos Grandes	15 August 1904	Lugo Cathedral	Pope Pius X		
Nostra Senyora de la Misericòrdia	24 October 1904	Santuari de la Misericòrdia. Reus, province of Tarragona	Pope Pius X		
Virgen de los Reyes	4 December 1904	Seville Cathedral	Pope Pius X		
Our Lady of the Pillar	20 May 1905	Cathedral-Basilica of Our Lady of the Pillar. Zaragoza	Pope Pius X		
Virgen del Pino	7 September 1905	Basílica de Nuestra Señora del Pino. Teror, province of Las Palmas	Pope Pius X		
Nuestra Señora de los Remedios	27 April 1906	Shrine of Our Lady of Remedies. Fregenal de la Sierra, province of Badajoz	Pope Pius X		
Mare de Déu de la Serra	9 September 1906	Santuari de la Mare de Déu de la Serra. Montblanc, province of Tarragona	Pope Pius X		
Virgen de Gracia	7 September 1907	Shrine of Our Lady of Grace. Caudete, province of Albacete	Pope Pius X	Original image Current image, made in 1941	
Mare de Déu de la Misericòrdia	10 November 1907	Santuari de la Mare de Déu de la Misericòrdia. Canet de Mar, province of Barcelona	Pope Pius X	The canonical crown of 1907 (Note: The original image was a casualty of the Spanish Civil War, with only its canonical crown left intact. It was stolen in 1936, but was later found in a bad state in July 1941.) Current image, made in 1939	
Virgen de la Encina	8 September 1908	Basílica de la Encina. Ponferrada, province of León	Pope Pius X		
Our Lady of Cabeza	20 April 1909	Basilica Shrine of Our Lady of Cabeza. Andújar, province of Jaén	Pope Pius X	Original image Current image, made in 1944	
Our Lady of Vallivana	28 August 1910	Santuari de la Mare de Déu de Vallivana. Morella, province of Castellón	Pope Pius X		
Mare de Déu de la Candela	2 February 1911	Parish of Saint John the Baptist. Valls, province of Tarragona	Pope Pius X		
Mare de Déu del Claustre	9 June 1911	Tarragona Cathedral	Pope Pius X		
Nuestra Señora de las Angustias	20 September 1913	Basilica of Our Lady of Anguish. Granada	Pope Pius X		
Mare de Déu de la Misericòrdia	25 April 1915	Church of Our Lady of Misericordia. Campanar, Valencia	Pope Benedict XV		
Our Lady of Queralt	3 September 1916	Santuari de la Mare de Déu de Queralt. Berga, province of Barcelona	Pope Benedict XV		
Virgen de los Milagros	8 September 1916	Iglesia Mayor Prioral y Basílica de Nuestra Señora de los Milagros. El Puerto de Santa Maria, province of Cádiz	Pope Benedict XV		
Virgen de la Fuencisla	24 September 1916	Shrine of Our Lady of Fuencisla. Segovia	Pope Benedict XV		
Virgen de San Lorenzo	21 October 1917	Church of San Lorenzo. Valladolid	Pope Benedict XV		
Our Lady of Covadonga	8 September 1918	Basílica de Santa María la Real de Covadonga. Cangas de Onís, Asturias	Pope Benedict XV		
Mare de Déu del Castell	15 May 1919	Santuari de la Mare de Déu del Castell. Cullera, province of Valencia	Pope Benedict XV		
Virgin of El Rocio	8 June 1919	Hermitage of El Rocío. Almonte, province of Huelva	Pope Benedict XV		
Virgen de Monserrate (Original statue destroyed during the Civil War)	31 May 1920	Santuario de Monserrate. Orihuela, province of Alicante	Pope Benedict XV		
Mare de Déu del Miracle	8 August 1920	Convent and Shrine of Our Lady of the Miracle. Cocentaina, province of Alicante	Pope Benedict XV		
Mare de Déu de Montiel	8 September 1921	Santuari de la Mare de Déu de Montiel. Benaguasil, province of Valencia	Pope Benedict XV		
Virgen de Cortes	1 May 1922	Royal Monastery and Shrine of Nuestra Señora de Cortes. Alcaraz, province of Albacete	Pope Benedict XV (Note: The pontifical decree of coronation was granted by Pope Benedict XV on 17 August 1921. Vatican Apostolic Archive.)		
Mare de Déu de Valldeflors	8 September 1922	Basílica de la Mare de Déu de Valldeflors. Tremp, province of Lleida	Pope Pius XI		
Virgen de los Remedios	10 September 1922	Church of Our Lady of Remedies. Antequera, province of Málaga	Pope Pius XI		
Nuestra Señora de la Caridad de Cartagena	17 April 1923	Basilica of Our Lady of Charity. Cartagena, Region of Murcia	Pope Pius XI		
Virgen de Estíbaliz	6 May 1923	Shrine of Our Lady of Estíbaliz. Villafranca de Estíbaliz, province of Álava	Pope Pius XI		
Virgen de los Desamparados	12 May 1923	Basilica of Our Lady of the Forsaken. Valencia	Pope Benedict XV (Note: The decree of coronation is granted by Pope Benedict XV on 15 October 1921.)		
Virgen de las Virtudes	6 September 1923	Monastery and Shrine of Our Lady of Virtues. Villena, province of Alicante	Pope Pius XI	Original image (Note: The original image was a casualty of the Spanish Civil War in 1936.) Current image, made in 1939	
Mare de Déu de la Gleva	8 September 1923	Santuari de la Mare de Déu de la Gleva. Les Masies de Voltregà, province of Barcelona	Pope Pius XI		
Virgen de las Angustias (Original statue destroyed during the Civil War)	21 September 1923	Church of Our Lady of Anguish. Guadix, province of Granada	Pope Pius XI (Note: Papal decree of coronation granted on 24 February 1923. — Vatican Apostolic Archive.)		
Mare de Déu del Lledó	4 May 1924	Basílica de la Mare de Déu del Lledó. Castellón de la Plana, province of Castellón	Pope Pius XI		
Mare de Déu del Remei	6 October 1924	Parish Church of the Assumption. Albaida, province of Valencia	Pope Pius XI		
Virgen de la Soterraña	10 October 1924	Church of San Miguel. Olmedo, province of Valladolid	Pope Pius XI (Note: Papal decree of coronation granted on 23 September 1924. — Vatican Apostolic Archive.)		
Virgen de la Montaña	12 October 1924	Shrine of Our Lady of the Mountain. Cáceres	Pope Pius XI		
Virgen del Carmen	23 April 1925	Basilica of Our Lady of Mount Carmel. Jerez de la Frontera, province of Cádiz	Pope Pius XI		
Mare de Déu de la Salut	25 April 1925	Basilica of Saint James the Apostle. Algemesí, province of Valencia	Pope Pius XI	Original image (Note: The original image was a casualty of the Spanish Civil War in 1936.) Current image, made in 1944	
Virgen de Belén	5 May 1925	Santuario de Belén. Almansa, province of Albacete	Pope Pius XI	Original image (Note: The original image was a casualty of the Spanish Civil War in 1936.) Current image, made in 1939	
Virgen de las Maravillas	10 September 1925	Iglesia de Nuestra Señora de las Maravillas. Cehegín, Region of Murcia	Pope Pius XI		
Virgen de la Cabeza	24 April 1926	Shrine of Our Lady of Cabeza. Zújar, province of Granada	Pope Pius XI		
Virgen del Sagrario	30 May 1926	Toledo Cathedral	Pope Pius XI		
Nuestra Señora de la Fuensanta	24 April 1927	Sanctuary of Our Lady of Fuensanta. Murcia	Pope Pius XI		
Virgen de la Peña	13 August 1928	Church of Our Lady of the Rock. Brihuega, province of Guadalajara	Pope Pius XI		
Virgen del Romero	9 September 1928	Basílica de Nuestra Señora del Romero. Cascante, Navarre	Pope Pius XI		
Virgin of the Rosary	7 October 1928	Parish of Our Lady of the Rosary. Sedaví, province of Valencia	Pope Pius XI		
Our Lady of Guadalupe of Extremadura	12 October 1928	Monastery of Saint Mary of Guadalupe. Guadalupe, province of Cáceres	Pope Pius XI		
Virgin of the Incarnation	5 May 1929	Shrine of Our Lady of the Incarnation. Carrión de Calatrava, province of Ciudad Real	Pope Pius XI		
Virgen de los Dolores	18 August 1929	Parish Church of Saint Nicholas. A Coruña	Pope Pius XI		
Virgen de la Barquera	8 September 1929	Santuario de la Barquera. San Vicente de la Barquera, Cantabria	Pope Pius XI		
Virgin of Snows	20 October 1929	Shrine of Our Lady of Snows. Almagro, province of Ciudad Real	Pope Pius XI		
Virgen de Arrate	3 November 1929	Santuario de Nuestra Señora de Arrate. Eibar, province of Gipuzkoa	Pope Pius XI		
Virgen de la Antigua	24 November 1929	Seville Cathedral	Pope Pius XI		
Virgen de la Capilla	11 June 1930	Basilica of San Ildefonso. Jaén	Pope Pius XI		
Virgen de las Nieves	22 June 1930	Real Santuario Insular de Nuestra Señora de las Nieves. Santa Cruz de La Palma, province of Santa Cruz de Tenerife	Pope Pius XI		
Virgen del Valle	8 September 1930	Ermita de Nuestra Señora del Valle. Saldaña, province of Palencia	Pope Pius XI		
Virgen de la Piedad	14 September 1930	Iglesia de la Merced. Baza, province of Granada	Pope Pius XI		
Virgen de Atocha	Decreed on 24 September 1930	Basilica of Nuestra Señora de Atocha, Madrid	Pope Pius XI		
Virgen de la Antigua	28 September 1930	Santuario de Nuestra Señora de la Antigua. Guadalajara	Pope Pius XI		
Virgen del Camino	19 October 1930	Basílica de Nuestra Señora del Camino. Valverde de la Virgen, province of León	Pope Benedict XV (Note: The coronation was authorized by Pope Benedict XV in 1917.)		
Mare de Déu del Patrocini	19 October 1930	Hermitage of Our Lady of the Patronage. Foios, province of Valencia	Pope Pius XI		
Nuestra Señora de los Desamparados (Original statue destroyed during the Civil War)	12 September 1931	Parish Church of the Transfiguration. Ibi, province of Alicante	Pope Pius XI		
Mare de Déu de la Salut	13 September 1931	Basilica of Saint Michael the Archangel. Palma de Mallorca, Balearic Islands	Pope Pius XI		
Nuestra Señora de Sonsoles	15 August 1934	Ermita de Nuestra Señora de Sonsoles, Ávila	Pope Pius XI		
Mare de Déu de Sant Salvador	8 September 1934	Santuari de Sant Salvador. Felanitx, Balearic Islands	Pope Pius XI		
Virgen del Coro	8 September 1940	Basilica of Saint Mary of the Chorus. San Sebastián, province of Gipuzkoa	Pope Pius XII		
Virgen de la Victoria	8 February 1943	Basilica Shrine of Our Lady of Victory. Málaga	Pope Pius XII		
Mare de Déu del Toro	12 September 1943	Santuari de la Verge del Toro. Es Mercadal, Balearic Islands	Pope Pius XII		
Mare de Déu del Sagrat Cor	5 December 1943	Sanctuary of Our Lady of the Sacred Heart, Barcelona	Pope Pius XII		
Virgen de la Antigua	2 September 1945	Sanctuary of Our Lady of the Ancient. Urduña, province of Biscay	Pope Pius XI (Note: The pontifical decree of coronation was granted by Pope Pius XI on 15 February 1931. Vatican Apostolic Archive.)		
Virgen del Castañar	8 September 1946	Santuario de Nuestra Señora del Castañar. Béjar, province of Salamanca	Pope Pius XII		
Santa María la Real de Pamplona	21 September 1946	Pamplona Cathedral	Pope Pius XII		
Virgen de África	10 November 1946	Sanctuary of Saint Mary of Africa. Ceuta	Pope Pius XII		
Virgen del Rosario	4 May 1947	Church of Santo Domingo. Cádiz	Pope Pius XII		
Our Lady of Peace	15 May 1947	Church of Our Lady of Peace. Ronda, province of Málaga	Pope Pius XII		
Virgen de los Milagros	7 June 1947	Basilica of Our Lady of Miracles. Ágreda, province of Soria	Pope Pius XII		fraameless
Virgen de la Barca	15 August 1947	Santuario de Nuestra Señora de la Barca. Muxía, province of A Coruña	Pope Pius XII		
Mare de Déu de la Salut Nuestra Señora de la Fuente de la Salud	19 October 1947	Santuari de la Mare de Déu de la Salut. Sabadell, province of Barcelona	Pope Pius XII		
Virgen de la Salud	23 April 1948	Hermitage of Our Lady of Health. Onil, province of Alicante	Pope Pius XII		
Nuestra Señora de Araceli	2 May 1948	Santuario de Nuestra Señora de Araceli. Lucena, province of Córdoba	Pope Pius XII		
Virgen de la Victoria	13 June 1948	Church of Purísima Concepción. Melilla	Pope Pius XII		
Virgen de las Mercedes	2 July 1948	Sanctuary of Our Lady of Mercy. Bollullos Par del Condado, province of Huelva	Pope Pius XII		
Virgin of Almudena	11 November 1948	Madrid Cathedral	Pope Pius XII		
Virgen del Puerto	3 August 1949	Church of Saint Mary of the Port. Santoña, Cantabria	Pope Pius XII		
Inmaculado Corazón de María	16 October 1949	Parish of the Immaculate Heart of Mary and St. Anthony Mary Claret (Claretian Missionaries). Bilbao, province of Biscay	Pope Pius XII (Note: The pontifical decree of coronation was granted on 23 May 1948.)		
Virgin of Light	1 June 1950	Church of Our Lady of Light. Cuenca	Pope Pius XII		
Virgen of Consolation	10 September 1950	Hermitage of Our Lady of Consolation. Montánchez, province of Cáceres	Pope Pius XII		
Virgen de Urrategi	17 September 1950	Ermita de Nuestra Señora de Urrategi. Azkoitia, province of Gipuzkoa	Pope Pius XII		
Virgin of Grace	1 October 1950	Church of Our Lady of Grace. L'Énova, province of Valencia	Pope Pius XII		
Mare de Déu d'Aigües Vives	15 October 1950	Parish of the Assumption. Carcaixent, province of Valencia	Pope Pius XII		
Virgen de Loreto	12 November 1950	Convent and Shrine of Our Lady of Loreto. Espartinas, province of Seville	Pope Pius XII		
Virgen del Mar	8 April 1951	Shrine of Our Lady of the Sea. Almería	Pope Pius XII		
Virgen de la Coronada	7 October 1951	Santuario de Nuestra Señora de la Coronada. Villafranca de los Barros, province of Badajoz	Pope Pius XII		
Nuestra Señora del Carmen de San Fernando	12 October 1951	Church of Our Lady of Mount Carmel. San Fernando, province of Cádiz	Pope Pius XII		
Virgen de la Peña de Francia	4 June 1952	Santuario de la Peña de Francia. El Cabaco, province of Salamanca	Pope Pius XII		
Virgen de la Esperanza	8 June 1952	Church of Saint Cyprian, Toledo	Pope Pius XII		
Virgen de la Calle	8 June 1952	Church of Our Lady of the Street. Palencia	Pope Pius XII		
Virgen del Puerto	8 June 1952	Shrine of Our Lady of the Port. Plasencia, province of Cáceres	Pope Pius XII		
Virgen de Ujué	8 September 1952	Iglesia de Santa María de Ujué. Ujué, Navarre	Pope Pius XII		
Nuestra Señora de los Reyes	17 May 1953	Santuario Insular de Nuestra Señora de los Reyes de El Hierro. La Frontera, province of Santa Cruz de Tenerife	Pope Pius XII		
Mare de Déu dels Lliris	31 May 1953	Santuario de la Fuente Roja. Alcoi, province of Alicante	Pope Pius XII		
Nuestra Señora de la Hoz, Reina del Señorío	31 August 1953	Santuario de la Virgen de la Hoz. Corduente, province of Guadalajara	Pope Pius XII		
Virgen de la Victoria	18 October 1953	Hermitage of Our Lady of Victory. Trujillo, province of Cáceres	Pope Pius XII		
Puríssima Xiqueta	29 April 1954	Basílica de la Puríssima Xiqueta. Benissa, province of Alicante	Pope Pius XII		
Maria Auxiliadora	13 May 1954	Basilica of Mary Help of Christians. Seville	Pope Pius XII		
Virgen del Juncal	30 May 1954	Iglesia de Santa María del Juncal. Irun, province of Gipuzkoa	Pope Pius XII		
Inmaculada Concepción	13 June 1954	Church of the Immaculate Conception. Villalpando, province of Zamora	Pope Pius XII		
Virgen de Regla	5 September 1954	Shrine of Our Lady of the Rule. Chipiona, province of Cádiz	Pope Pius XII		
Virgen del Canto	5 September 1954	Hermitage of Our Lady of the Song. Toro, province of Zamora	Pope Pius XII		
Mare de Déu del Puig	9 September 1954	Monastery of Santa María. El Puig, province of Valencia	Pope Pius XII		
Mare de Déu del Tallat	21 September 1954	Santuari de la Mare de Déu del Tallat. Vallbona de les Monges, province of Lleida	Pope Pius XII		
Virgen de Tíscar	29 September 1954	Shrine of Our Lady of Tíscar. Quesada, province of Jaén	Pope Pius XII		
Virgen de Valvanera	15 October 1954	Monastery of Nuestra Señora de Valvanera. Anguiano, La Rioja	Pope Pius XII		
La Virgen Blanca	17 October 1954	Church of Saint Michael the Archangel. Vitoria-Gasteiz, province of Álava	Pope Pius XII		
Virgen de la Amargura	21 November 1954	Iglesia de San Juan de la Palma. Seville	Pope Pius XII		
Nuestra Señora de la Concepción	5 December 1954	Iglesia de Nuestra Señora de la Concepción. San Cristóbal de La Laguna, province of Santa Cruz de Tenerife	Pope Pius XII		
Virgen del Castillo	7 December 1954	Santuario de Nuestra Señora del Castillo. Yecla, Region of Murcia	Pope Pius XII		
Nuestra Señora de la Bien Aparecida	29 May 1955	Santuario de la Bien Aparecida. Ampuero, Cantabria	Pope Pius XII		
Mare de Déu del Miracle	30 May 1955	Església de la Mare de Déu del Miracle. Balaguer, province of Lleida	Pope Pius XII		
Mare de Déu del Vilar	30 May 1955	Santuari de la Mare de Déu del Vilar. Blanes, province of Girona	Pope Pius XII		
Mare de Déu de Cura	5 June 1955	Santuari de Cura. Algaida, Balearic Islands	Pope Pius XII		
Virgen de Piedraescrita	24 August 1955	Ermita de Nuestra Señora de Piedraescrita. Campanario, province of Badajoz	Pope Pius XII		
Virgen de la Salud de Barbatona	8 September 1955	Shrine of Our Lady of Health. Sigüenza, province of Guadalajara	Pope Pius XII		
Virgen de la Vega	8 September 1955	Basílica de Nuestra Señora de la Vega. Haro, La Rioja	Pope Pius XII		
Our Lady of Snows	9 October 1955	Ibiza Cathedral	Pope Pius XII		
Virgen de la Caridad	12 October 1955	Shrine of Our Lady of Charity. Illescas, province of Toledo	Pope Pius XII		
Virgen de Argeme	20 May 1956	Santuario de Nuestra Señora de Argeme. Coria, province of Cáceres	Pope Pius XII		
Virgen de los Llanos	27 May 1956	Albacete Cathedral	Pope Pius XII		
Virgen del Villar	10 June 1956	Basílica de Nuestra Señora del Villar. Corella, Navarre	Pope Pius XII		
Santísima Virgen Maria de las Nieves	5 August 1956	Church of Our Lady of Snows. El Fondó de les Neus, province of Alicante	Pope Pius XII		
Virgen del Burgo	8 September 1956	Iglesia de Nuestra Señora del Burgo. Alfaro, La Rioja	Pope Pius XII		
Virgen del Milagro de Fresnedo	9 September 1956	Santuario del Milagro. Solórzano, Cantabria	Pope Pius XII		
Virgen de la Luz	16 September 1956	Church of Our Lady of Light. Guía de Isora, province of Santa Cruz de Tenerife	Pope Pius XII		
Virgen de la Fuensanta	29 September 1956	Santuario de Nuestra Señora de la Fuensanta. Villanueva del Arzobispo, province of Jaén	Pope Pius XII		
Mare de Déu del Claustre	7 October 1956	Solsona Cathedral	Pope Pius XII		
Virgen del Prado	30 May 1957	Basilica of Nuestra Señora del Prado. Talavera de la Reina, province of Toledo	Pope Pius XII		
Mare de Déu de la Vallivana	8 September 1957	Ermita de Nuestra Señora de Vallivana. Picassent, province of Valencia	Pope Pius XII		
Virgen del Puy	25 May 1958	Basílica de Nuestra Señora del Puy. Estella-Lizarra, Navarre	Pope Pius XII		
Nuestra Señora de Angosto	15 June 1958	Santuario de Nuestra Señora de Angosto. Valdegovía, province of Álava	Pope Pius XII		
Virgen del Soto	6 September 1959	Ermita de Nuestra Señora del Soto. Santiurde de Toranzo, Cantabria	Pope John XXIII		
Virgen de los Remedios	27 September 1959	Santuario de Nuestra Señora de los Remedios de Guimarán. Carreño, Asturias	Pope John XXIII		
Mare de Déu de la Pietat	11 October 1959	Santuari de la Mare de Déu de la Pietat. Igualada, province of Barcelona	Pope John XXIII		
Virgen de la Antigua	12 June 1960	Basilica of the Assumption. Lekeitio, province of Biscay	Pope John XXIII		
Virgen de Belén	28 August 1960	Iglesia de Nuestra Señora de Belén. Carrión de los Condes, province of Palencia	Pope John XXIII		
Virgen del Remedio	8 September 1960	Shrine of Our Lady of the Remedy. Utiel, province of Valencia	Pope John XXIII		
Virgin of the Rosary	11 September 1960	Conventual Church of Saint Dominic. A Coruña	Pope John XXIII		
Virgin of Grace	30 October 1960	Church of Our Lady of Grace. Guadix, province of Granada	Pope John XXIII		
Virgin of the Rosary	13 May 1961	Church of Saint Dominic. Granada	Pope John XXIII		
Virgin of Mercy	28 May 1961	Basilica of Our Lady of Mercy. Jerez de la Frontera, province of Cádiz	Pope Pius XII		
Virgen de los Remedios	11 June 1961	Parish of Saint John the Baptist. Ocaña, province of Toledo	Pope John XXIII		
Virgen de Riánsares	7 September 1962	Santuario de Nuestra Señora de Riánsares. Tarancón, province of Cuenca	Pope John XXIII		
Virgen de Monlora	26 September 1962	Monasterio de Nuestra Señora de Monlora. Luna, province of Zaragoza	Pope John XXIII		
Virgen de Tejeda	26 May 1963	Monasterio de Tejeda. Garaballa, province of Cuenca	Pope John XXIII		
Virgen de la Franqueira	21 July 1963	Santuario de Santa María da Franqueira. A Cañiza, province of Pontevedra	Pope Pius XII (Note: Coronation authorized and granted by Pope Pius XII through decree dated 18 May 1958. The coronation is carried out in 1963, during the pontificate of Pope John XXIII.)		
Nuestra Señora de la Portería	19 March 1964	Shrine of Our Lady of Solitude, and Parish Church of Saint Francis of Assisi. Las Palmas de Gran Canaria, province of Las Palmas	Pope John XXIII		
Virgin of Consolation	1 May 1964	Shrine of Our Lady of Consolation. Utrera, province of Seville	Pope Paul VI		
Virgen de la Esperanza Macarena	31 May 1964	Basílica de la Macarena. Seville	Pope John XXIII		
Virgen de los Milagros	6 September 1964	Shrine of Our Lady of Miracles. Baños de Molgas, province of Ourense	Pope Paul VI		
Virgen del Río	7 April 1965 (Original statue (Note: The original image was destroyed by severe flooding on 19 October 1973.)) 20 September 2015 (Reconstruction)	Hermitage of Our Lady of the River. Huércal-Overa, province of Almería	Pope Paul VI Pope Francis (Note: Pope Francis, Congregation for Divine Worship and the Discipline of the Sacraments — Protocol Number: 359/15, Diocese of Almería, 24 June 2015. Vatican Apostolic Archive.)		
Virgen de los Dolores	9 May 1965	Church of Our Lady of Sorrows. Córdoba	Pope Paul VI		
Virgen de la Salud	31 May 1965	Iglesia de Santa Leocadia. Toledo	Pope Paul VI		
Virgen de la Caridad	15 August 1965	Basilica of Our Lady of Charity. Sanlúcar de Barrameda, province of Cádiz	Pope Paul VI		
Virgen de los Remedios	15 August 1965	Hermitage of Our Lady of Remedies. Serón, province of Almería	Pope Paul VI		
Virgen de la Purificación, La Tizná de Jerez	9 September 1965	Church of Our Lady of the Annunciation. Jerez del Marquesado, province of Granada	Pope Paul VI		
Virgen del Monte	22 May 1966	Shrine of Our Lady of the Mount. Bolaños de Calatrava, province of Ciudad Real	Pope Paul VI		
Virgen del Lluch	22 May 1966	Santuario de Nuestra Señora del Lluch. Alzira, Valencia	Pope Paul VI		
Mare de Déu del Lledo	26 June 1966	Santuari de la Mare de Déu del Lledo. Valls, province of Tarragona	Pope Paul VI		
Nuestra Señora de los Remedios	15 August 1966	Shrine of Our Lady of Remedies. Olvera, province of Cádiz	Pope Paul VI		
Virgen del Prado	28 May 1967	Ciudad Real Cathedral	Pope Paul VI		
Santa Maria la Major	28 May 1967	Church of Saint Mary Major. Inca, Balearic Islands	Pope Paul VI		
Mare de Déu de Núria	13 July 1967	Basílica de la Mare de Déu de Núria. Queralbs, province of Girona	Pope Paul VI (Note: Papal decree of coronation granted on 5 January 1965. — Vatican Apostolic Archive.)		
Virgen de Rus	27 May 1969	Parish of Saint James. San Clemente, province of Cuenca	Pope Paul VI (Note: Sacra Congregatio pro Sacramentis et Cultu Divino: Prot. n. 67/69, Diocese of Cuenca, 10 June 1969. Vatican Apostolic Archive.)		
Virgen de Sancho Abarca	22 September 1969	Parish of Saint Mary. Tauste, province of Zaragoza	Pope Paul VI		
Virgen de la Asunción	29 December 1970	Basilica of Our Lady of the Assumption. Elche, province of Alicante	Pope Paul VI		
Virgen del Henar	25 June 1972	Santuario de Nuestra Señora del Henar. Cuéllar, province of Segovia	Pope Paul VI		
Virgen de Valme	23 June 1973	Parish of Saint Mary Magdalene. Dos Hermanas, province of Seville	Pope Paul VI		
Virgen de la Hiniesta (Madonna and Child statue)	23 May 1974	Parish of Saint Julian. Seville	Pope John XXIII (Note: The coronation was authorized by Pope John XXIII on 15 February 1959.)		
Mare de Déu del Tura	25 May 1975	Shrine of Our Lady of the Bull. Olot, province of Girona	Pope Paul VI		
Virgen de Aguas Santas	8 September 1979	Parish of La Purísima Concepción. Villaverde del Río, province of Seville	Pope Paul VI (Note: The coronation was authorized by Pope Paul VI on 15 November 1970.)		
Virgen de la Esperanza de Triana	2 June 1984	Capilla de los Marineros, Seville	Pope John Paul II		
Virgen del Buen Retiro de los Desamparados del Saliente	7 August 1988	Santuario del Saliente. Albox, province of Almería	Pope John Paul II		
Virgen de la Cinta	26 September 1992	Shrine of Our Lady of the Ribbon, Huelva	Pope John Paul II		
Virgin of Miracles	14 June 1993	La Rábida Friary. Palos de la Frontera, province of Huelva	Pope John Paul II		
Virgen de la Fuensanta	2 October 1994	Santuario de Nuestra Señora de la Fuensanta, Córdoba	Pope John Paul II		
Mare de Déu de Paret-Delgada	25 May 1996	Santuari de la Mare de Déu de Paret-Delgada. La Selva del Camp, province of Tarragona	Pope John Paul II		
Virgen de Inodejo	14 September 1997	Santuario de Nuestra Señora de Inodejo. Las Fraguas, province of Soria	Pope John Paul II		
Nuestra Señora del Remedio	22 November 1998	Concatedral de San Nicolás, Alicante	Pope John Paul II		
Nuestra Señora de la Misericordia	30 May 1999	Basilica of El Salvador. Burriana, province of Castellón	Pope John Paul II		
Mare de Déu de Loreto	10 September 2000	Shrine of Our Lady of Loreto. Ulldemolins, province of Tarragona	Pope John Paul II (Note: Pope John Paul II, Congregation for Divine Worship and the Discipline of the Sacraments — Protocol Number: 834/99/L, Archdiocese of Tarragona, 15 May 1999. Vatican Apostolic Archive.)		

== 21st century ==
Official title of the image	Date of coronation	Place of devotion	Authorization by	Marian image	Shrine of devotion
Nuestra Señora de los Ángeles	19 May 2002	Hermitage of Our Lady of the Angels. Getafe, Community of Madrid	Pope John Paul II (Note: Pope John Paul II, Congregation for Divine Worship and the Discipline of the Sacraments — Protocol Number: 643/02/L, Diocese of Getafe, 24 April 2002. Vatican Apostolic Archive.)		
Virgen de Linarejos	11 January 2004	Santuario Diocesano de Nuestra Señora de Linarejos. Linares, province of Jaén	Pope John Paul II (Note: Pope John Paul II, Congregation for Divine Worship and the Discipline of the Sacraments — Protocol Number: 2342/03/L, Diocese of Jaén, 9 December 2003. Vatican Apostolic Archive.)		
Virgen de la Sierra	4 June 2005	Santuario de Nuestra Señora de la Sierra. Cabra, province of Córdoba	Pope John Paul II (Note: Pope John Paul II, Congregation for Divine Worship and the Discipline of the Sacraments — Protocol Number: 387/04/L, Diocese of Córdoba, 16 March 2004. Vatican Apostolic Archive.)		
Virgen del Collado	16 July 2006	Church of Our Lady of the Hill. Santisteban del Puerto, province of Jaén	Pope Benedict XVI (Note: Pope Benedict XVI, Congregation for Divine Worship and the Discipline of the Sacraments — Protocol Number: 305/06/L, Diocese of Jaén, 16 March 2006. Vatican Apostolic Archive.)		
Virgen del Espino	9 September 2006	Ermita de Nuestra Señora del Espino. Chauchina, province of Granada	Pope Benedict XVI (Note: Pope Benedict XVI, Congregation for Divine Worship and the Discipline of the Sacraments — Protocol Number: 881/06/L, Archdiocese of Granada, 17 July 2006. Vatican Apostolic Archive.)		
María Santísima de la Misericordia	20 May 2007	Church of San Cecilio. Granada	Pope Benedict XVI (Note: Pope Benedict XVI, Congregation for Divine Worship and the Discipline of the Sacraments — Protocol Number: 882/06/L, Archdiocese of Granada, 17 July 2006. Vatican Apostolic Archive.)		
Virgen del Martirio	15 August 2007	Parish of Our Lady of the Martyrdom. Ugíjar, province of Granada	Pope Benedict XVI (Note: Pope Benedict XVI, Congregation for Divine Worship and the Discipline of the Sacraments — Protocol Number: 883/06/L, Archdiocese of Granada, 17 July 2006. Vatican Apostolic Archive.)		
Mare de Déu de Gràcia	2 September 2007	Hermitage of Our Lady of Grace. Villareal, province of Castellón	Pope Benedict XVI (Note: Pope Benedict XVI, Congregation for Divine Worship and the Discipline of the Sacraments — Protocol Number: 748/07/L, Diocese of Segorbe-Castellón, 26 June 2007. Vatican Apostolic Archive.)		
Virgen de Carejas	24 August 2008	Ermita de Nuestra Señora de Carejas. Paredes de Nava, province of Palencia	Pope Benedict XVI (Note: Pope Benedict XVI, Congregation for Divine Worship and the Discipline of the Sacraments — Protocol Number: 1157/07/L, Diocese of Palencia, 26 October 2007. Vatican Apostolic Archive.)		
Virgen del Capítulo	20 September 2008	Church of the Assumption. Trasobares, province of Zaragoza	Pope Benedict XVI (Note: Pope Benedict XVI, Congregation for Divine Worship and the Discipline of the Sacraments — Protocol Number: 658/08/L, Diocese of Tarazona, 19 June 2008. Vatican Apostolic Archive.)		
Mary Help of Christians	10 May 2009	Church of Mary Help of Christians. Córdoba	Pope Benedict XVI (Note: Pope Benedict XVI, Congregation for Divine Worship and the Discipline of the Sacraments — Protocol Number: 312/08/L, Diocese of Córdoba, 2 April 2008. Vatican Apostolic Archive.)		
Virgen de Belén	8 May 2010	Ermita de Nuestra Señora de Belén. Palma del Río, province of Córdoba	Pope Benedict XVI (Note: Pope Benedict XVI, Congregation for Divine Worship and the Discipline of the Sacraments — Protocol Number: 61/10/L, Diocese of Córdoba, 9 February 2010. Vatican Apostolic Archive.)		
Virgen del Yugo	30 May 2010	Ermita de Nuestra Señora del Yugo. Arguedas, Navarre	Pope Benedict XVI (Note: Pope Benedict XVI, Congregation for Divine Worship and the Discipline of the Sacraments — Protocol Number: 1238/09/L, Archdiocese of Pamplona and Tudela, 14 July 2009. Vatican Apostolic Archive.)		
Virgen del Campo	4 September 2010	Ermita de la Madre de Dios. Cañete de las Torres, province of Córdoba	Pope Benedict XVI (Note: Pope Benedict XVI, Congregation for Divine Worship and the Discipline of the Sacraments — Protocol Number: 1238/09/L, Diocese of Córdoba, 27 January 2010. Vatican Apostolic Archive.)		
Maria Santísima de la Aurora del Albayzín	8 May 2011	Iglesia de San Miguel Bajo y Nuestra Señora de la Aurora. Granada	Pope Benedict XVI (Note: The decree was granted by Pope Benedict XVI through the Congregation for Divine Worship and the Discipline of the Sacraments, on March 31, 2009, for the Roman Catholic Archdiocese of Granada. Though, the said decree was not recorded in the Summarium Decretorum for January-June 2009. Vatican Apostolic Archive.)		
Virgen de la Purísima Concepción de Linares	14 May 2011	Santuario de Nuestra Señora de Linares. Córdoba	Pope Benedict XVI (Note: Pope Benedict XVI, Congregation for Divine Worship and the Discipline of the Sacraments — Protocol Number: 45/11/L, Diocese of Córdoba, 2 February 2011. Vatican Apostolic Archive.)		
Mare de Déu de La Aldea	12 June 2011	Hermitage of Our Lady of L'Aldea, province of Tarragona	Pope Benedict XVI (Note: Pope Benedict XVI, Congregation for Divine Worship and the Discipline of the Sacraments — Protocol Number: 96/11/L, Diocese of Tortosa, 9 March 2011. Vatican Apostolic Archive.)		
Mare de Déu del Roser	7 October 2011	Parish of Our Lady of the Nativity. Almassora, province of Castellón	Pope Benedict XVI (Note: Pope Benedict XVI, Congregation for Divine Worship and the Discipline of the Sacraments — Protocol Number: 366/11/L, Diocese of Segorbe-Castellón, 15 June 2011. Vatican Apostolic Archive.)		
Virgen del Castillo	12 October 2012	Ermita de Nuestra Señora del Castillo. Lebrija, province of Seville	Pope Benedict XVI (Note: Pope Benedict XVI, Congregation for Divine Worship and the Discipline of the Sacraments — Protocol Number: 1064/11/L, Archdiocese of Seville, 17 December 2011. Vatican Apostolic Archive.)		
Nuestra Señora de las Mercedes	14 August 2014	Church of Saint Mary Major. Alcalá la Real, province of Jaén	Pope Francis (Note: Pope Francis, Congregation for Divine Worship and the Discipline of the Sacraments — Protocol Number: 55/14/L, Diocese of Jaén, 3 March 2014. Vatican Apostolic Archive.)		
Virgen de Alharilla	23 August 2014	Santuario de Nuestra Señora de Alharilla. Porcuna, province of Jaén	Pope Francis (Note: Pope Francis, Congregation for Divine Worship and the Discipline of the Sacraments — Protocol Number: 543/13/L, Diocese of Jaén, 15 October 2013. Vatican Apostolic Archive.)		
María Santísima de la Amargura	30 May 2015	Convent of the Commanders of Saint James. Granada	Pope Francis (Note: Pope Francis, Congregation for Divine Worship and the Discipline of the Sacraments — Protocol Number: 157/14/L, Archdiocese of Granada, 27 May 2014. Vatican Apostolic Archive.)		
Virgen de la Antigua	6 August 2016	Church of the Incarnation. Almuñécar, province of Granada	Pope Francis (Note: Pope Francis, Congregation for Divine Worship and the Discipline of the Sacraments — Protocol Number: 134/16, Archdiocese of Granada, 14 May 2016. Vatican Apostolic Archive.)		
Virgen de Gádor	3 September 2016	Ermita de Nuestra Señora de Gádor. Berja, province of Almería	Pope Francis (Note: Pope Francis, Congregation for Divine Worship and the Discipline of the Sacraments — Protocol Number: 40/16, Diocese of Almería, 2 February 2016. Vatican Apostolic Archive.)		
Virgen de Butarque	20 May 2017	Ermita de Nuestra Señora de Butarque. Leganés, Community of Madrid	Pope Francis (Note: Pope Francis, Congregation for Divine Worship and the Discipline of the Sacraments — Protocol Number: 304/16, Diocese of Getafe, 14 September 2016. Vatican Apostolic Archive.)		
Virgin of Grace	16 July 2017	Church of Saint Michael the Archangel. Altura, province of Castellón	Pope Francis (Note: Pope Francis, Congregation for Divine Worship and the Discipline of the Sacraments — Protocol Number: 10/17, Diocese of Segorbe-Castellón, 8 June 2017. Vatican Apostolic Archive.)		
Virgen de la Cabeza	17 October 2017	Parish of the Assumption. El Carpio, province of Córdoba	Pope Francis (Note: Pope Francis, Dicastery for Divine Worship and the Discipline of the Sacraments — Protocol Number: 378/16, Diocese of Córdoba, 24 September 2016. Vatican Apostolic Archive.)		
Virgen de O Corpiño	24 June 2018	Santuario de Nuestra Señora de O Corpiño. Lalín, province of Pontevedra	Pope Francis (Note: Pope Francis, Congregation for Divine Worship and the Discipline of the Sacraments — Protocol Number: 207/17, Diocese of Lugo, 15 May 2017. Vatican Apostolic Archive.)		
Virgen del Carmen	28 July 2018	Santuario de Nuestra Señora del Carmen. Rute, province of Córdoba	Pope Francis (Note: Pope Francis, Congregation for Divine Worship and the Discipline of the Sacraments — Protocol Number: 269/17, Diocese of Córdoba, 23 July 2017. Vatican Apostolic Archive.)		
Virgen del Carmen	29 July 2018	Santuario de Nuestra Señora del Carmen. Burgo de Osma-Ciudad de Osma, province of Soria	Pope Francis (Note: Pope Francis, Congregation for Divine Worship and the Discipline of the Sacraments — Protocol Number: 342/17, Diocese of Osma-Soria, 31 July 2017. Vatican Apostolic Archive.)		
Nuestra Señora de la Esperanza	13 October 2018	Parroquia de San Gil y Santa Ana, Granada	Pope Francis (Note: Pope Francis, Congregation for Divine Worship and the Discipline of the Sacraments — Protocol Number: 588/16, Archdiocese of Granada, 26 January 2017. Vatican Apostolic Archive.)		
Mare de Déu de l'Esperança	22 December 2018	Parish of Saint James. Figuerola del Camp, province of Tarragona	Pope Francis (Note: Pope Francis, Congregation for Divine Worship and the Discipline of the Sacraments — Protocol Number: 350/17, Archdiocese of Tarragona, 25 July 2017. Vatican Apostolic Archive.)		
Nuestra Señora de la Soledad	4 May 2019	Parish of Saint Mary Magdalene. Ciempozuelos, Community of Madrid	Pope Francis (Note: Pope Francis, Congregation for Divine Worship and the Discipline of the Sacraments — Protocol Number: 144/18, Diocese of Getafe, 20 April 2018. Vatican Apostolic Archive.)		
Nuestra Señora de los Ángeles	18 May 2019	Chapel of Our Lady of the Angels. Seville	Pope Francis (Note: Pope Francis, Congregation for Divine Worship and the Discipline of the Sacraments — Protocol Number: 67/19, Archdiocese of Seville, 25 March 2019. Vatican Apostolic Archive.)		
Virgen de Consolación	1 June 2019	Church of the Assumption. Valdepeñas, province of Ciudad Real	Pope Francis (Note: Pope Francis, Congregation for Divine Worship and the Discipline of the Sacraments — Protocol Number: 517/16, Diocese of Ciudad Real, 30 November 2016. Vatican Apostolic Archive.)		
Virgen del Socorro	30 April 2022	Ermita de Nuestra Señora del Socorro. Villamanta, Community of Madrid	Pope Francis (Note: Pope Francis, Congregation for Divine Worship and the Discipline of the Sacraments — Protocol Number: 233/19, Diocese of Getafe, 12 June 2019. Vatican Apostolic Archive.)		
Inmaculada Concepción	7 May 2022	Parish of the Immaculate Conception. Herencia, province of Ciudad Real	Pope Francis (Note: Pope Francis, Congregation for Divine Worship and the Discipline of the Sacraments — Protocol Number: 12/19, Diocese of Ciudad Real, 24 January 2019. Vatican Apostolic Archive.)		
Virgen de la Antigua	3 September 2022	Parish of the Assumption. El Casar, province of Guadalajara	Pope Francis (Note: Pope Francis, Congregation for Divine Worship and the Discipline of the Sacraments — Protocol Number: 19/22, Diocese of Sigüenza-Guadalajara, 22 March 2022. Vatican Apostolic Archive.)		
Virgen de la Fuensanta	1 October 2022	Santuario de Nuestra Señora de la Fuensanta. Alcaudete, province of Jaén	Pope Francis (Note: Pope Francis, Congregation for Divine Worship and the Discipline of the Sacraments — Protocol Number: 591/19, Diocese of Jaén, 27 January 2020. Vatican Apostolic Archive.)		
Virgen de la Paz y Esperanza	15 October 2022	Conventual Church of the Holy Angel. Córdoba	Pope Francis (Note: Pope Francis, Congregation for Divine Worship and the Discipline of the Sacraments — Protocol Number: 147/20, Diocese of Córdoba, 15 July 2020. Vatican Apostolic Archive.)		
Virgen de la Soledad	1 November 2022	Monasterio de San Jerónimo, Granada	Pope Francis (Note: Pope Francis, Dicastery for Divine Worship and the Discipline of the Sacraments — Protocol Number: 491/22, Archdiocese of Granada, 18 October 2022. Vatican Apostolic Archive.)		
Virgen del Carmen	19 July 2025	Parish of Saint Michael the Archangel. Palenciana, province of Córdoba	Pope Francis (Note: Pope Francis, Dicastery for Divine Worship and the Discipline of the Sacraments — Protocol Number: 568/24, Diocese of Córdoba, 1 November 2024. Vatican Apostolic Archive.)		
Virgen del Carmen	27 September 2025	Parish of Our Lady of Mount Carmel. Montoro, province of Córdoba	Pope Francis (Note: Pope Francis, Dicastery for Divine Worship and the Discipline of the Sacraments — Protocol Number: 231/25, Diocese of Córdoba, 4 April 2025. Vatican Apostolic Archive.)		
Virgen de Luna	7 December 2025	Hermitage of Our Lady of Luna. Pozoblanco, province of Córdoba	Pope Francis (Note: Pope Francis, Dicastery for Divine Worship and the Discipline of the Sacraments — Protocol Number: 12/25, Diocese of Córdoba, 10 January 2025. Vatican Apostolic Archive.)		
Virgen del Milagro	17 May 2026	Parish Church of Saint Mary Major. Villamuriel de Cerrato, province of Palencia	Pope Leo XIV (Note: Pope Leo XIV granted the coronation of the statue through a decree from the Dicastery for Divine Worship and the Discipline of the Sacraments dated 25 March 2026, for the Diocese of Palencia. Vatican Apostolic Archive.)		
Virgen del Alcázar	26 September 2026	Church of Saint Andrew. Baeza, province of Jaén	Pope Leo XIV		
