= San Cipriano =

San Cipriano (Esperanto, Italian, Portuguese and Spanish for Saint Cyprian), may refer to several places:

- San Cipriano, Valle del Cauca, Colombian village in the department of Valle del Cauca
- San Cipriano, a subdivision of the Italian municipality of Roncade in the province of Treviso
- San Cipriano d'Aversa, Italian municipality in the province of Caserta
- San Cipriano Picentino, Italian municipality in the province of Salerno
- San Cipriano Po, Italian municipality in the province of Pavia
- San Cipriano (Madrid Metro), station on Line 9 of the Madrid Metro
- Church of San Cipriano, Toledo

== Other language Wikipedias ==
- San Cipriano (Argentina), a village of the Entre Ríos Province in Argentina
- San Cipriano de Bribes, populated place in Spain
- San Cipriano del Condado, populated place in Spain
- San Cipriano de Rueda, populated place in Spain
