= Tower of San Cristóbal =

Coordinates: 39.8555°N 4.0274°W

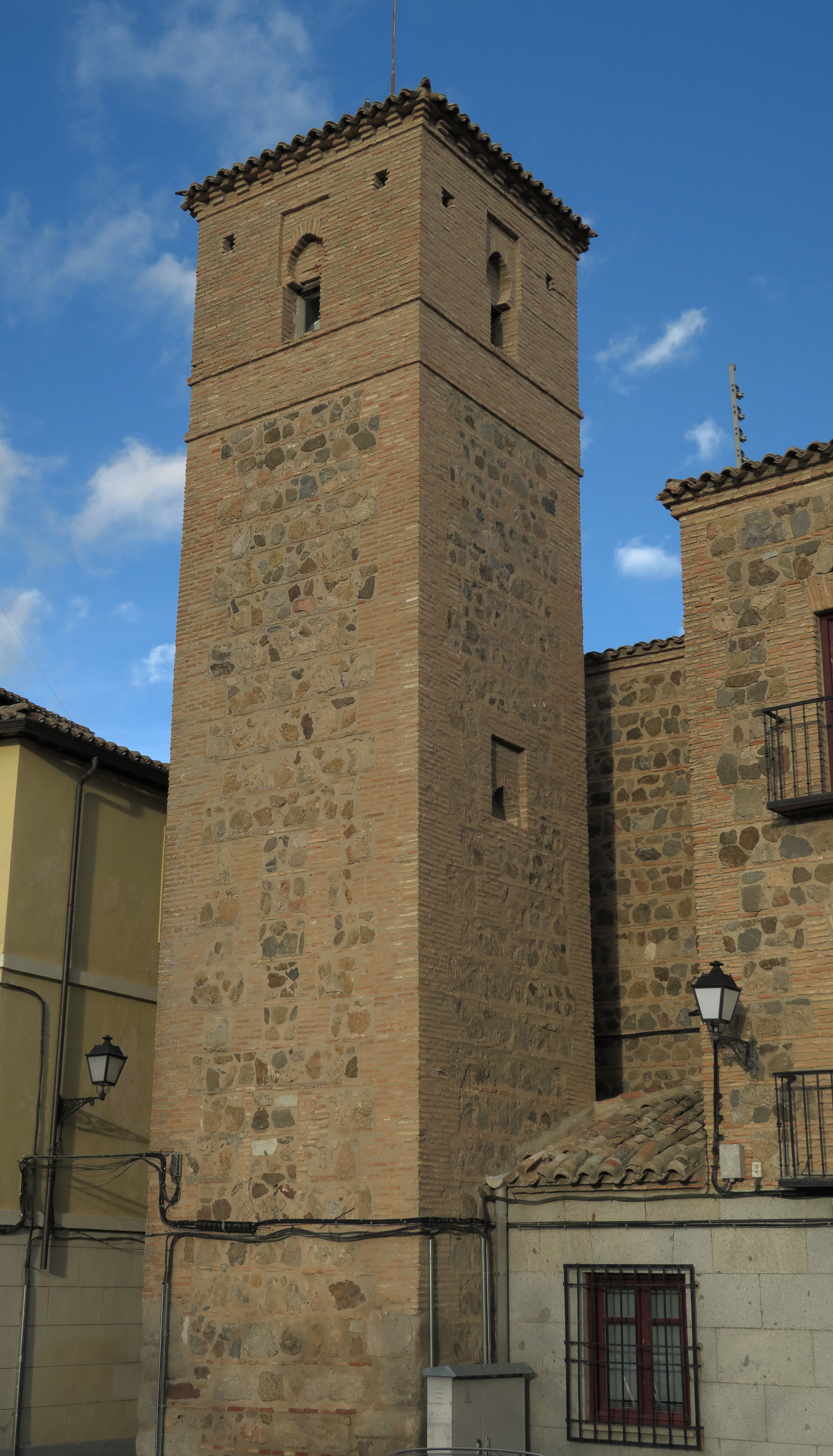
Tower of San Cristobal, Toledo

The Tower of San Cristóbal is a Mudéjar tower belonging to the Church of San Cristóbal in Toledo (Spain).

== History ==
The missing church seemed to be associated with a mosque founded by Fathibn Ibrahim al'Umawi', known as al-Qasari (934 - 1013). Evidence indicates the existence of a church at San Cristóbal as of 1187. In the 15th century, transformations were made to adapt it to the Greco-Roman style.

In 1842 the parochiality was knocked down, while the building was broken up and sold to individuals who later destroyed the pieces.

In 1845 the demolition of the church proceeded, in view of its ruinous state. The only remnant was the tower built on the foundations of an earlier minaret.

The tower was rebuilt between the second half of the 12th century and the first half of the 13th century, when it was linked to the first phase of Toledan Mudéjar.

== The death of tower ==
The tower is of square plan with a central machon, around which revolved the stairs. It is made of taped masonry which, at the base, before its restoration, had the appearance of ashlar. To these first strings corresponded chains of stone, while in the rest of the tower these are of brick. One wall reused a Visigothic piece.

The organization of the spans is in a pointed horseshoe arch, framed in a slight protrusion by a side arranged in the manner of an alphabet. Such an organization has evident Almohad links, which is further supported by its presence in the church of San Cipriano in Toledo. Despite this, it is an unusual model in the Toledan Mudéjar.
