= Basílica de Nuestra Señora del Pino =

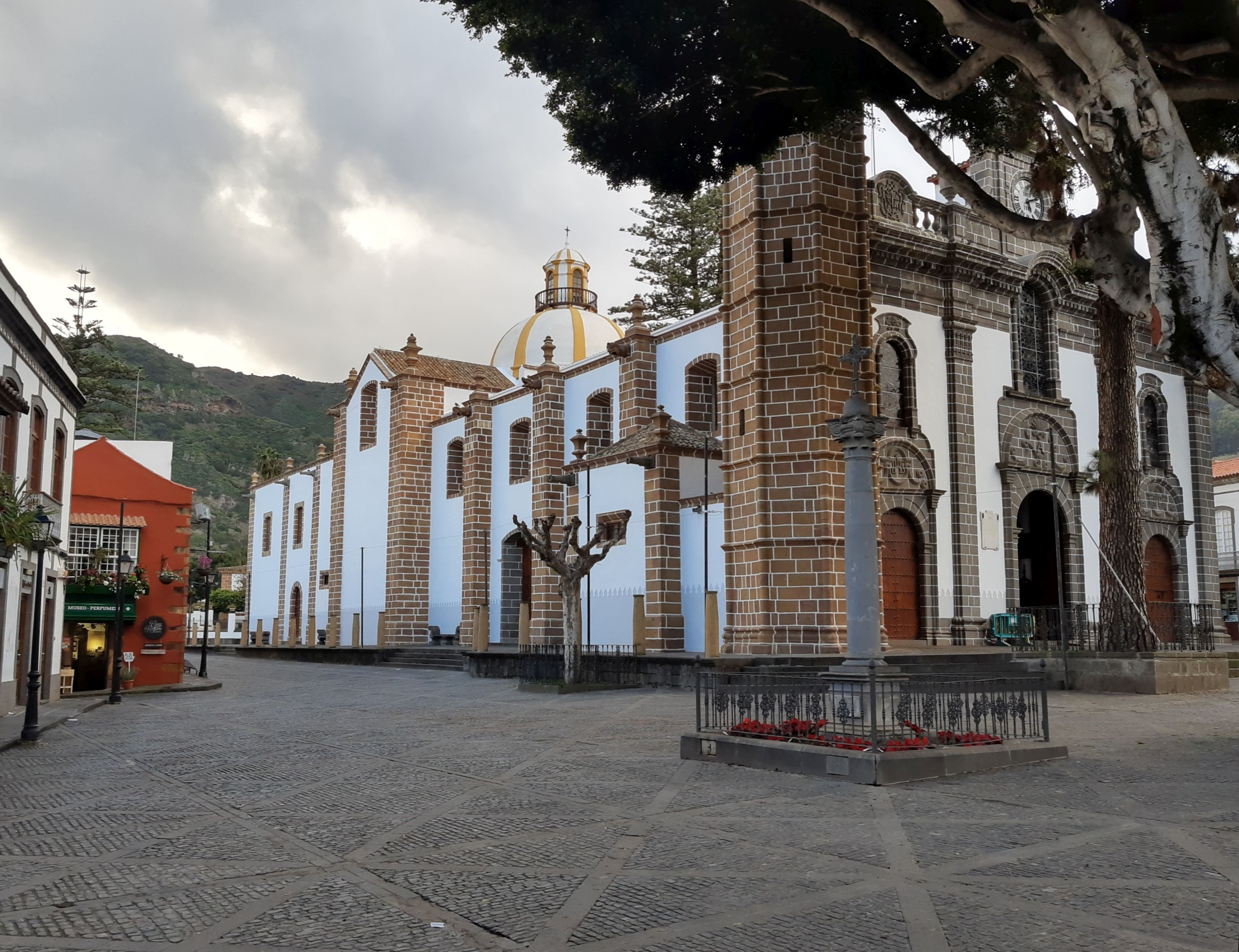
- Basílica de Nuestra Señora del Pino
- 28.0593°N 15.5478°W
- Location: Teror, Gran Canaria
- Country: Spain
- Denomination: Catholic

History
- Dedication: Virgen del Pino
- Consecrated: 1767

Architecture
- Functional status: active Basilica minor
- Heritage designation: RI-51-0004241
- Designated: 1977
- Style: Neoclassical

Administration
- Diocese: Diocese of Canarias

The Basílica de Nuestra Señora del Pino is a Catholic church and parish in Teror, Gran Canaria, Canary Islands, Spain. The present building in neoclassical style was built from 1760 to 1767. It is dedicated to the Virgen del Pino.

== History ==
The Teror parish was founded in 1505. The present church was built in neoclassical style from 1760, and was consecrated in 1767, dedicated to the Virgen del Pino who had appeared at the place according to legend. She was declared the patron saint of the Gran Canaria, and the church a basilica, on 30 August 1914.

On 12 January 1916, the building was declared a papal Basilica minor, the first such church in the Canary Islands.
