= Teror =

- Municipality
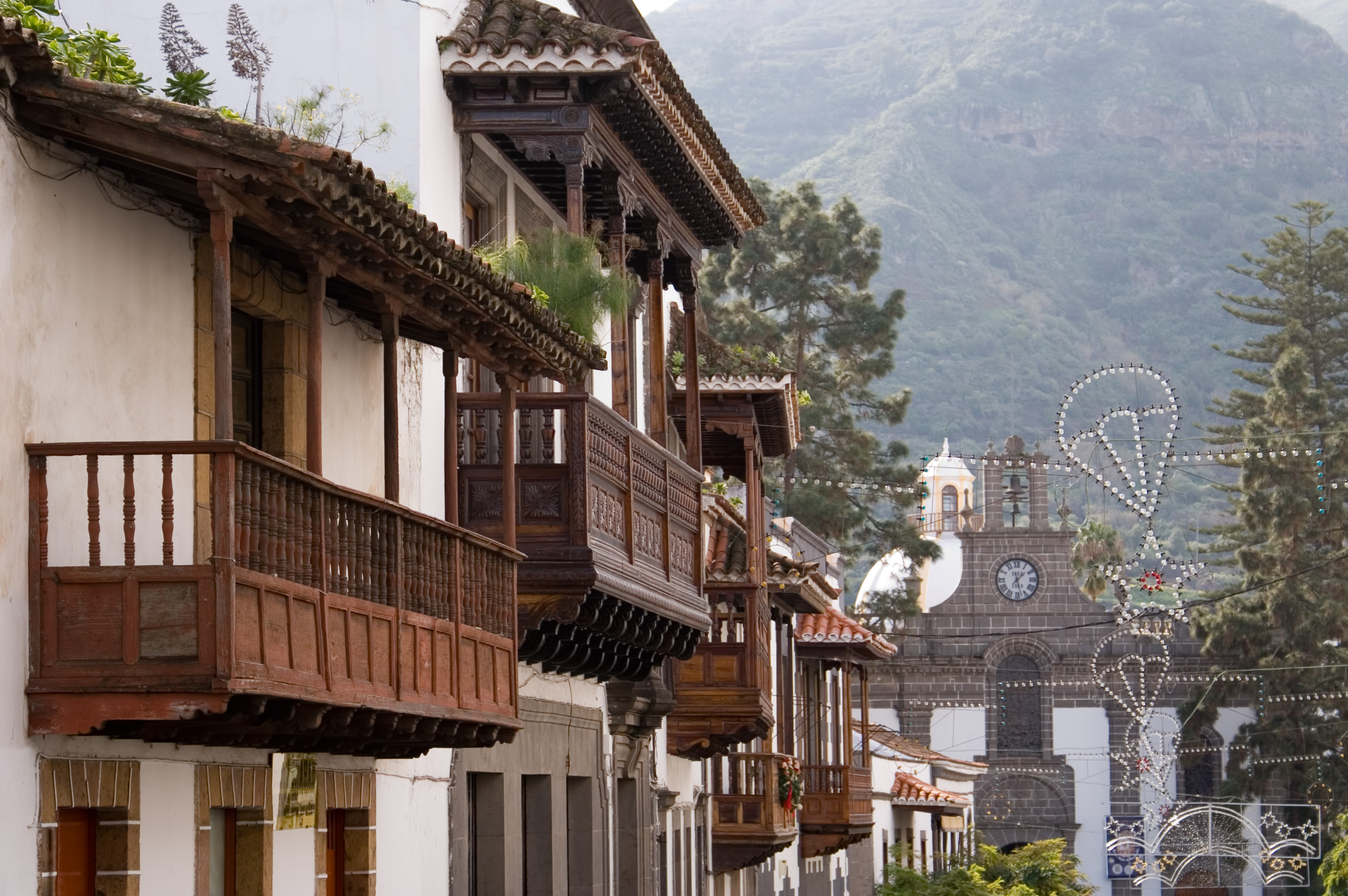
- Calle Real, Teror

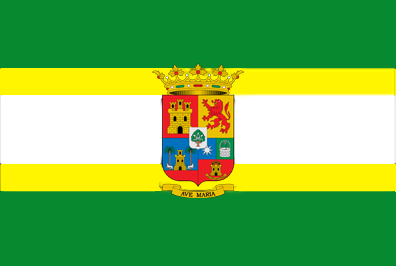
- Flag Coat of arms

- Municipal location in Gran Canaria

- Location in the province of Las Palmas Teror (Canary Islands) Teror (Spain, Canary Islands)
- Coordinates: 28°3′32″N 15°32′51″W
- Country: Spain
- Autonomous Region: Canary Islands
- Province: Las Palmas
- Island: Gran Canaria

Government
  - Mayor: Pedro Manuel Rodríguez Pérez (CC)

Area
  - Total: 25.70 km^{2} (9.92 sq mi)
- Elevation (AMSL): 543 m (1,781 ft)

Population (2025-01-01)
  - Total: 13,211
  - Density: 514.0/km^{2} (1,331/sq mi)
- Time zone: UTC+0 (CET)
  - Summer (DST): UTC+1 (CEST (GMT +1))
- Postal code: 35330
- Area code: +34 (Spain) + 928 (Las Palmas)
- Website: www.teror.es

Teror is a municipality in the northern part of the island of Gran Canaria in the Province of Las Palmas in the Canary Islands. Its population is 12,671 (2013), and the town area is 25.70 km^{2}. Teror is situated in the mountains and borders Las Palmas to the west and is part of its urban area. September 8 is the local festivity celebrating Virgen del Pino (virgin of the pine, patron of the Gran Canaria).

Teror has a well preserved old town centre, which is under monument protection. There is a basilica, the quiet Virgin of the Pine Square in front of it, and neatly fronted buildings along the picturesque Calle Real de la Plaza street. After shepherds witnessed a Marian apparition nearby on 8 September 1481, Teror became the most important pilgrimage destination of Gran Canaria, and, as a result, rather prosperous. White houses with wooden balconies, where many of the island’s older families congregated, are typical of the town.

Mineral water is an important product of Teror. There's a weekly market (mercadillo) on Sundays.

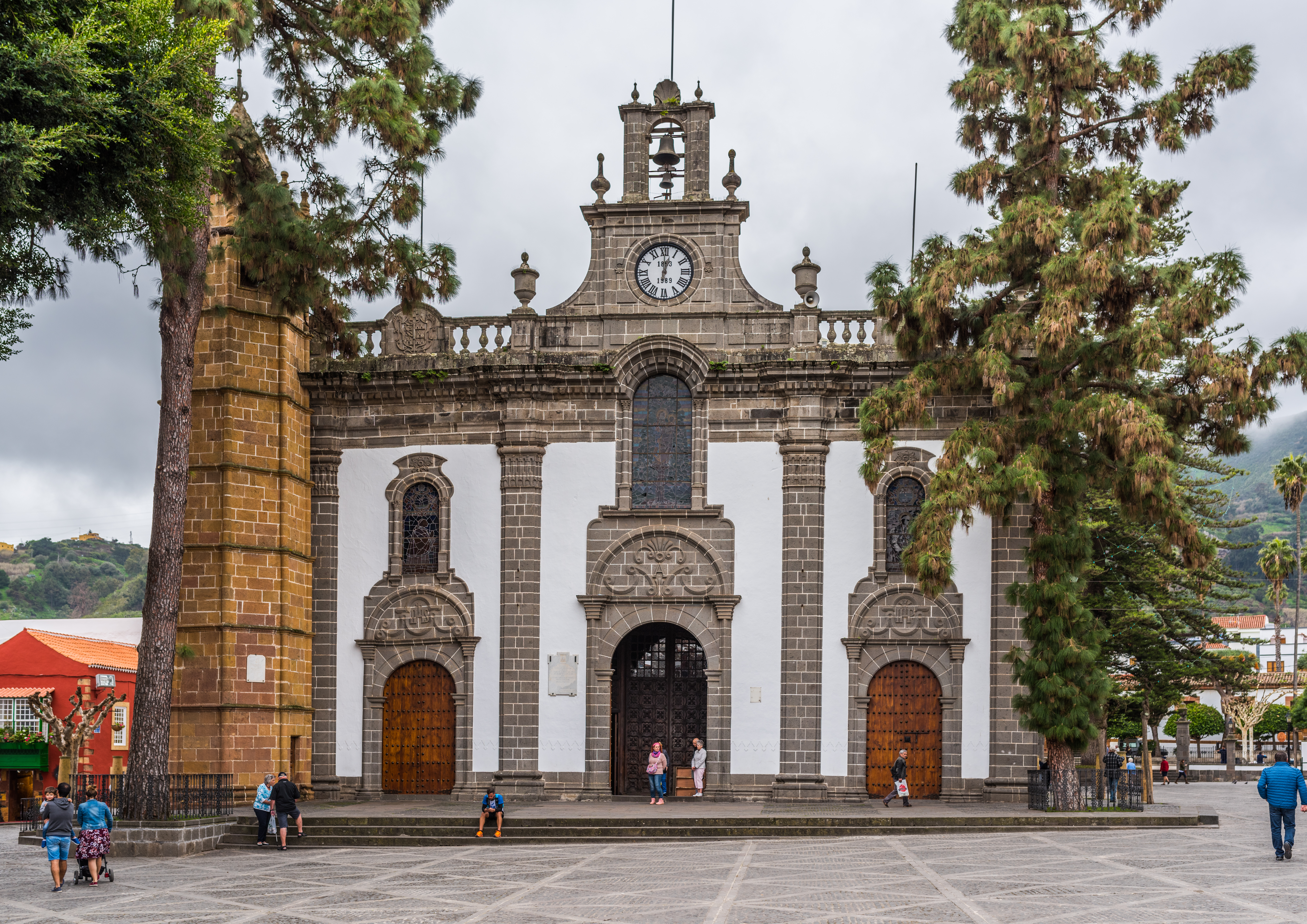
Basilika "Nuestra Señora del Pino"

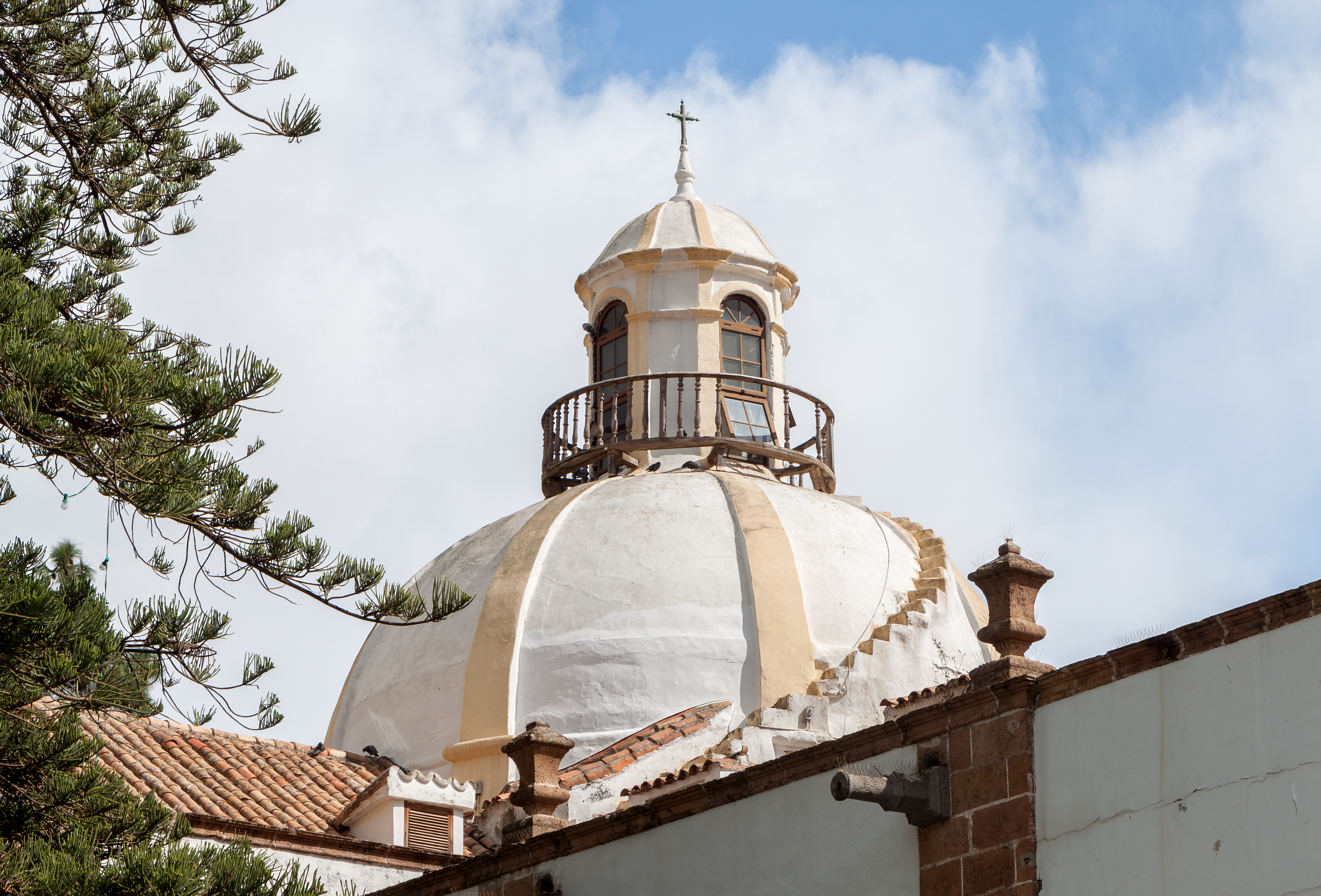
Cupola of the Basílica de Nuestra Señora del Pino

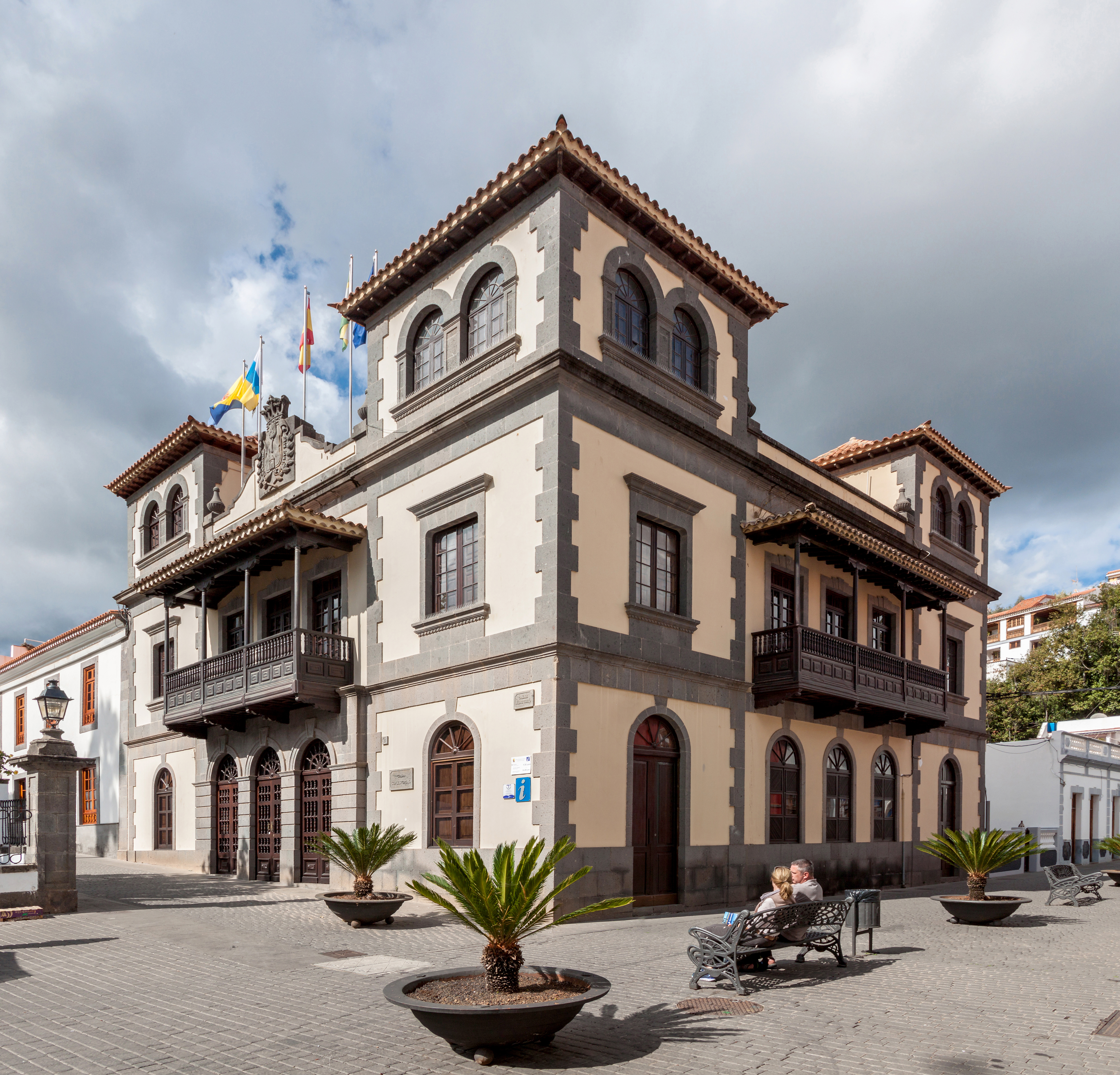
Townhall

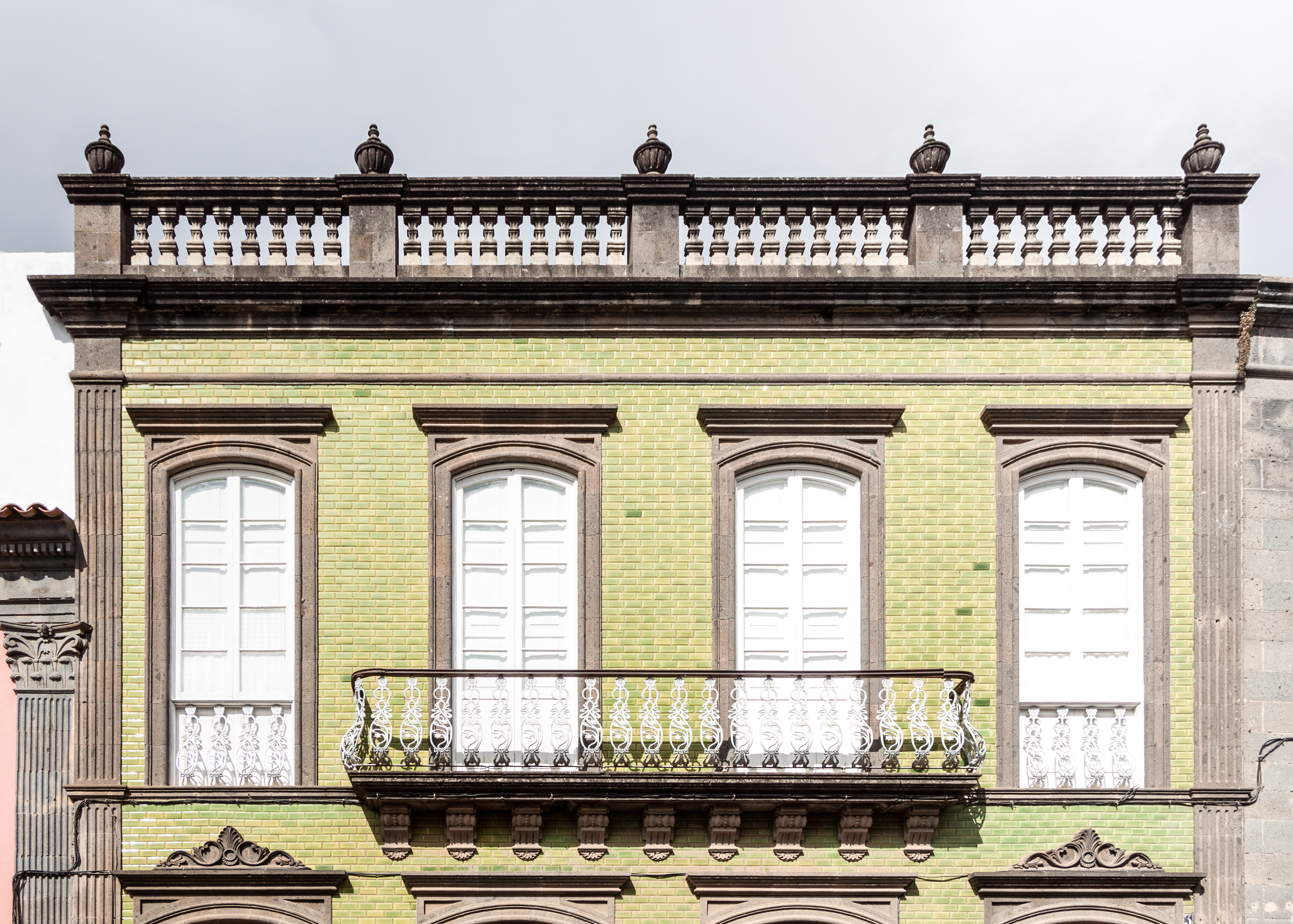
Facade, Calle Real de la Plaza

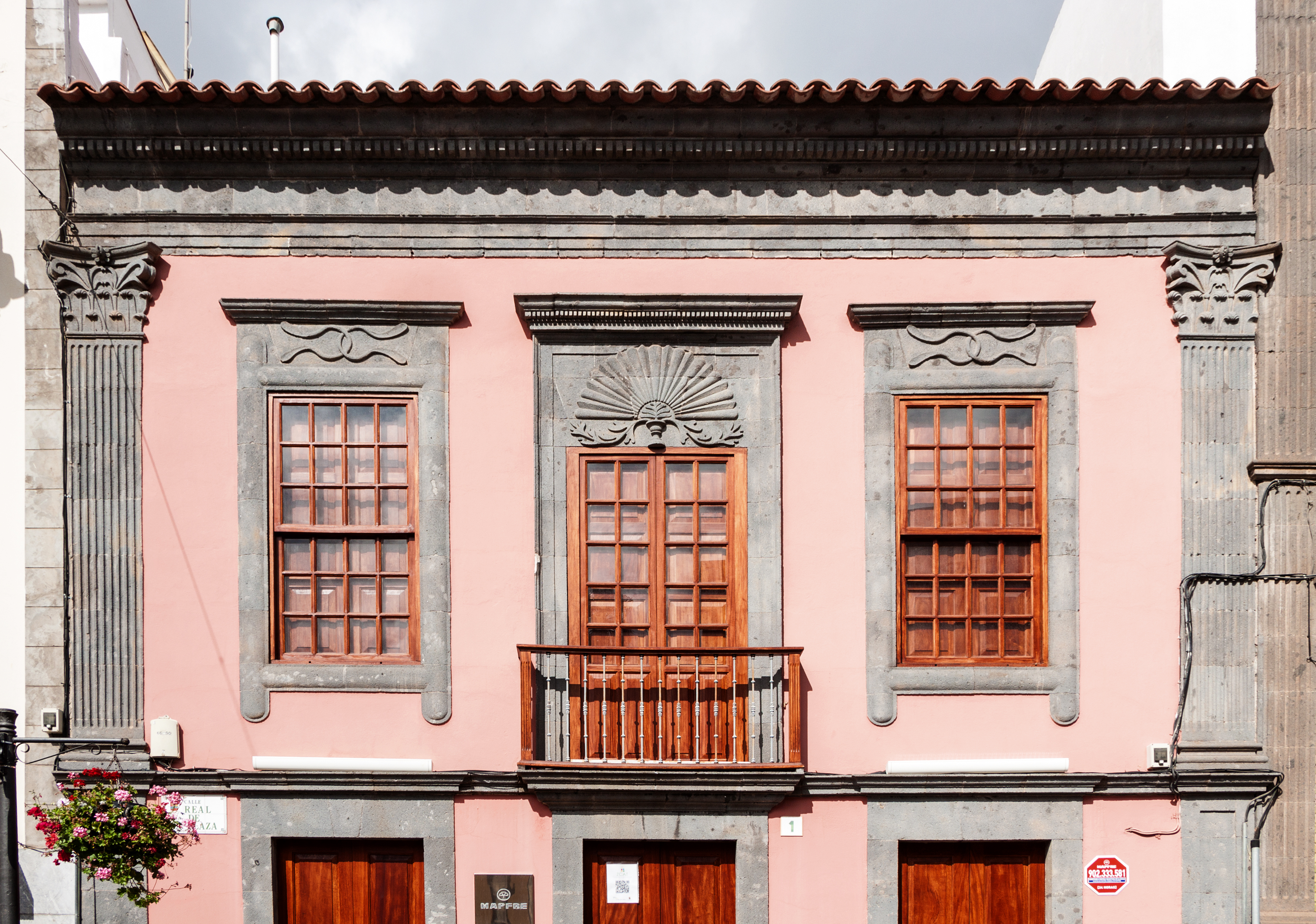
Facade, Calle Real de la Plaza

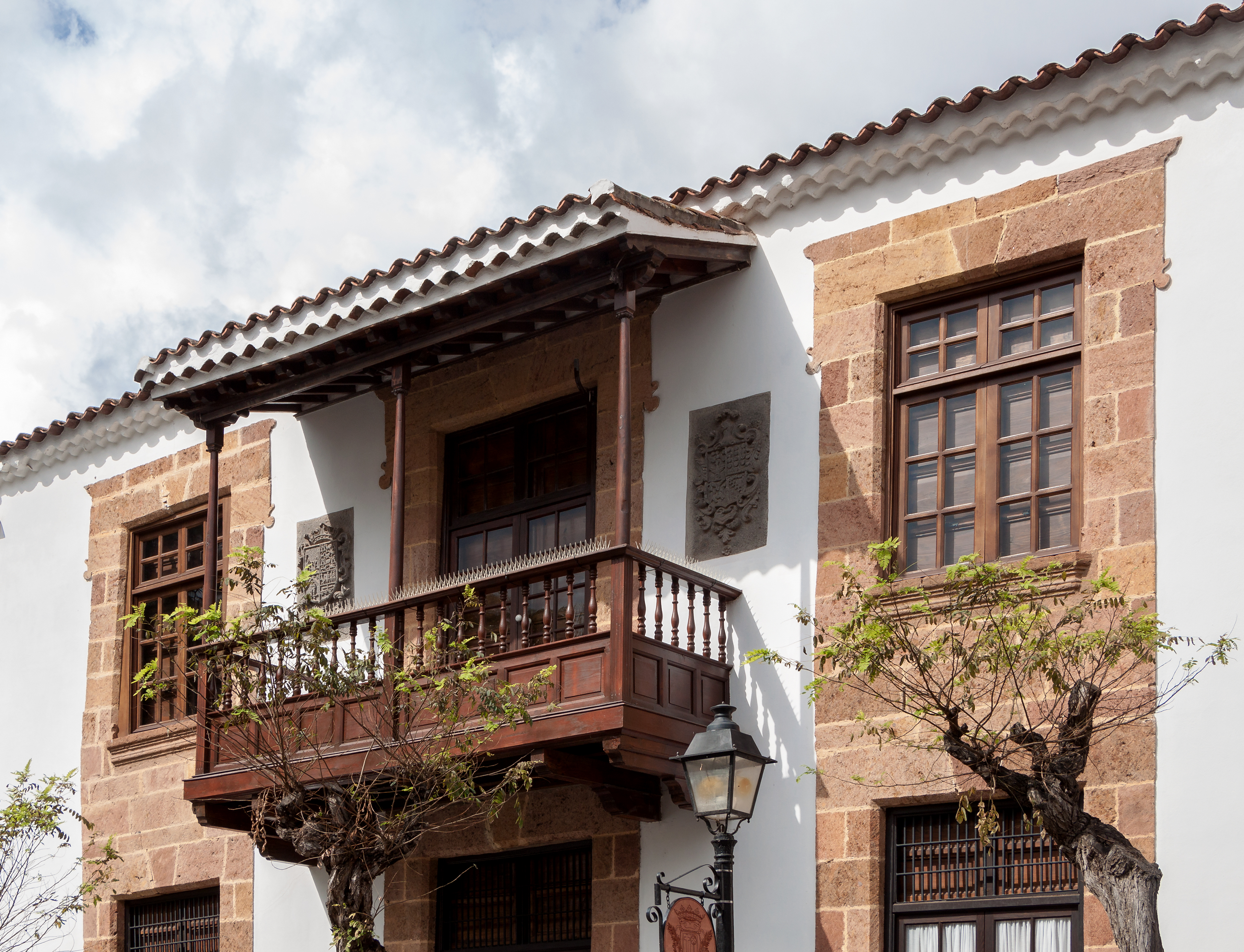
Facade, Calle Real de la Plaza

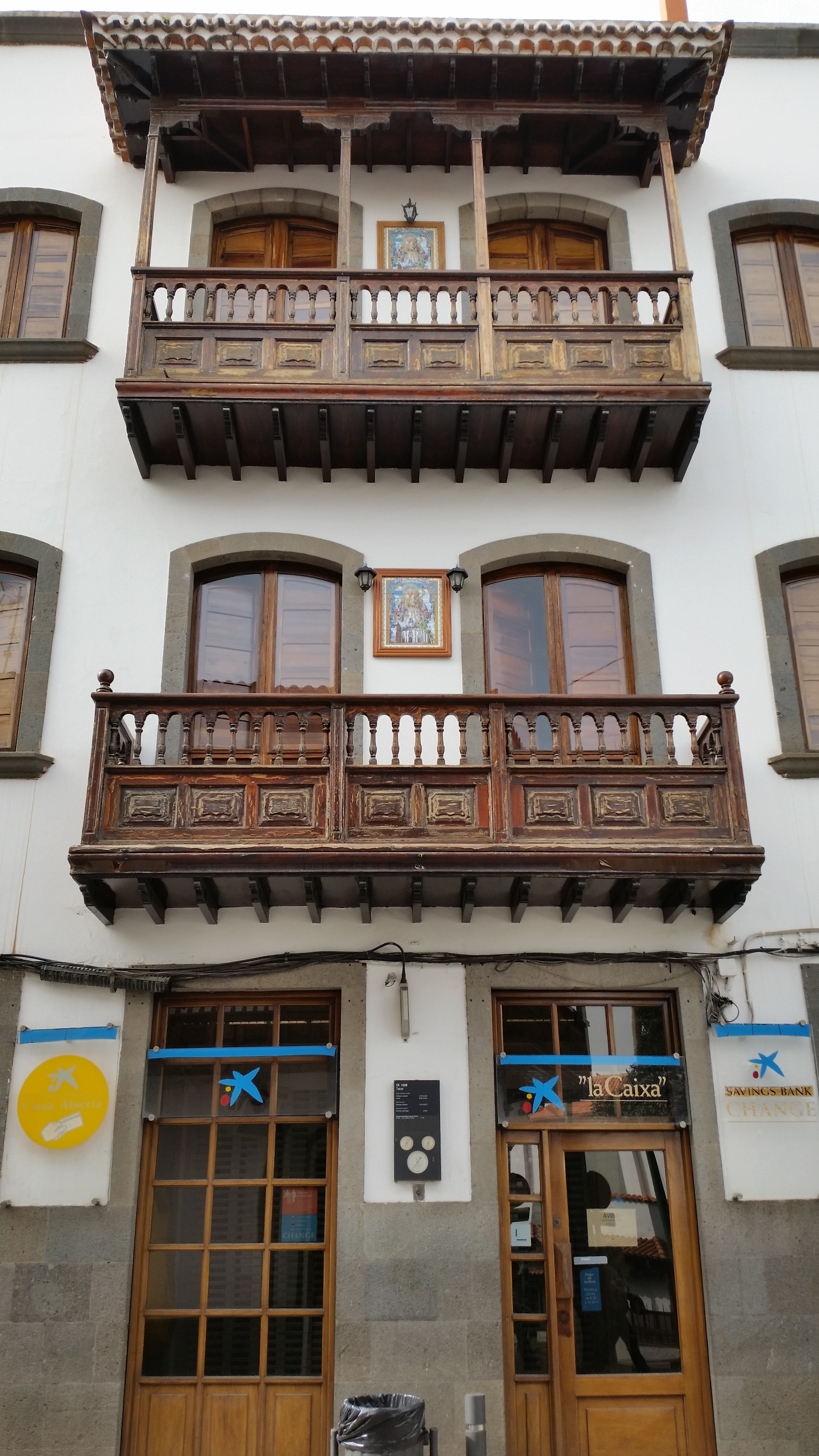
Balcony Calle Real de la Plaza 15

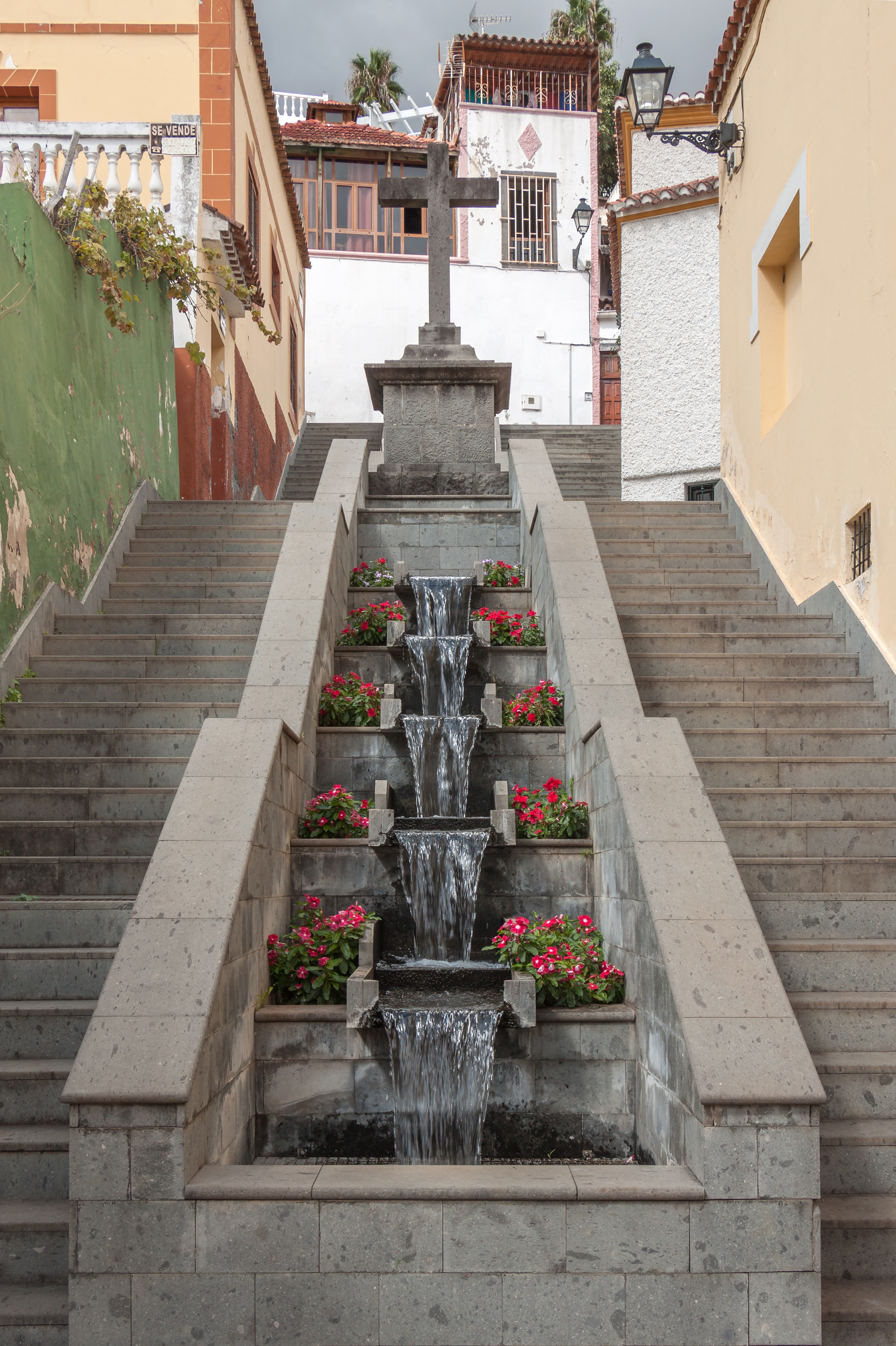
Water steps

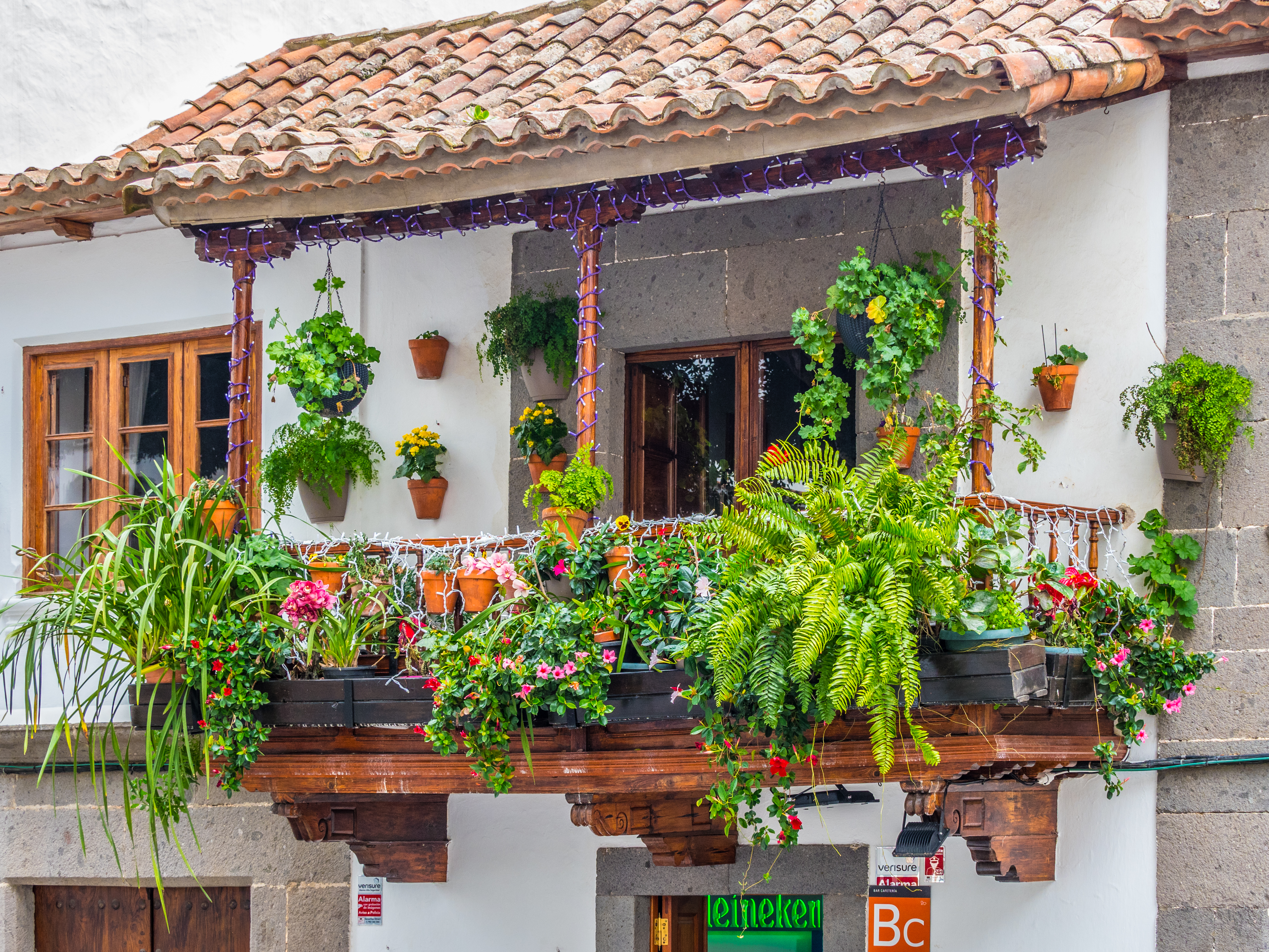
Typically Spanish Teror balcony

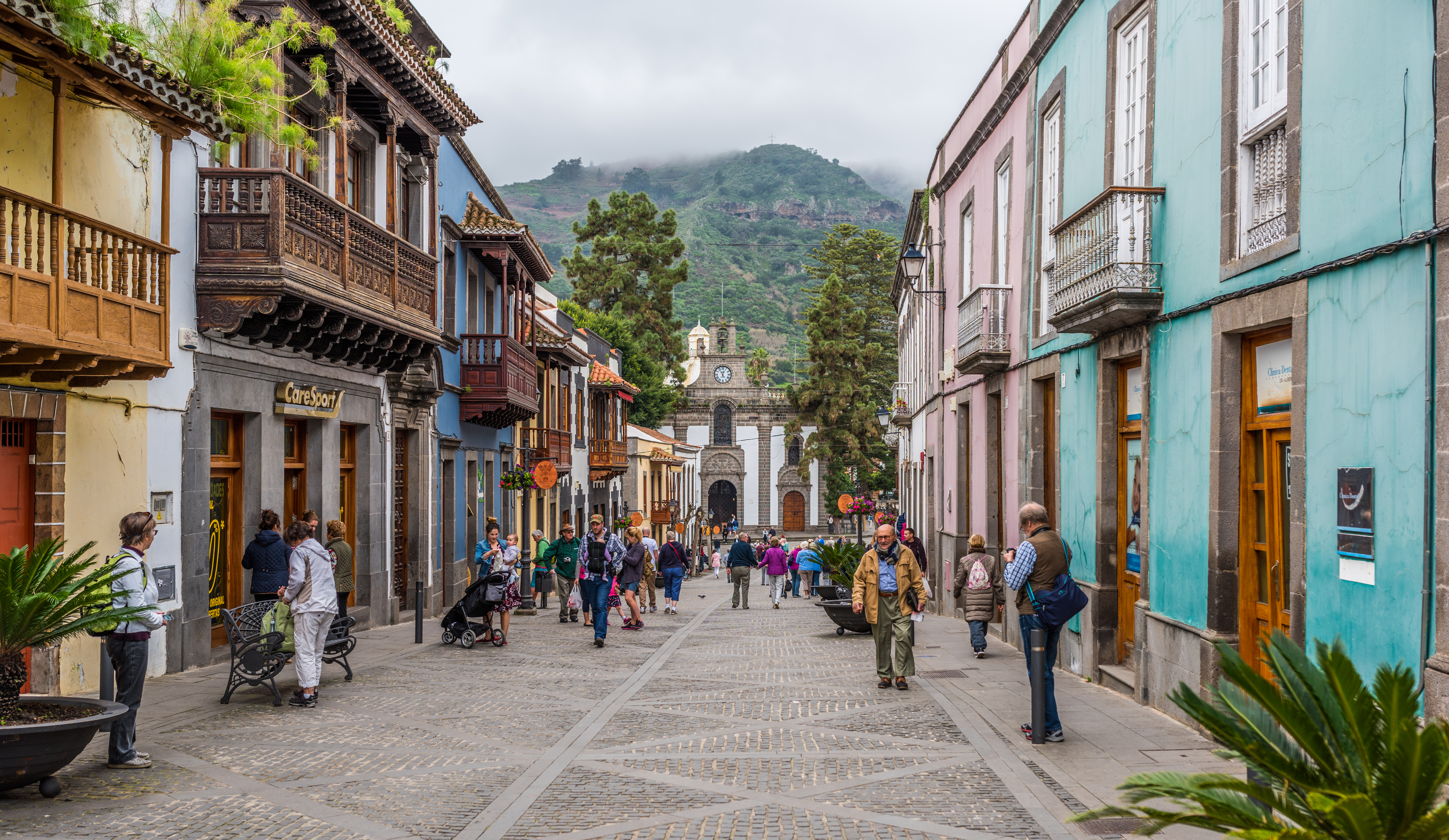
Main street to Basílica de Nuestra Señora del Pino

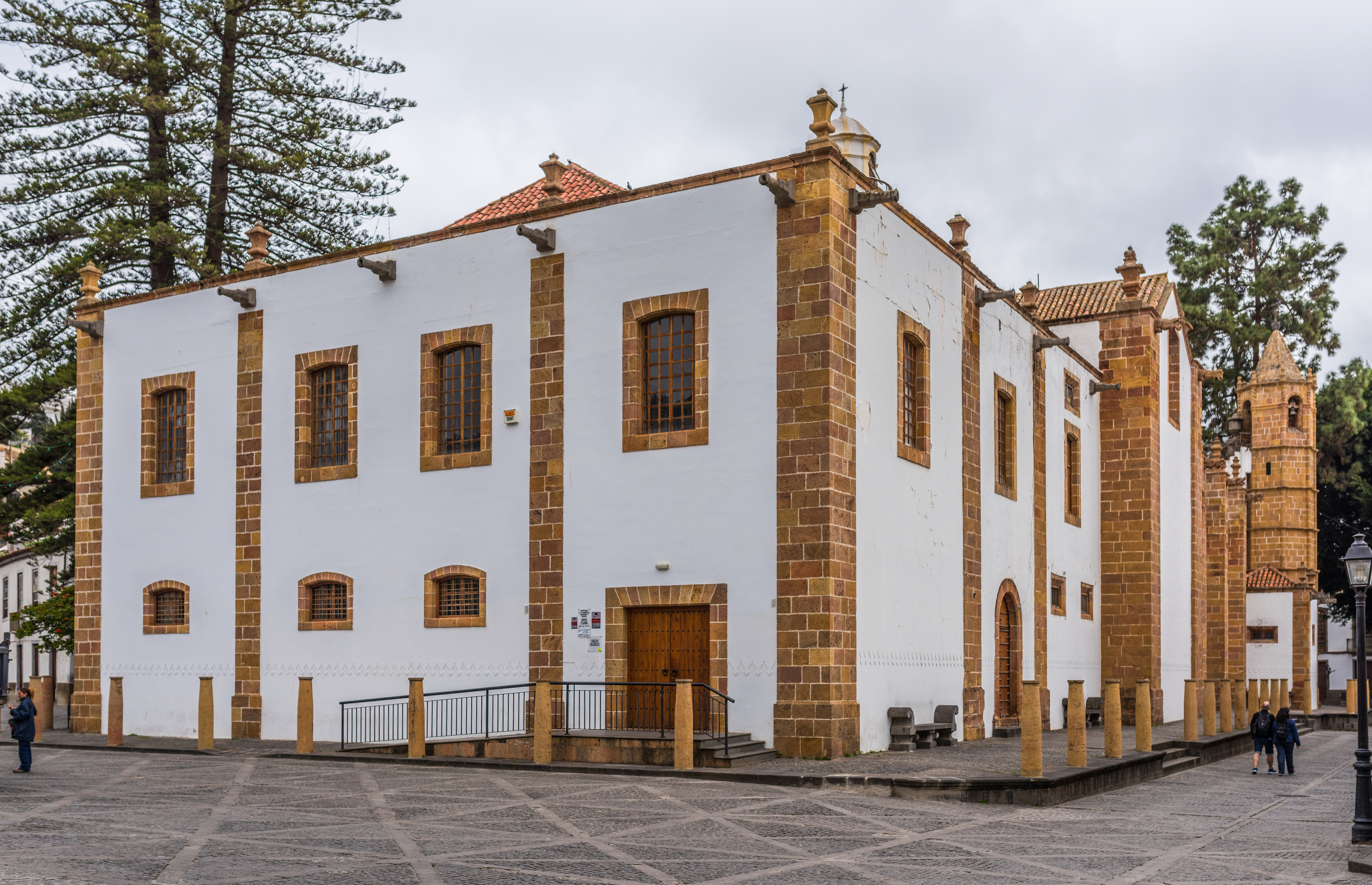
Backside of Basílica de Nuestra Señora del Pino

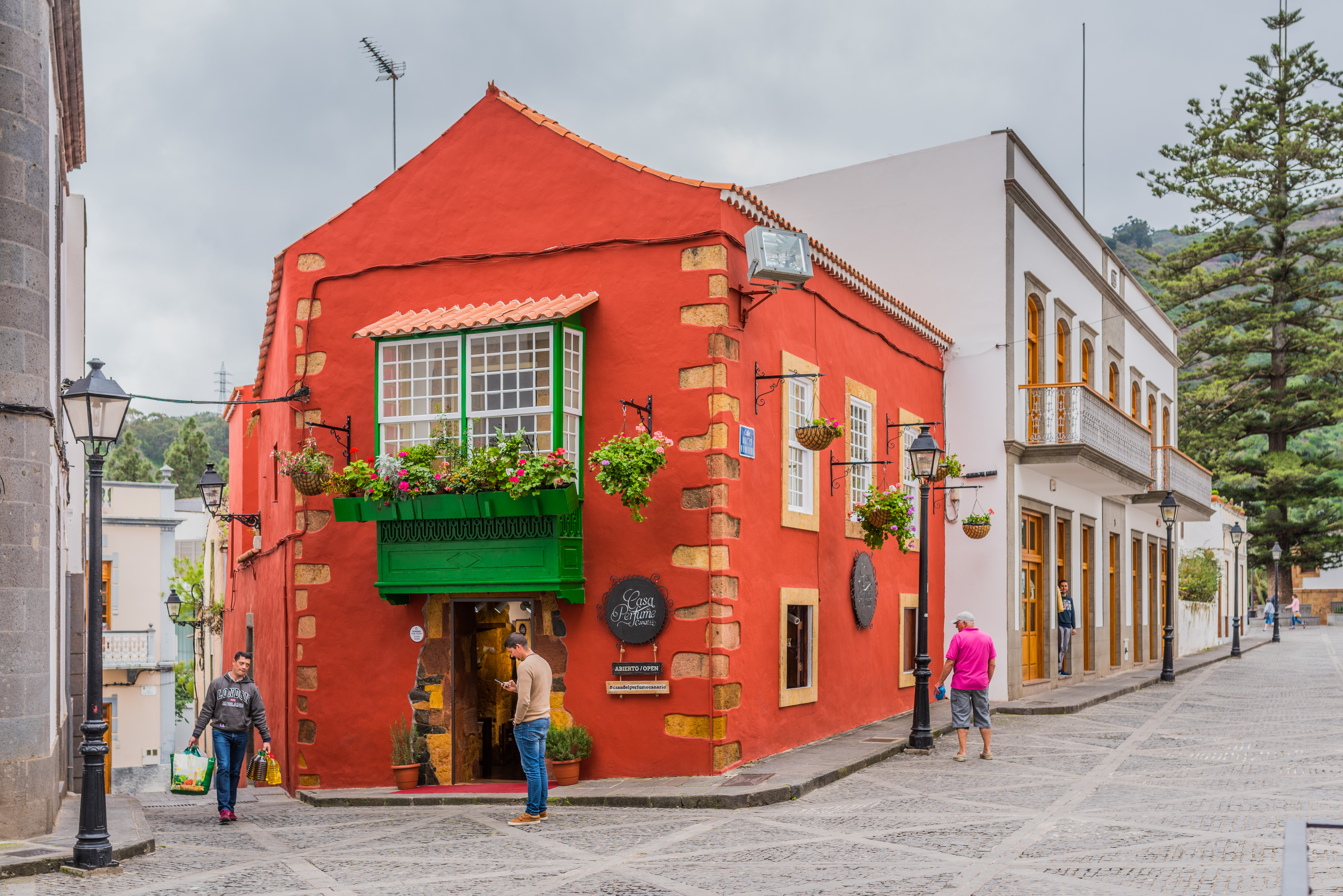
Conspicuous corner tavern with balcony

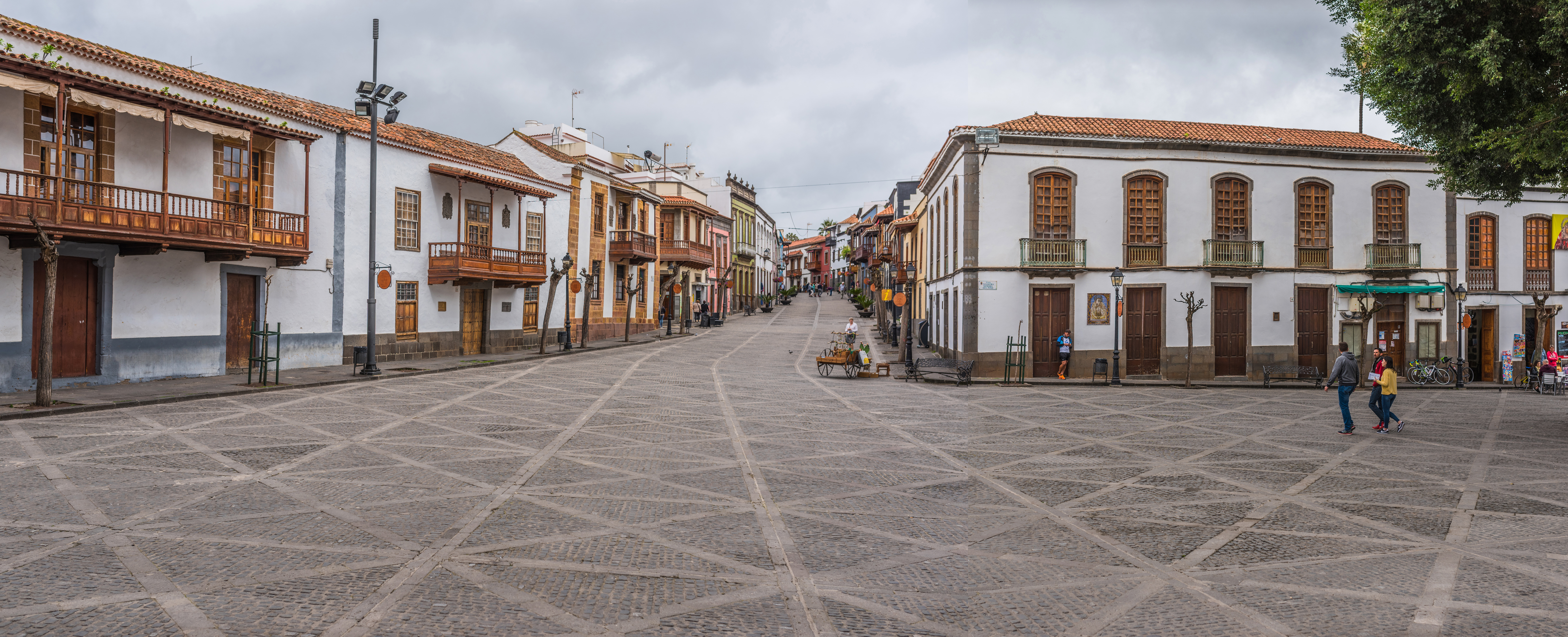
Town square in front of Basílica de Nuestra Señora del Pino

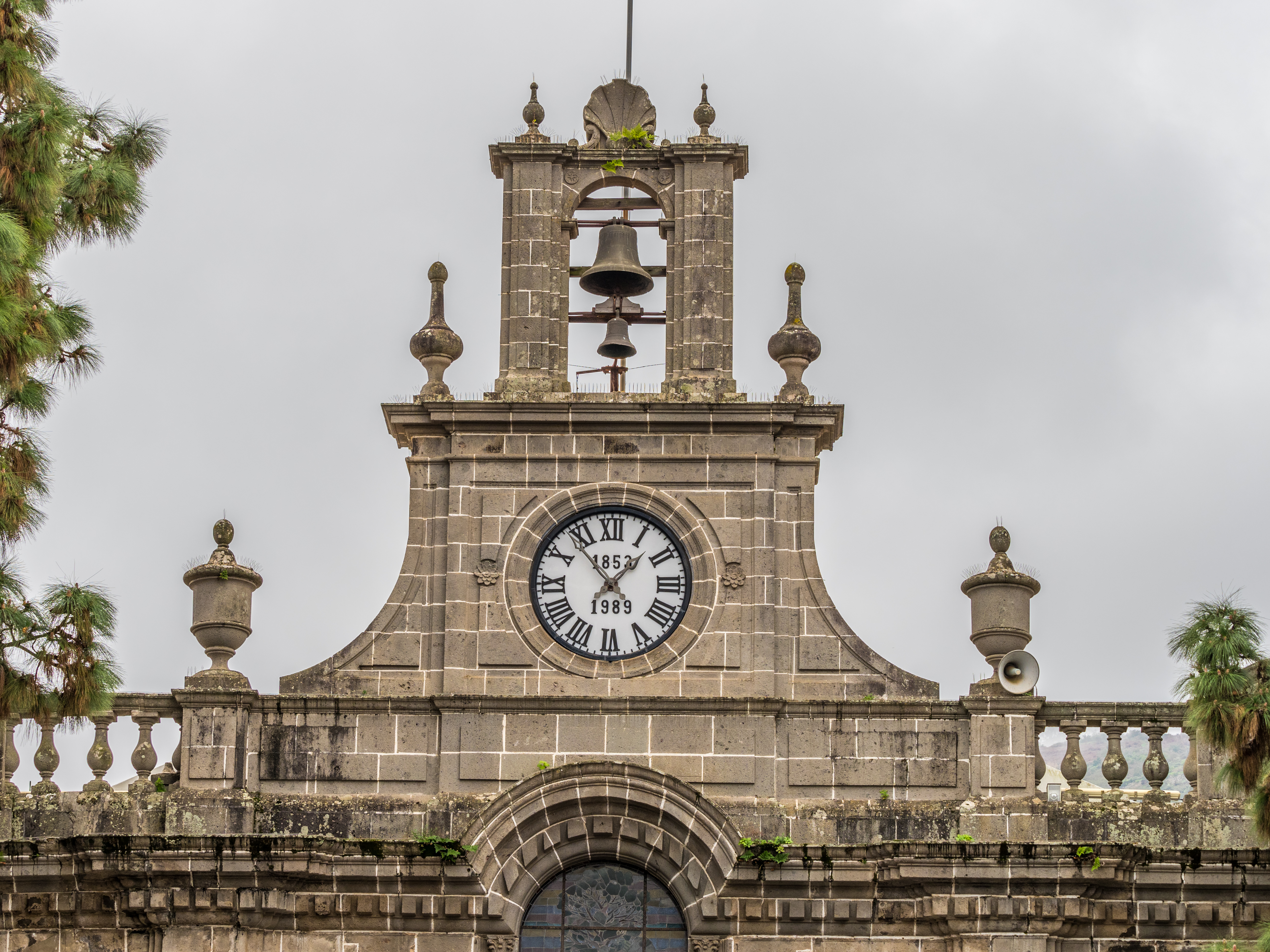
Top of Basilika "Nuestra Señora del Pino"

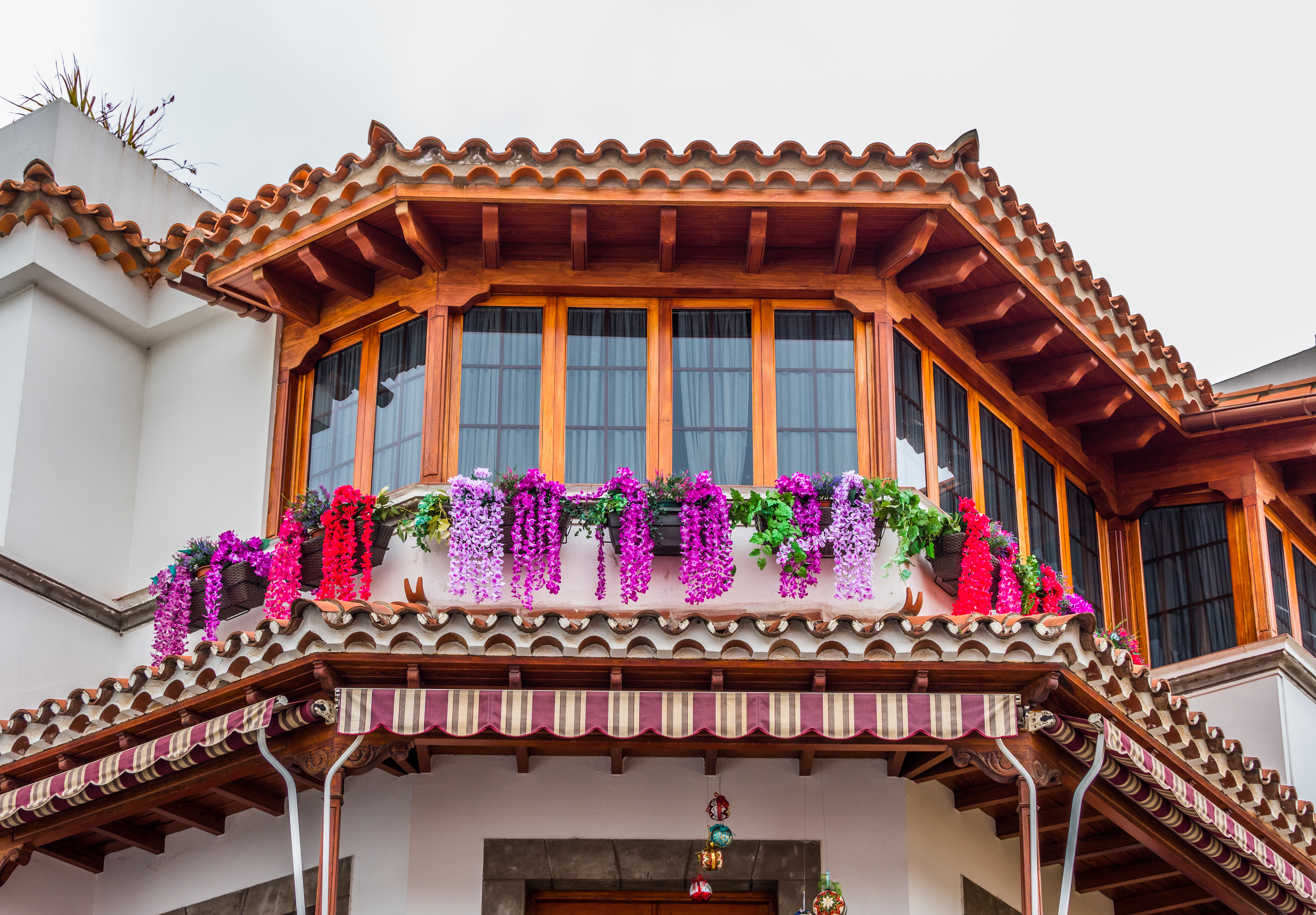
Facade with flower decor

== See also ==
- List of municipalities in Las Palmas
