= San Cipriano, Valle del Cauca =

San Cipriano
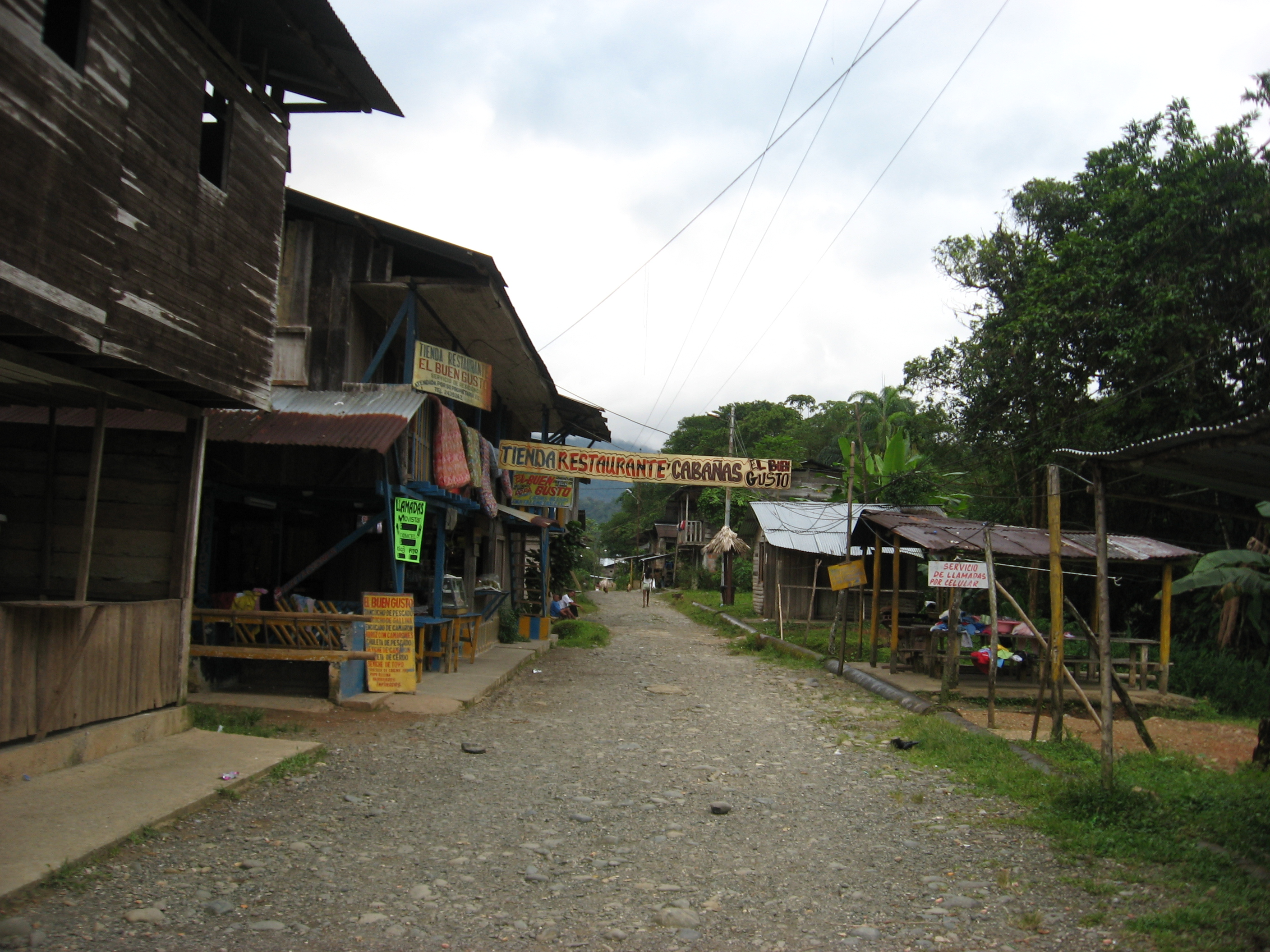
- San Cipriano village

- Location within Colombia
- Country: Colombia
- Department: Valle del Cauca

San Cipriano (Spanish pronunciation: [san siˈpɾjano]) is a populated center of Colombia located at 200 metres (660 ft) above sea level on the Pacific, around the Danubio River, nearby the port of Buenaventura, Valle del Cauca Department, Colombia.

== Overview ==
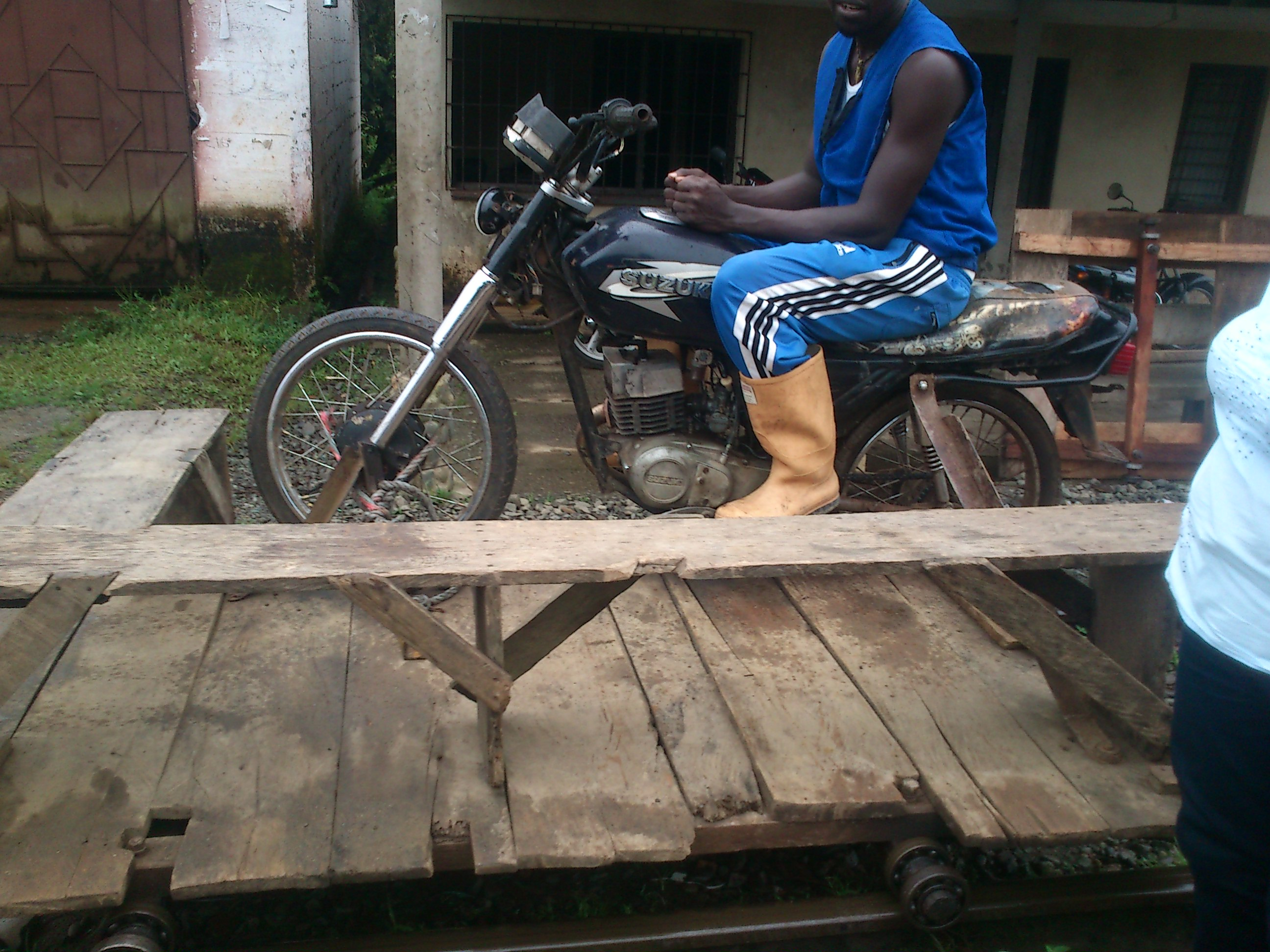
A brujita in San Cipriano

San Cipriano is known for its brujitas, small, flat, open train carts, usually made from wood and powered by motorbike, which use the abandoned railway and are the only way to get to the town. River tubing is also popular.

== Climate ==
San Cipriano has a tropical rainforest climate (Af) with heavy to very heavy rainfall year-round.

Climate data for San Cipriano
Month	Jan	Feb	Mar	Apr	May	Jun	Jul	Aug	Sep	Oct	Nov	Dec	Year
Mean daily maximum °C (°F)	30.1 (86.2)	30.6 (87.1)	30.6 (87.1)	30.6 (87.1)	30.4 (86.7)	30.4 (86.7)	30.4 (86.7)	30.3 (86.5)	30.2 (86.4)	29.6 (85.3)	29.5 (85.1)	29.8 (85.6)	30.2 (86.4)
Daily mean °C (°F)	25.8 (78.4)	26.3 (79.3)	26.4 (79.5)	26.4 (79.5)	26.3 (79.3)	26.1 (79.0)	26.2 (79.2)	26.1 (79.0)	25.9 (78.6)	25.6 (78.1)	25.6 (78.1)	25.7 (78.3)	26.0 (78.9)
Mean daily minimum °C (°F)	21.6 (70.9)	22.0 (71.6)	22.2 (72.0)	22.2 (72.0)	22.2 (72.0)	21.9 (71.4)	22.0 (71.6)	21.9 (71.4)	21.7 (71.1)	21.6 (70.9)	21.7 (71.1)	21.6 (70.9)	21.9 (71.4)
Average rainfall mm (inches)	351 (13.8)	229 (9.0)	325 (12.8)	412 (16.2)	565 (22.2)	420 (16.5)	444 (17.5)	485 (19.1)	613 (24.1)	661 (26.0)	613 (24.1)	425 (16.7)	5,543 (218)
