= Villafranca de Estíbaliz =

Hamlet in Álava, Spain

Villafranca
- Concejo
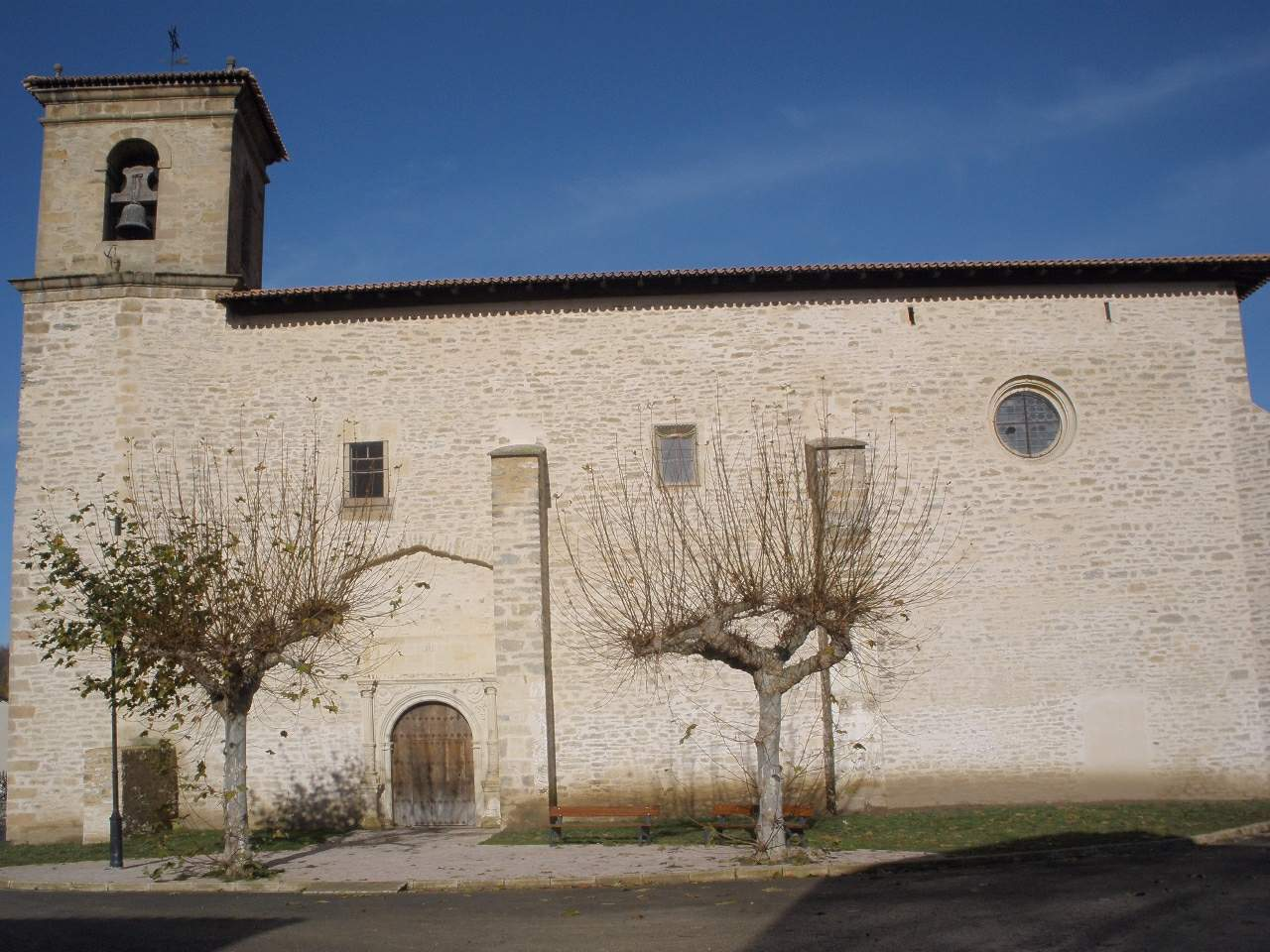
- The church of Villafranca

- Location within Álava Location within the Basque Country Location within Spain
- Coordinates: 42°48′N 2°36′W
- Country: Spain
- Autonomous community: Basque Country
- Province: Álava
- Comarca: Vitoria-Gasteiz
- Municipality: Vitoria-Gasteiz

Area
  - Total: 1.04 km^{2} (0.40 sq mi)
- Elevation: 559 m (1,834 ft)

Population (2023)
  - Total: 158
  - Density: 152/km^{2} (393/sq mi)
- Postal code: 01193

Villafranca (Basque: Billafranka, formerly in Spanish: Villafranca de Estíbaliz) is a hamlet and concejo in the municipality of Vitoria-Gasteiz, in Álava province, Basque Country, Spain.
