= Virgen del Pino =

Statue in Teror, Spain

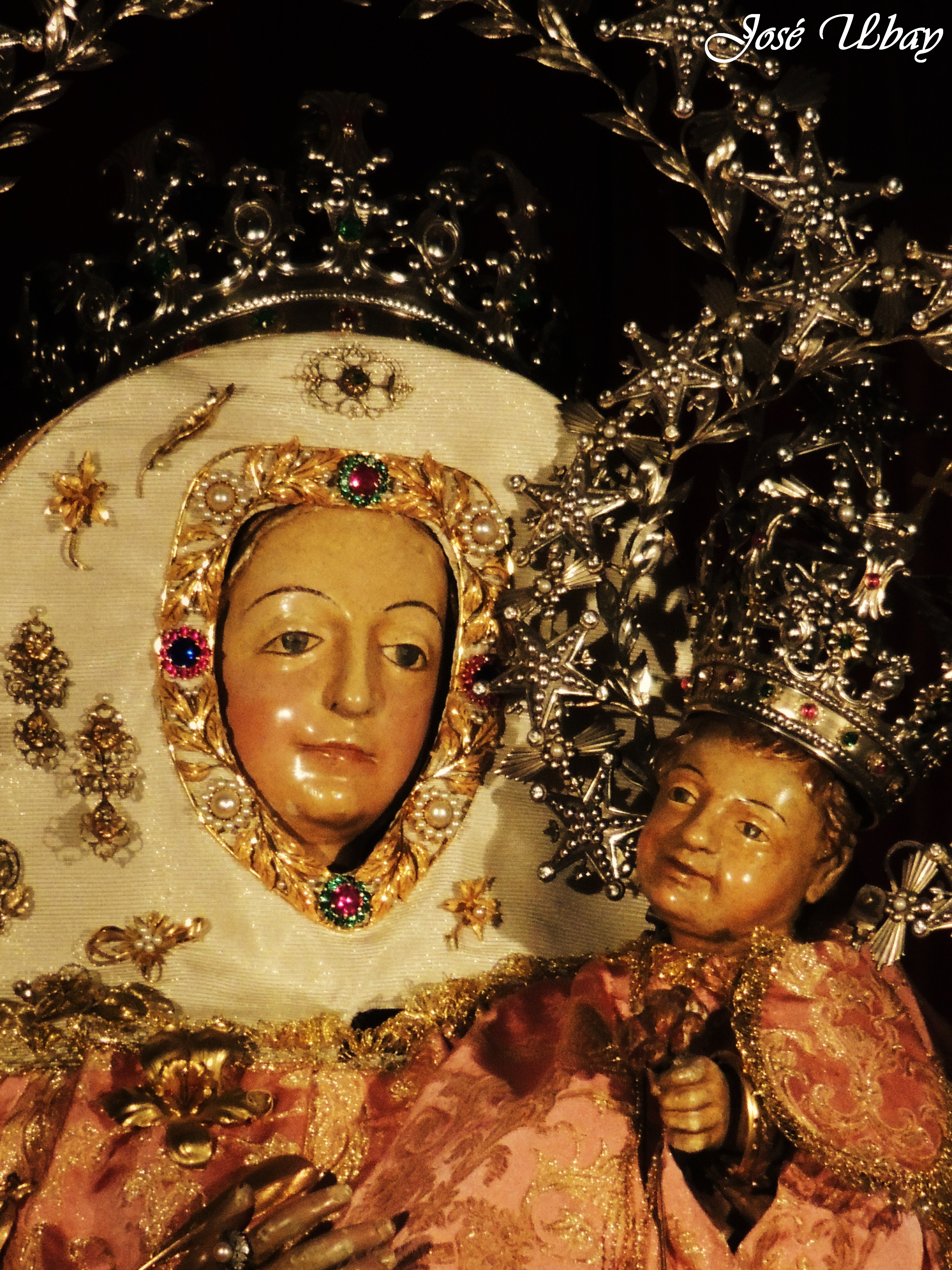
Virgen del Pino

The Virgen del Pino (or "Virgin of the Pine") is a Marian dedication venerated in Teror, Spain. The virgin was declared patroness of the Gran Canaria.

The story of Nuestra Señora del Pino (Our Lady of the Pine) is as follows. At the site of the present-day Basilica, the image of the virgin herself is said to have appeared in a pine tree on 8 September 1492 to the first Bishop of Gran Canaria, Juan Frías. Said to possess healing qualities, Nuestra Señora del Pino has become the patron saint of the island. On the steps outside the Basilica it is possible to buy wax models of every part of the human body that can be offered for healing. The figure itself is extraordinary. It is said that one side of the face is smiling and the other side is sad. The figure is bedecked with jewels, although not as many as there were before the robbery in 1975.
