= Church of San Cipriano, Toledo =

Church in Toledo, Castilla-La Mancha, Spain

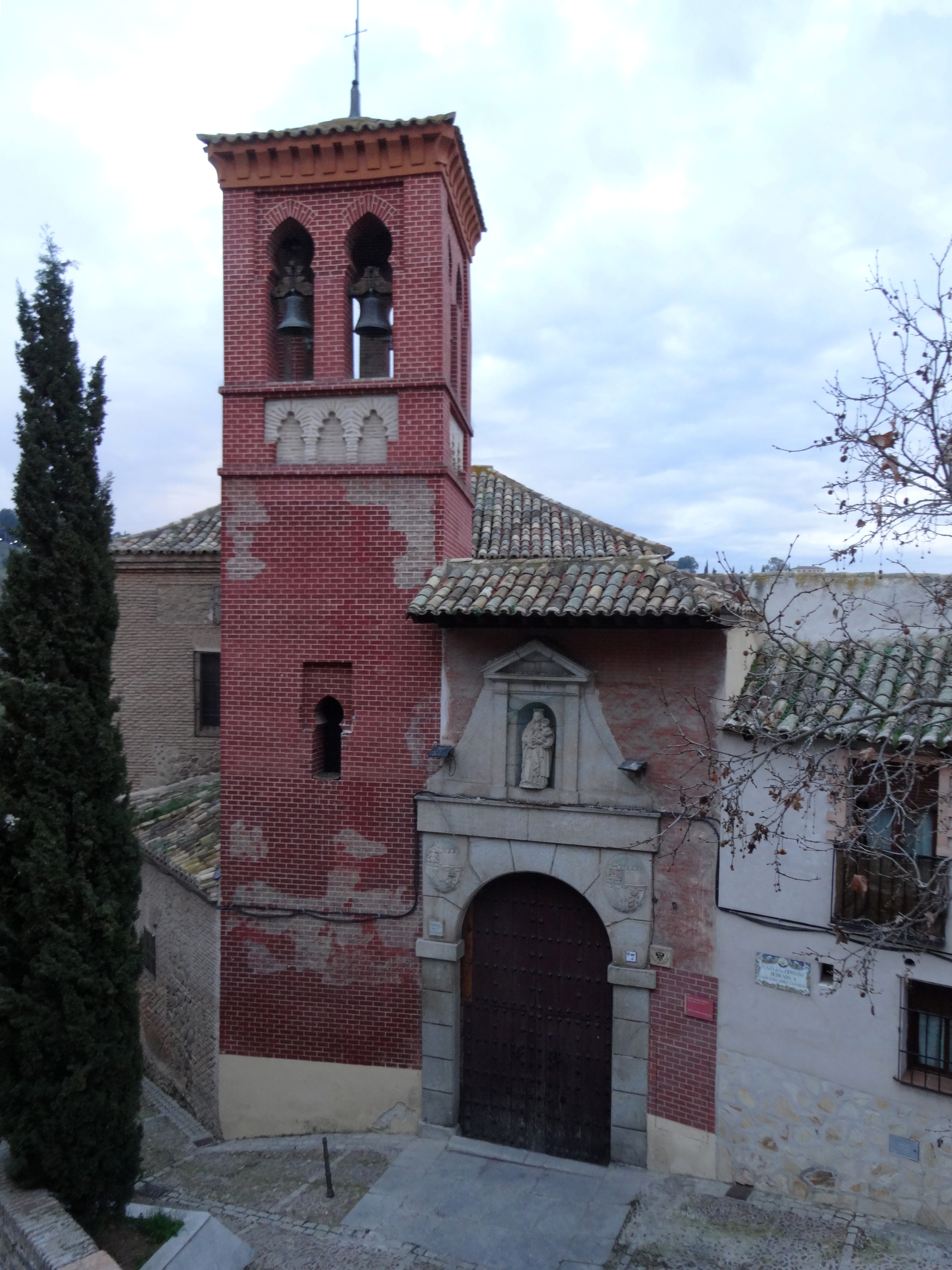
San Cipriano, Toledo

The Church of San Cipriano is a church located in Toledo, Castilla-La Mancha, Spain. The medieval building was rebuilt in the 17th century apart from the tower.

== History ==
In 1125 (40 years after the Reconquista) it was cited as a parish following the Latin Rite (rather than the Mozarabic one). It is thought that the building could have originally been a mosque, based upon its layout and a preceding courtyard, which was later used as a cemetery.

One of the first churches in Toledo, it retains a tower of Umayyad architecture. It has a square base and a masonry body a pointed round arch on each side of the tower, framed with a Moorish panel, and brickwork for the corners and rows. When the church was rebuilt the free-standing tower was incorporated in the building.

Between 1612 and 1613, the church was rebuilt by Juan Bautista Monegro, based upon the design by Juan de Orduña and at the expense of Don Carlos Venero y Leyba, canon of Toledo. The original building, in bad disrepair, was razed, except for the medieval tower, which was not attached to the church building. The new building is larger, with a longer main chapel, the addition of two sacristy rooms. The city gave Don Carlos Venero an alley that was attached to the main chapel. Two chapels were opened at the beginning of the nave. The one on the side of the epistle has a private sacristy. In 1662, a room dedicated to Virgin of Hope of Macarena was built off the main chapel. It had retablos, ornaments and rent for its chaplains.
