= Roque Bentayga =

- Rock Bentayga, Bentaiga
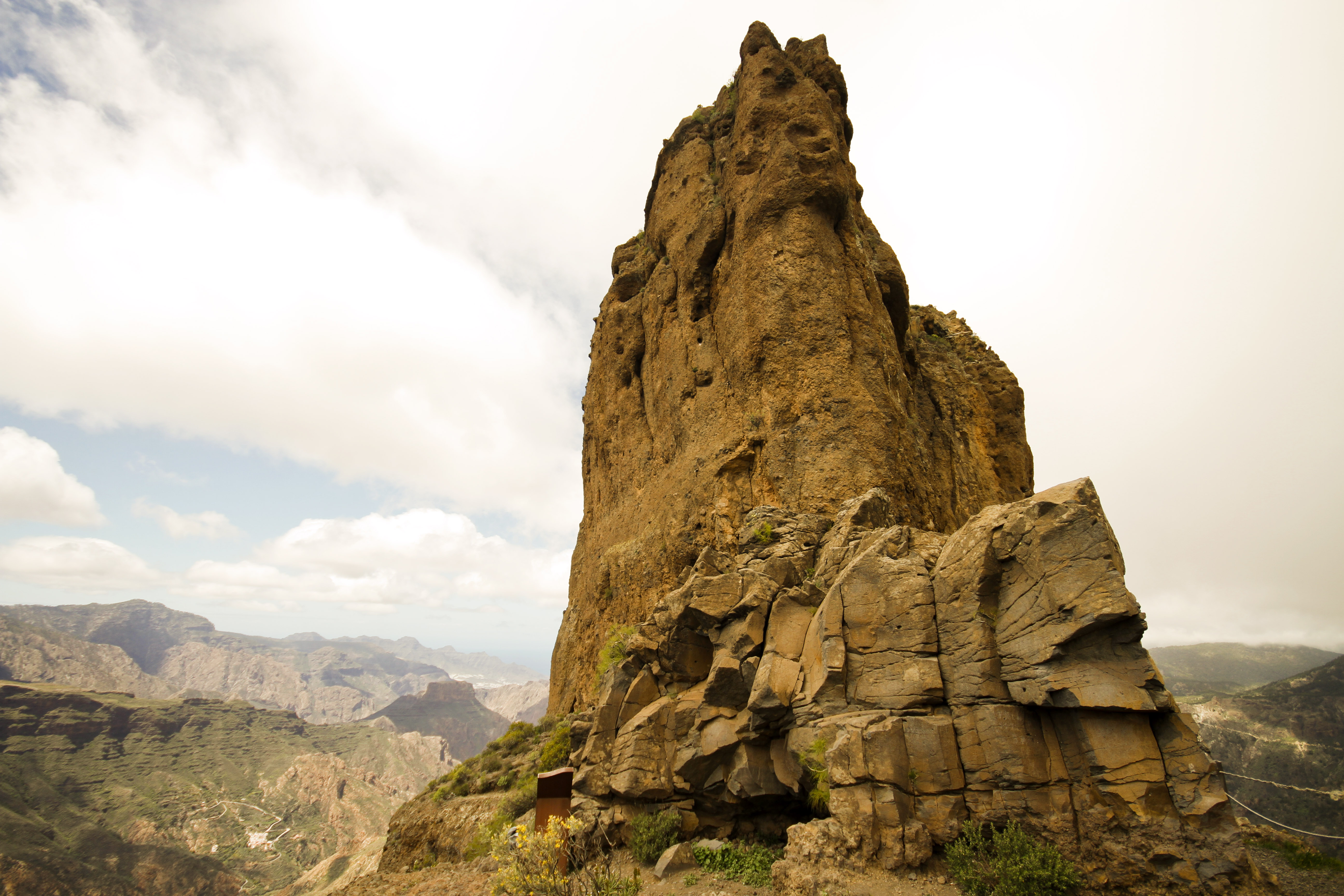
- View of Roque Bentayga

Highest point
- Elevation: 1,414 m (4,639 ft)
- Coordinates: 27°59′28.8888″N 15°38′28.9032″W

Naming
- Native name: Bentayga (Guanche)
- English translation: "Place that supports"

Geography
- Location within Canary Islands
- Location: Tejeda, Gran Canaria, Canary Islands, Spain

Geology
- Mountain type: Volcanic plug

Roque Bentayga is a rock formation on the island of Gran Canaria (Canary Islands, Spain). It is located within the volcanic caldera of Tejeda, in the municipality of the same name, in the heart of the island. Roque Bentayga is considered an archaeological monument because it contains an "almogarén" (a sanctuary built by the indigenous Guanche people).

== Characteristics ==
Roque Bentayga is a natural rock pinnacle. Its height is 1,414 metres (4,639 ft) above sea level. The Roque is located within the Nublo Rural Park.

== Archaeology ==
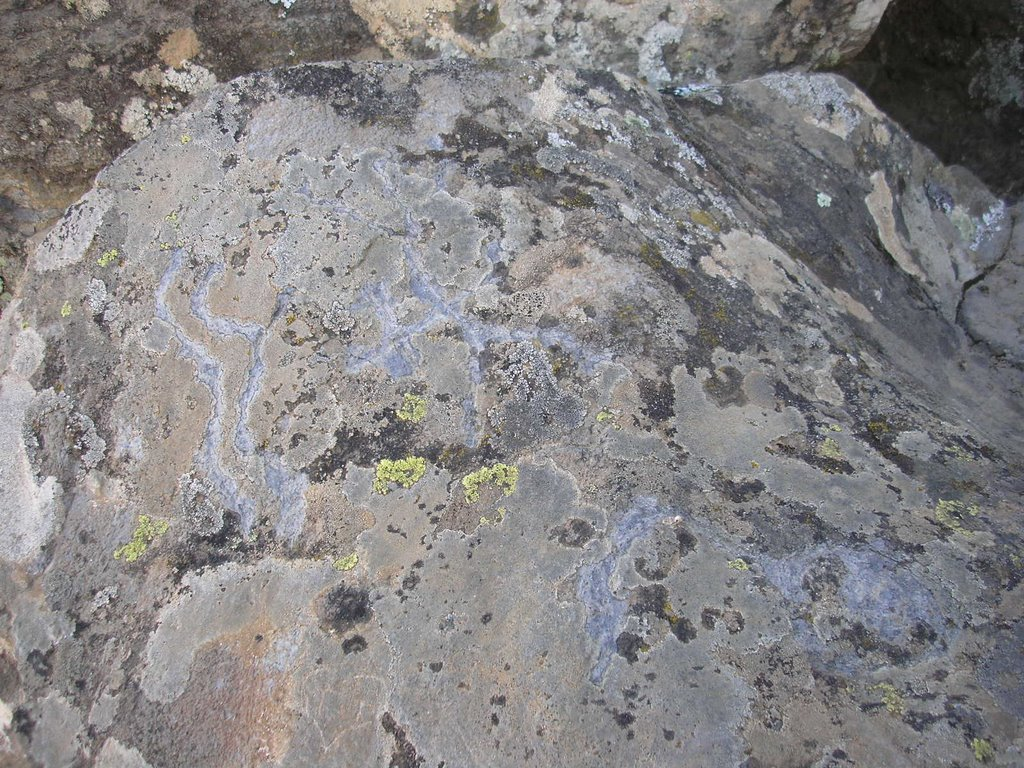
Petroglyphs on Bentayga.

Near Roque Bentayga are the old Canarian aboriginal settlements of Cuevas del Rey and Roque Camello, which consist of a hundred caves with rooms, burials, silos, etc. On the eastern side of the base of the roque is the so-called "almogarén del Bentayga", a construction that must have been a place of worship for the aborigines. A stone wall that runs along the base of the rock on its east and south sides could delimit the sacred space, although other sources point to its use as a defensive bastion.

Several cave engravings in the Libyan-Berber alphabet have recently been unveiled, although their authenticity is questioned.

== Toponymy ==
The origin of the name "Bentayga" has been widely debated, mainly due to contradictory information collected during the conquest, as well as irregularities in the way of writing and referring to it, even about the roots that form the word.

One hypothesis is that the voice Bentaiga is composed of two elements: ben-(t)aiga, the first being a prefix with the notion of property or belonging, and the second to the toponym Taiga, from Gran Canaria and Lanzarote, and indirectly with Tigaiga, from Tenerife. Bentaiga would therefore literally mean 'the taiga' or 'place of taiga'. However, the origin of the voice 'taiga' is uncertain.

Another interpretation of the term Bentaiga suggests a compound of the Numidian word bent meaning 'mountain' and the Mycenaean word aiga (metathesis of agia) meaning 'sacred', thus 'sacred mountain'.

The most extended interpretation is the one that sustains that, suggested by the word 'ben-' ('place of'), it means 'place that holds', or 'place that keeps in place', aligning itself with the cosmological and religious ideas of the Guanches, who believed that the place was an axis mundi.

== Gallery ==
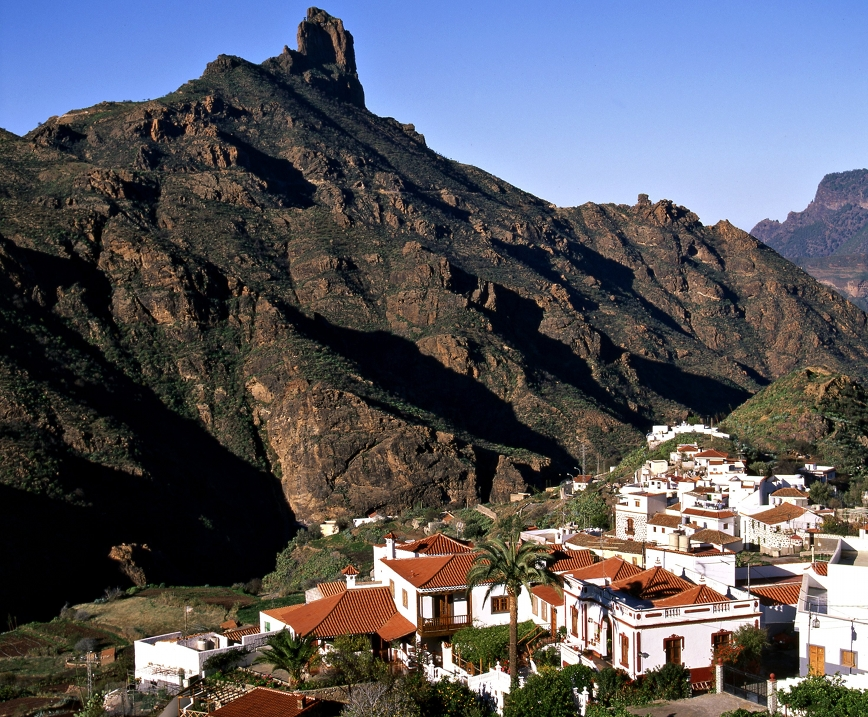
Roque Bentayga from Tejeda

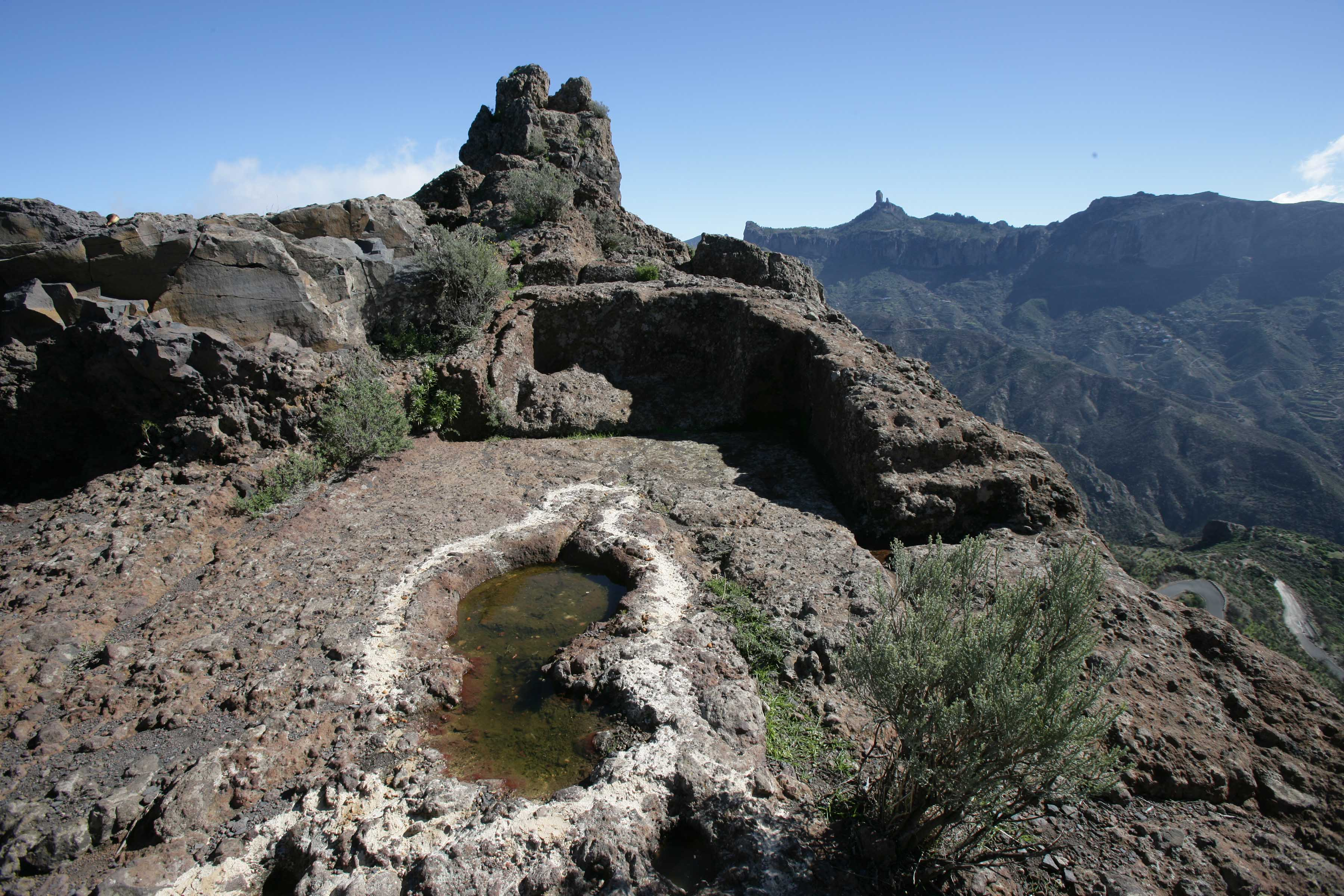
Meeting place of the former inhabitants of Tejeda.

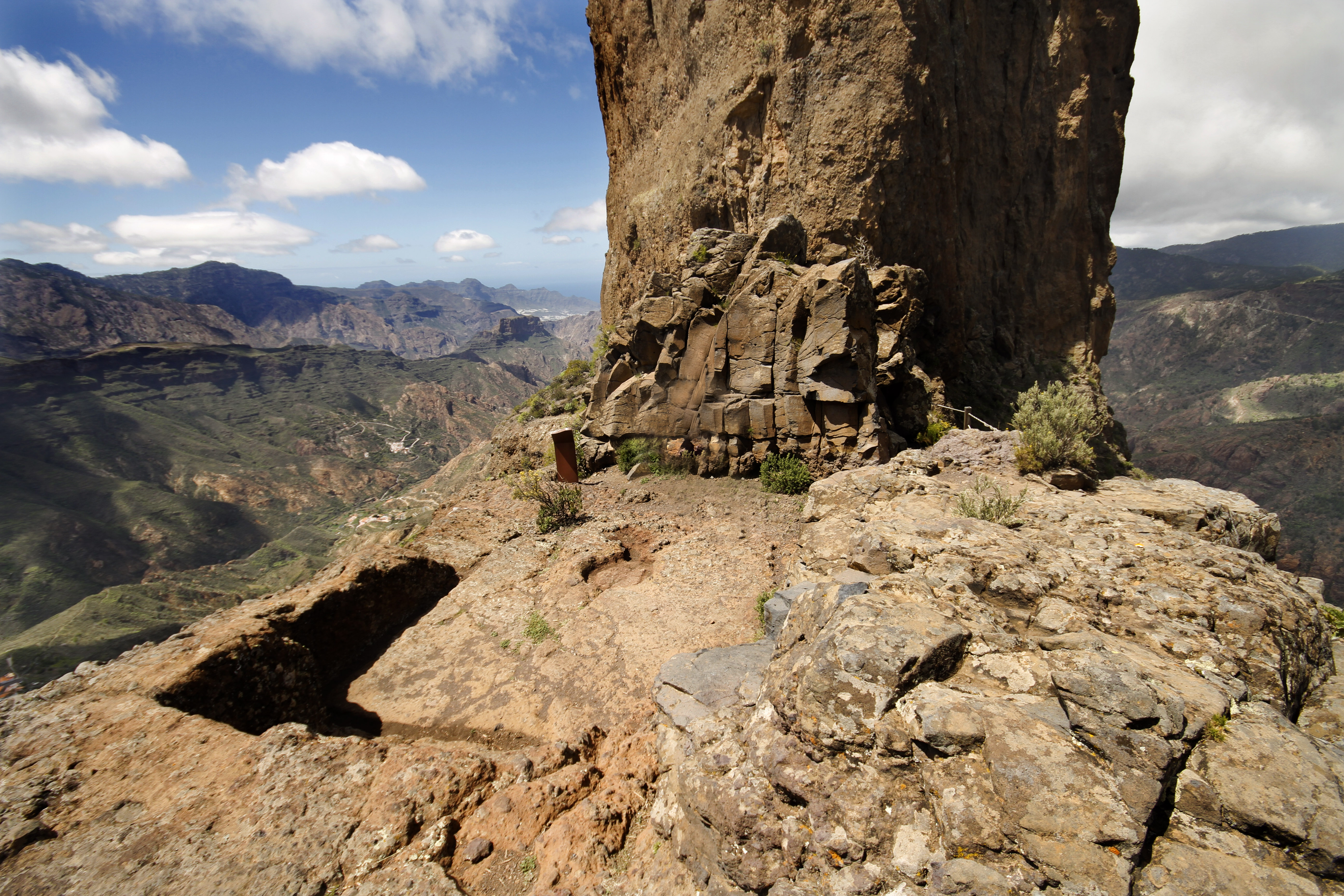
Roque Bentayga's 'almogarén' (place of cult)

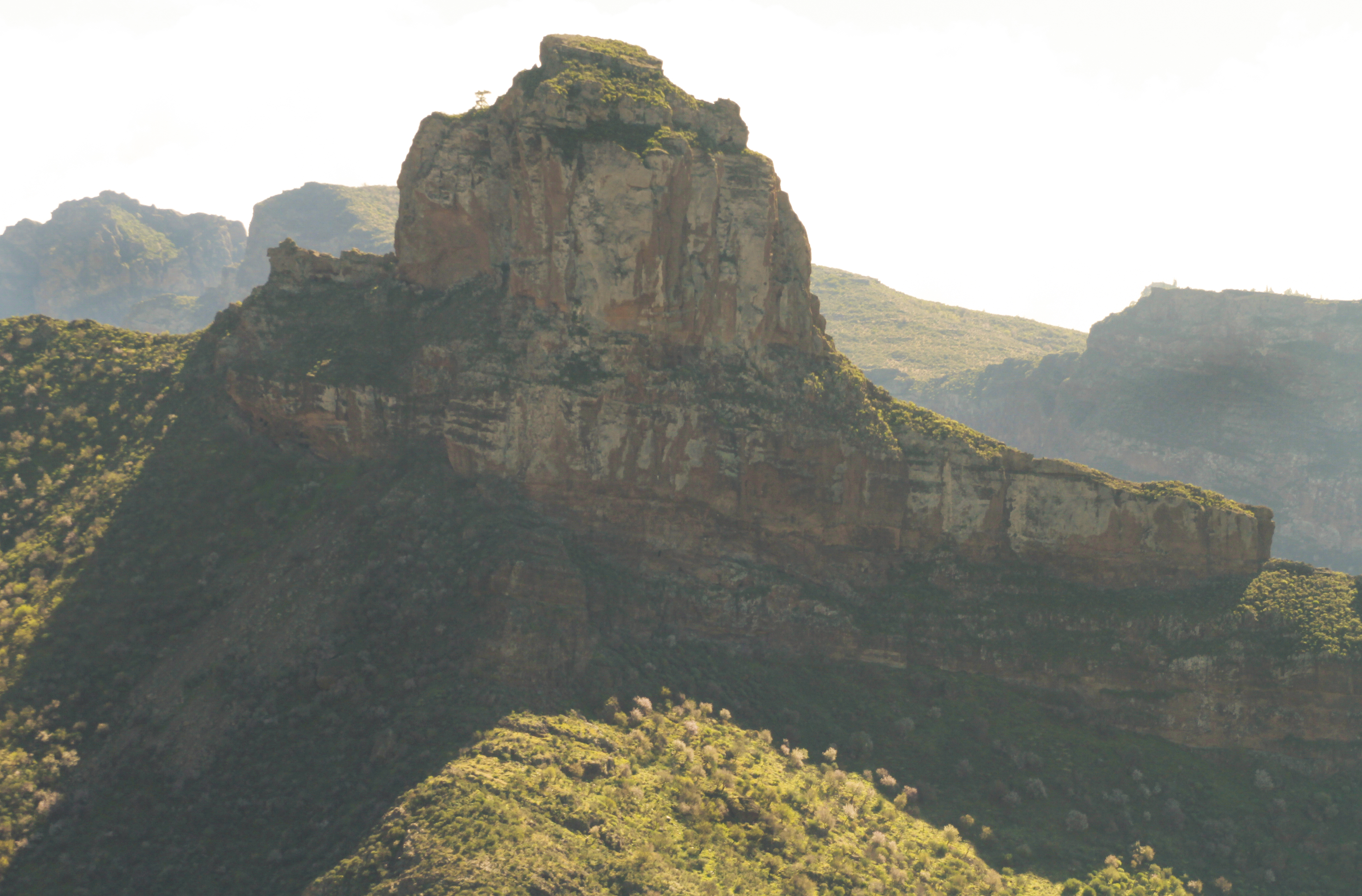
Bentayga as seen from Artenara.

== See also ==
- Parque rural del Nublo
- Roque Nublo
- Tejeda
- Gran Canaria
- Canary Islands
- Guanches
