= Pico de las Nieves =

Mountain on the Canary Islands

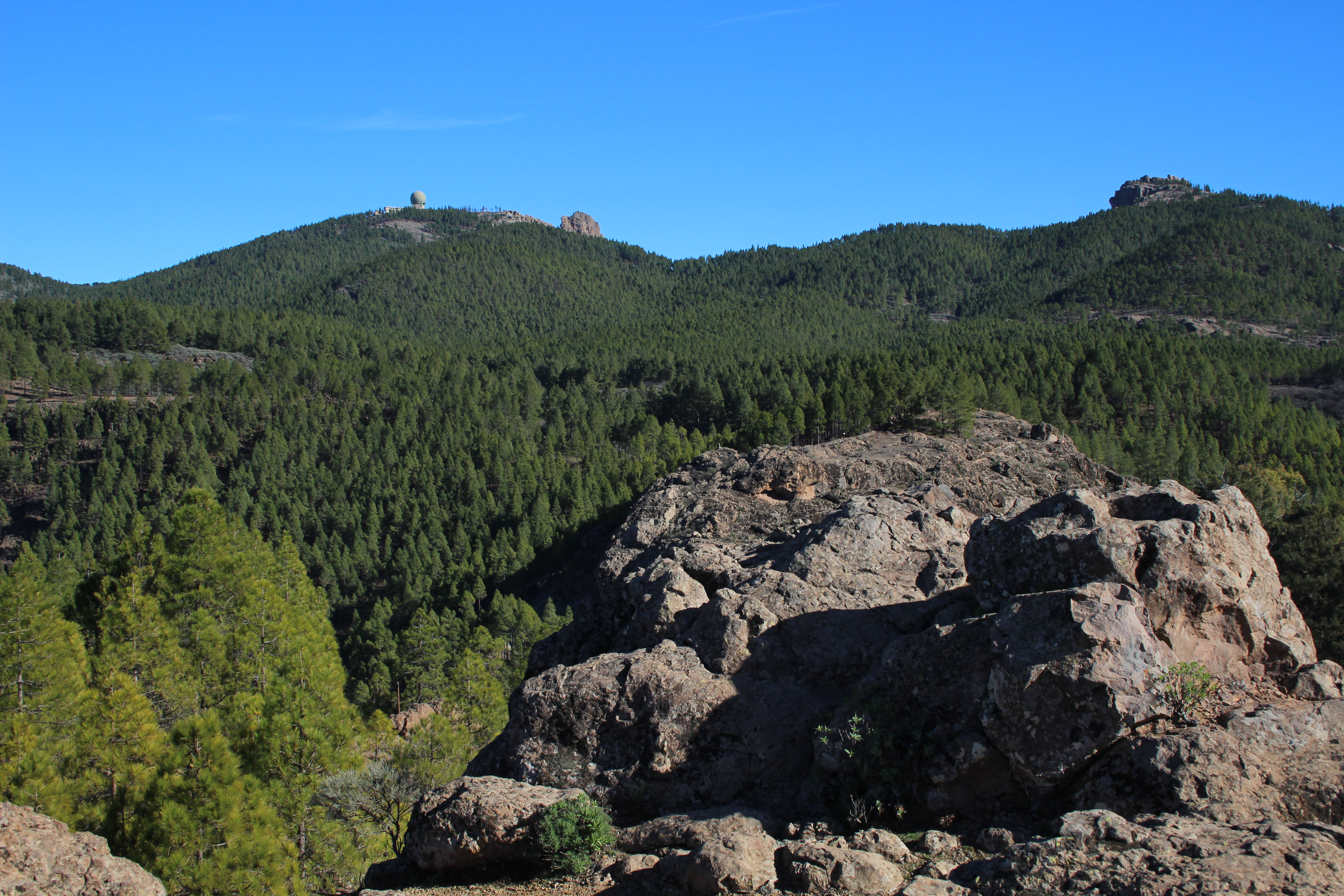

Highest point
- Elevation: 1,949 m (6,394 ft)
- Prominence: 1,949 m (6,394 ft)
- Listing: Ultra
- Coordinates: 27°57′43″N 15°34′18″W

Geography
- Location within Canary Islands
- Location: Gran Canaria, Canary Islands, Spain

Geology
- Mountain type: Stratovolcano

Pico de las Nieves is the highest peak and a stratovolcano on the island of Gran Canaria, Canary Islands, Spain. Its height is 1,949 metres (6,394 ft) above sea level. On its slopes, Canary Islands Pine was reintroduced in the 1950s.

Traditionally, Pico de las Nieves has been considered the highest peak on the island of Gran Canaria; however, this is uncertain since Morro de la Agujereada stands at 1,956 metres (6,417 ft), which would make it higher than Pico de las Nieves. The two mountains stand next to each other.

Gran Canaria has the highest elevation of the province of Las Palmas and the third highest in the Canary Islands. Of the other Canary Islands, only Tenerife and La Palma have higher peaks.

== Name ==
The name means 'peak of the snows' in Spanish and refers to the fact that several covered pits (neveras in Spanish) for holding snow were built directly into the mountainsides. (An alternative theory states that the name came about as the mountain had the highest frequency of snowfalls on the island.) The first of the neveras was constructed in 1694 by order of the Catholic Church. The snow was collected by laborers using wooden shovels and wicker baskets, making real mountains of snow. The snow was placed into the pits by the "paleros" in rows, and packed in rectangular boxes of wood or cork separated by layers of straw.

There were many blocks of ice, called "sabanada", which in June would be carried in panniers of straw covered with blankets to the ice cream shop in the Cathedral of Las Palmas (the capital of the island) on horseback, which took five or six hours. The snow was used for alleviating disease, to lower the temperature in the epidemics of yellow fever and cholera, as well as an anti-inflammatory and analgesic. It was also used for cooling water or beverages for the upper class. Water from the pools was used for irrigation purposes.

== Sights ==
Most of the highest plateau is occupied by a military base, including a large ball-shaped radar. Civilian visitors are allowed to enter a platform somewhat below the base, from which half of the island as well as Tenerife's Pico del Teide is visible, in case of good weather. The most distinctive feature is the Roque Nublo monolith, the second highest peak of the island.

The peak could be accessed by a car, as there is a road used by the army. The peak is located between the municipalities of Tejeda, Vega de San Mateo and San Bartolome de Tirajana.
