= Phalmuter =

Spanish heavy metal/hard rock band

- Origin: Gran Canaria, Spain
- Genres: Heavy metal Hard rock Thrash metal
- Years active: 2006−present
- Members: Jac; Kikon; Ayo
- Website: Official Website

Phalmuter is a Spanish heavy metal/hard rock band from Gran Canaria (Canary Islands). It was formed in 2006 by Enrique ("Kikon"), playing the guitar, and Jac, originally a guitarist but now the singer and bassist. In 2008, the band released their first demo, The Stall, containing 3 original songs and a cover of the Gwar song "Sick of You". In 2010 they supported Richie Kotzen and Jaded Sun at the Telde Rock Meeting music festival, followed by support for Barricada. Their second demo, "Break the D*ck", was released in 2010, containing four new songs.

In 2012, they announced a mini-tour around Ireland, visiting Cork, Clonmel, Dublin and Belfast. They present three new songs during 2020, with three video clips directed by Jac

== Band members ==
- Jac Cabrera – vocals and bass
- Kikon (Enrique Martinez) – guitars
- Ayose Mayor – drums

== Discography ==
- The Stall (EP) – 2008
- Break The D*ck (EP) – 2010
- True Bypass (single) – 2020
- Eternal Losers (single) – 2020
- We Know Why (single) – 2020
