= Gran Canaria =

Spanish island in the North Atlantic

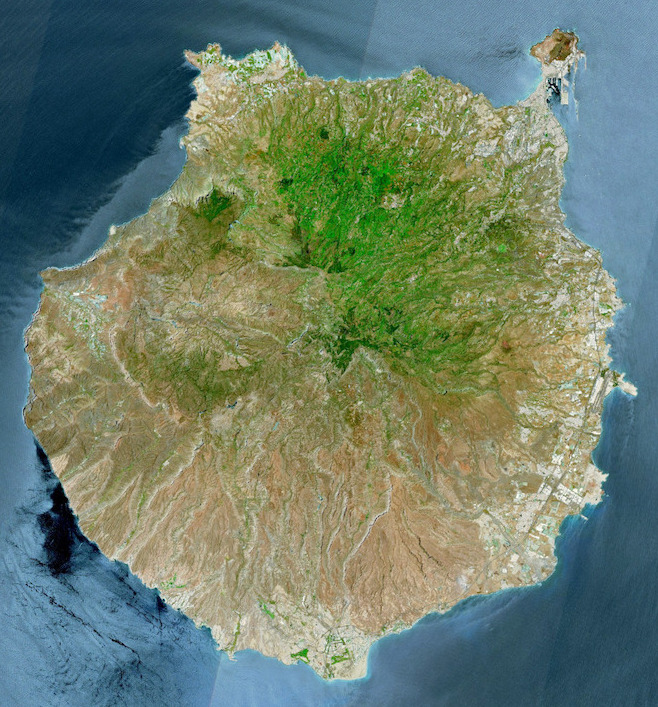
- Gran Canaria (April 2023)

Geography
- Location: Atlantic Ocean
- Coordinates: 27°58′N 15°36′W
- Area: 1,560.11 km^{2} (602.36 sq mi)
- Highest elevation: 1,956 m (6417 ft)
- Highest point: Morro de la Agujereada
- Spain
- Region: Macaronesia
- Autonomous Community: Canary Islands
- Province: Las Palmas
- Largest settlement: Las Palmas de Gran Canaria (pop. 380,863)

Demographics
- Population: 862,893 (start of 2023)
- Pop. density: 553.1/km^{2} (1432.5/sq mi)

Flag of Gran Canaria

Gran Canaria (UK: /ˌɡræn kəˈnɛəriə, -ˈnɑːr-/, US: /ˌɡrɑːn kəˈnɑːriə, -ˈnɛər-/; Spanish: [ɡɾaŋ kaˈnaɾja]), also Grand Canary Island, is the third-largest and second-most-populous island of the Canary Islands, a Spanish archipelago off the Atlantic coast of Northwest Africa. As of 2023 the island had a population of 862,893 that constitutes approximately 40% of the population of the archipelago. Las Palmas de Gran Canaria, the capital of the island, is the largest city of the Canary Islands and the ninth-largest city of Spain.

Gran Canaria is located in the Atlantic Ocean in a region known as Macaronesia about 150 kilometres (93 mi) off the northwestern coast of Africa and about 1,350 km (840 mi) from Europe. With an area of 1,560 km^{2} (600 sq mi) and an altitude of 1,956 m (6,417 ft) at Morro de la Agujereada, Gran Canaria is the third largest island of the archipelago in both area and altitude. Gran Canaria is also the third most populated island in Spain.

== History ==
In antiquity, Gran Canaria was populated by the North African Canarii, who may have arrived as early as 500 BC.

In the medieval period, after over a century of European incursions and attempts at conquest, the island was conquered on 29 April 1483, by the Crown of Castile, under Queen Isabella I. The Canarian queen Abenchara was captured and imprisoned by the Spanish during the conquest. The conquest succeeded after a war that lasted five years, and it was an important step towards the expansion of the unified Spain.

The capital city of Las Palmas de Gran Canaria was founded on 24 June 1478, under the name "Real de Las Palmas", by Juan Rejón, head of the invading Castilian army. In 1492, Christopher Columbus anchored in the Port of Las Palmas (and spent some time on the island) on his first trip to the Americas. Las Palmas de Gran Canaria is, jointly with Santa Cruz de Tenerife, the capital of the autonomous community of the Canary Islands. Much of Iberian migration to the island consisted of conversos of Jewish origin.

On 27 March 1977, a bomb went off in Gran Canaria Airport, the main airport on the island. Flights were diverted to the nearby Tenerife Airport: this led to the Tenerife airport disaster.

== Etymology ==
Pliny claimed that the island was named for the dogs on the island, of which two were presented as a gift to Juba, King of Mauretania. This opinion is disputed as when the Europeans arrived on the island, no dogs were found. Another source suggested the way the natives ate fish was doglike and this was the reason for its name. A more plausible assumption is that the island's name derives from the people Canario or Canarii living near the Atlas mountain range. Jean de Béthencourt named the island Gran Canaria as the people on the island were valorous opponents to his conquest.

== Geography ==
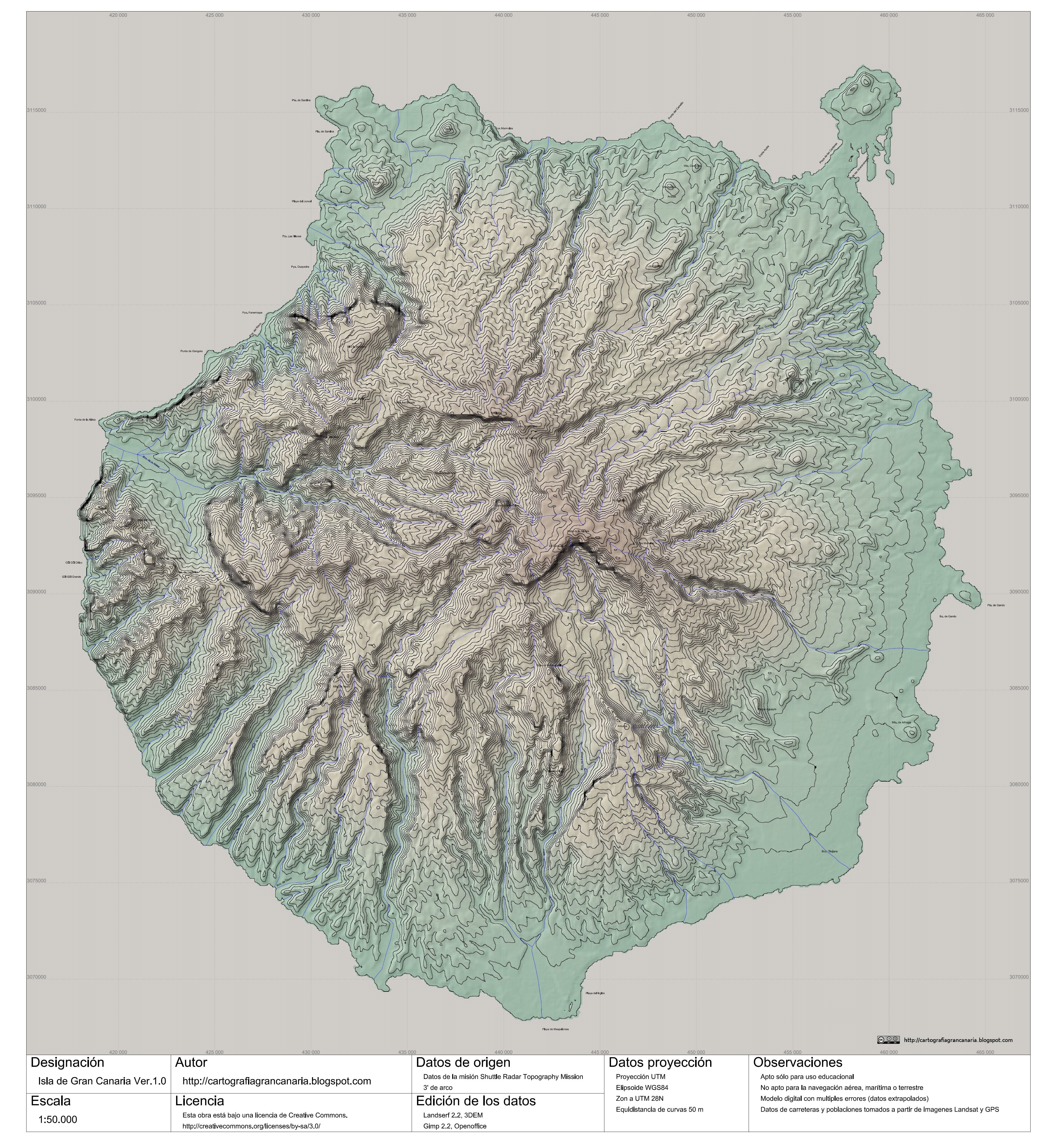
Topography of Gran Canaria

Gran Canaria is located in the Canary Islands archipelago southeast of Tenerife and west of Fuerteventura. The island is of volcanic origin, mostly made of fissure vents. It has a round shape, with a diameter of approximately 50 km (31 mi) and a surface area of 1,560 km^{2} (600 sq mi). Gran Canaria's maximum elevation is 1,956 metres (6,417 ft) at Morro de la Agujereada, although the nearby Pico de las Nieves has traditionally been considered the island's tallest peak. The coastline measures 236 km.

=== Geology ===
The viewpoint Mirador del Molino, near the Parralillo reservoir, sits right along the eroded rim of the Caldera de Tejeda, exposing the oldest geological layers of Gran Canaria. The landscape is the result of a massive Miocene volcanic collapse followed by millions of years of deep ravine erosion.

About 80% of the volume of the island was formed during the Miocene period eruptions, between 14 and 9 million years ago. This is called the "Old Cycle" and is estimated to have lasted some 200,000 years and have emitted about 1,000 km^{3} (240 cu mi), mostly of fissural alkali basalt. This cycle continued with the emission of trachytes, phonolites and peralkaline rocks. This period was followed by one of erosion, which lasted some 4 million years.

A second cycle of volcanic eruptions, known as the "Roque Nublo cycle", took place between 4.5 and 3.4 million years ago. This shorter cycle emitted about 100 km^{3} (24 cu mi). Most of the inland peaks were formed by erosion from these materials. This period also started with fissural basalts, but ended with violent eruptions of pyroclastic flows. Some phonolitic features, like the Risco Blanco, were also formed in its last stages.

The third or recent cycle is held to have started some 2.8 million years ago and is considered to be still active. The last eruptions are held to have occurred some 2000 years ago.

The changes in volume and, therefore, weight of the island have also caused the island to rise above the previous sea level during erosive periods and to sink during eruptive periods. Some of these "fossil beaches" can be seen in the cliff faces of the more eroded northern coast.

=== Climate ===
According to the Köppen climate classification, Gran Canaria is considered to have a hot desert climate (BWh) due to its severe lack of precipitation. Gran Canaria has consistent warm temperatures in spring, summer and autumn, and mild winters. Gran Canaria is noted for its rich variety of microclimates. Generally speaking though, the average daytime high ranges from 20 °C (68 °F) in winter to 26 °C (79 °F) in summer. Some cool nights occur in winter, but lows below 10 °C (50 °F) are unknown near the coast. Inland the climate is still mild but mountainous areas see the occasional frost or snow. Annual rainfall averages 228 mm (9.0 in), most of this falling in the cooler months, with July, August and September normally rainless. Rainfall is unevenly distributed through the island with some areas being much drier than others. Cloud cover and sunshine is often quite variable during the cooler months, and there can be several rather cloudy days at times in winter. Summers are generally quite sunny however, with the south of the island being most favoured.

Climate data for Gran Canaria Airport (1981–2010 normals, 1951-2025 extremes), altitude: 32 m (105 ft)
Month	Jan	Feb	Mar	Apr	May	Jun	Jul	Aug	Sep	Oct	Nov	Dec	Year
Record high °C (°F)	30.8 (87.4)	30.9 (87.6)	34.0 (93.2)	34.3 (93.7)	36.0 (96.8)	36.9 (98.4)	44.2 (111.6)	39.0 (102.2)	39.9 (103.8)	36.0 (96.8)	36.2 (97.2)	29.4 (84.9)	44.2 (111.6)
Mean daily maximum °C (°F)	20.8 (69.4)	21.2 (70.2)	22.3 (72.1)	22.6 (72.7)	23.6 (74.5)	25.3 (77.5)	26.9 (80.4)	27.5 (81.5)	27.2 (81.0)	26.2 (79.2)	24.2 (75.6)	22.2 (72.0)	24.2 (75.5)
Daily mean °C (°F)	17.9 (64.2)	18.2 (64.8)	19.0 (66.2)	19.4 (66.9)	20.4 (68.7)	22.2 (72.0)	23.8 (74.8)	24.6 (76.3)	24.3 (75.7)	23.1 (73.6)	21.2 (70.2)	19.2 (66.6)	21.1 (70.0)
Mean daily minimum °C (°F)	15.0 (59.0)	15.0 (59.0)	15.7 (60.3)	16.2 (61.2)	17.3 (63.1)	19.2 (66.6)	20.8 (69.4)	21.6 (70.9)	21.4 (70.5)	20.1 (68.2)	18.1 (64.6)	16.2 (61.2)	18.1 (64.5)
Record low °C (°F)	8.0 (46.4)	7.5 (45.5)	6.5 (43.7)	9.0 (48.2)	11.3 (52.3)	12.0 (53.6)	14.8 (58.6)	16.0 (60.8)	14.6 (58.3)	14.0 (57.2)	7.0 (44.6)	9.7 (49.5)	6.5 (43.7)
Average precipitation mm (inches)	25 (1.0)	24 (0.9)	13 (0.5)	6 (0.2)	1 (0.0)	0 (0)	0 (0)	0 (0)	9 (0.4)	16 (0.6)	22 (0.9)	31 (1.2)	151 (5.9)
Average precipitation days (≥ 1 mm)	3	3	2	1	0	0	0	0	1	2	4	5	21
Average relative humidity (%)	65	66	64	64	65	66	65	66	68	69	67	68	66
Mean monthly sunshine hours	184	191	229	228	272	284	308	300	241	220	185	179	2,821
Source: Agencia Estatal de Meteorología

== Vegetation ==
Until the conquest, Gran Canaria had extensive forests, but then suffered extensive deforestation as a result of continuous logging, land divisions and other intensive uses. This reduced the forest cover to just 56,000 hectares (140,000 acres), making the island the most deforested of the Canary Islands. However, in the twentieth century reforestation of the ridge of the island was begun, recovering some of the lost forest mass. Much of the summit of the island is forested mostly due to reforestation.

== Governance ==
Municipalities of Gran Canaria

Gran Canaria is in the autonomous community of the Canary Islands (Islas Canarias). It lies within the Province of Las Palmas, a Spanish province which consists of the eastern part of the Canary Islands community. Las Palmas de Gran Canaria is the provincial capital, one of the two capitals of the Canary Islands along with Santa Cruz de Tenerife.

The island of Gran Canaria is governed by the Cabildo insular de Gran Canaria. Gran Canaria Island itself is divided into twenty-one smaller municipalities:

Name	Area (km^{2})	Census Population			Estimated Population (2023)
Name	Area (km^{2})	2001	2011	2021	Estimated Population (2023)
Agaete	45.50	5,202	5,735	5,692	5,593
Agüimes	79.28	20,124	29,641	32,320	32,797
Artenara	66.70	1,319	1,252	1,049	1,036
Arucas	33.01	32,466	36,771	38,559	38,655
Firgas	15.77	6,865	7,607	7,526	7,701
Gáldar	61.59	22,154	24,358	24,493	24,728
Ingenio	38.15	24,439	30,022	31,856	32,356
Mogán	172.44	12,444	22,847	20,527	20,938
Moya	31.87	8,137	8,043	7,841	7,887
La Aldea de San Nicolás	123.58	7,668	8,522	7,518	7,523
Las Palmas de Gran Canaria	100.55	354,863	381,271	380,667	380,863
San Bartolomé de Tirajana	333.13	34,515	53,440	53,429	54,668
Santa Brígida	23.81	17,598	18,878	18,272	18,598
Santa Lucía de Tirajana	61.56	47,652	66,725	73,921	76,418
Santa María de Guía de Gran Canaria	42.59	13,893	14,149	13,886	13,971
Tejeda	103.30	2,400	2,136	1,874	1,846
Telde	102.43	87,949	101,080	103,175	103,240
Teror	25.70	12,042	12,857	12,683	12,831
Valleseco	22.11	3,949	3,896	3,779	3,766
Valsequillo de Gran Canaria	39.15	7,964	9,118	9,416	9,693
Vega de San Mateo	37.89	6,979	7,737	7,655	7,785
Totals	1,560.11	730,622	846,085	856,137	862,893

The island has a population at the start of 2023 of 862,893 - with 380,863 of those in the capital city of Las Palmas de Gran Canaria. Gran Canaria is the second most populous island of the Canary Islands, after Tenerife.

== Transportation ==
=== Roads ===
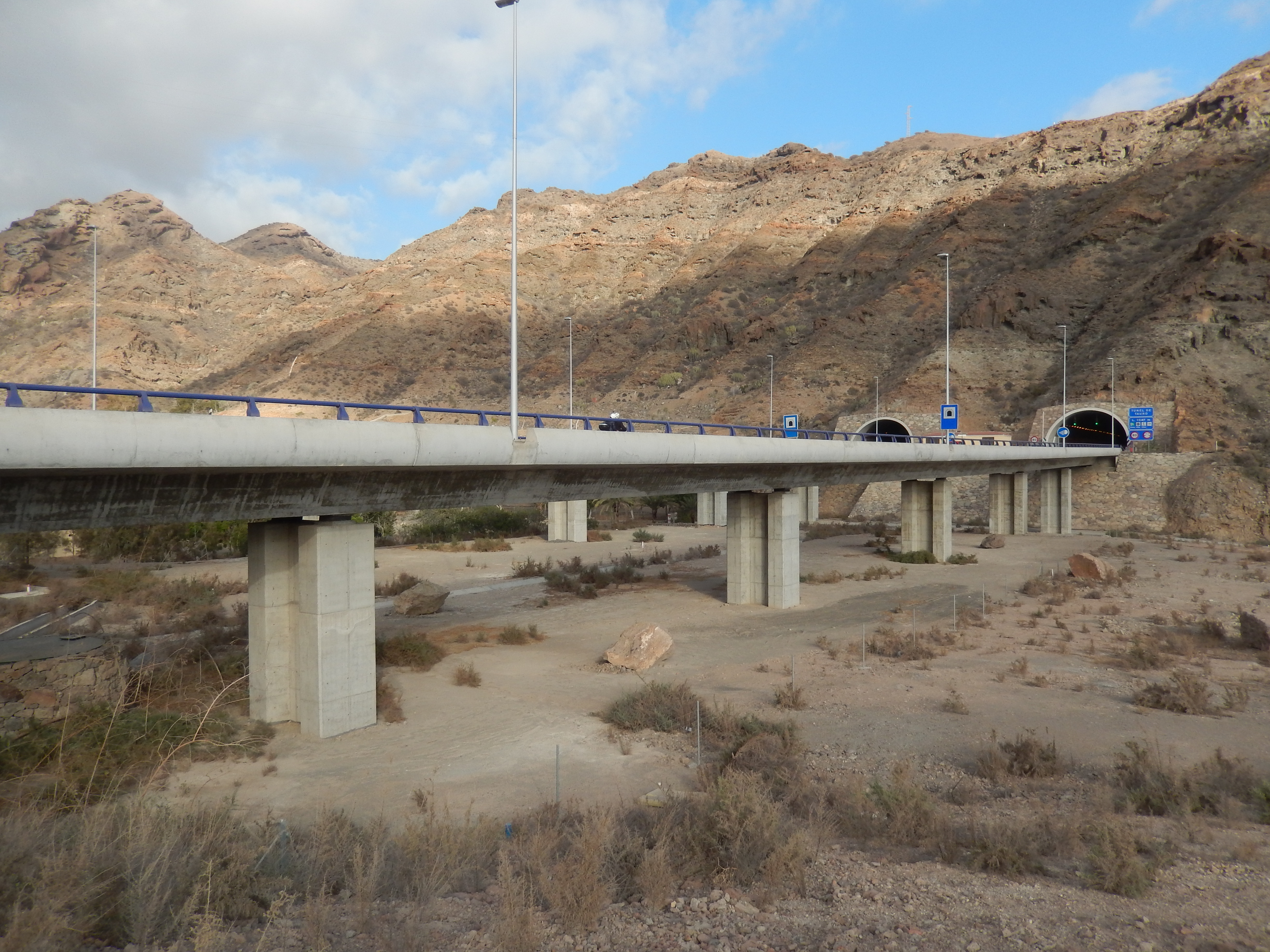
Autopistas in Gran Canaria provide rapid road transport around the coast

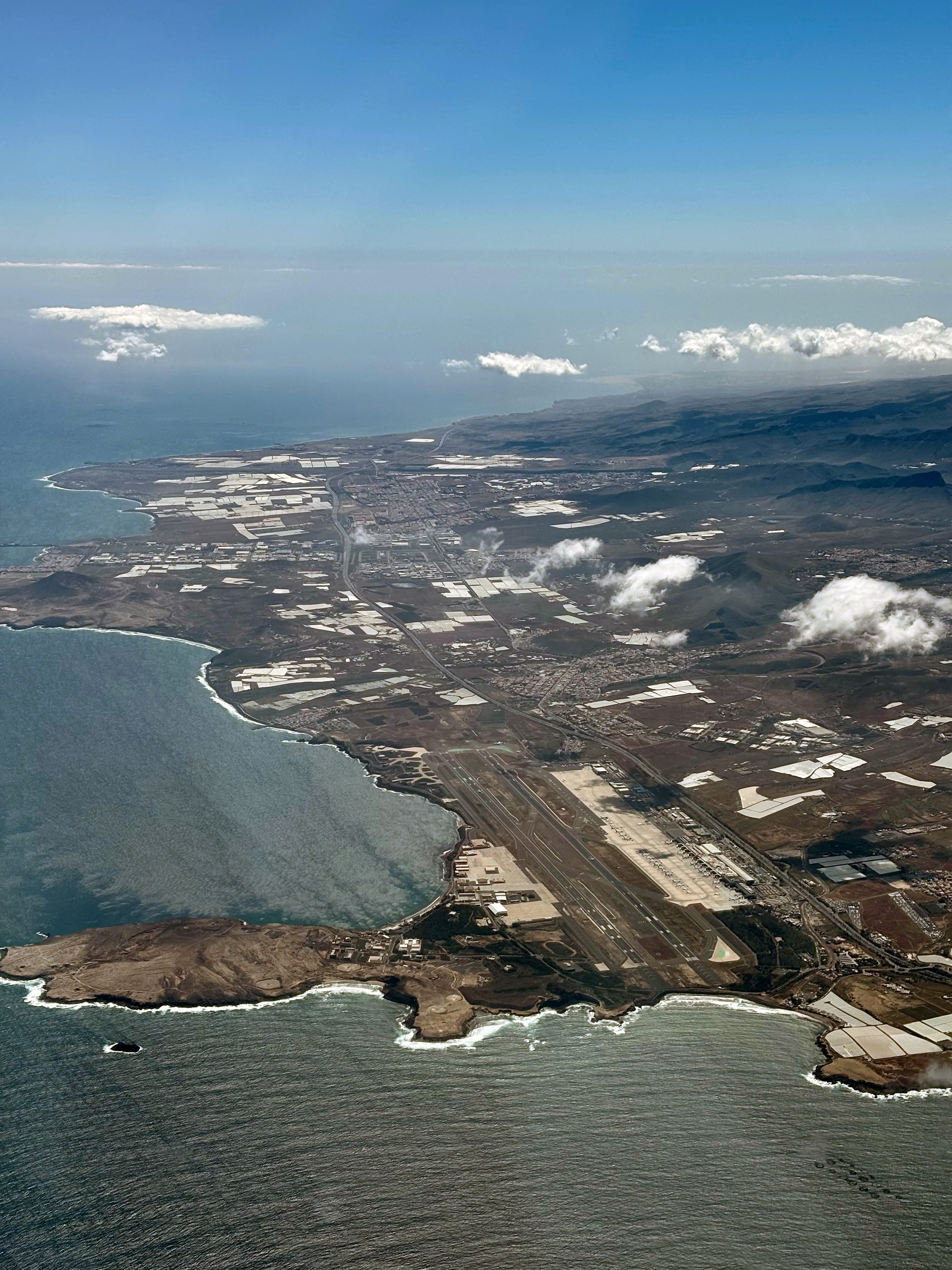
Gran Canaria Airport

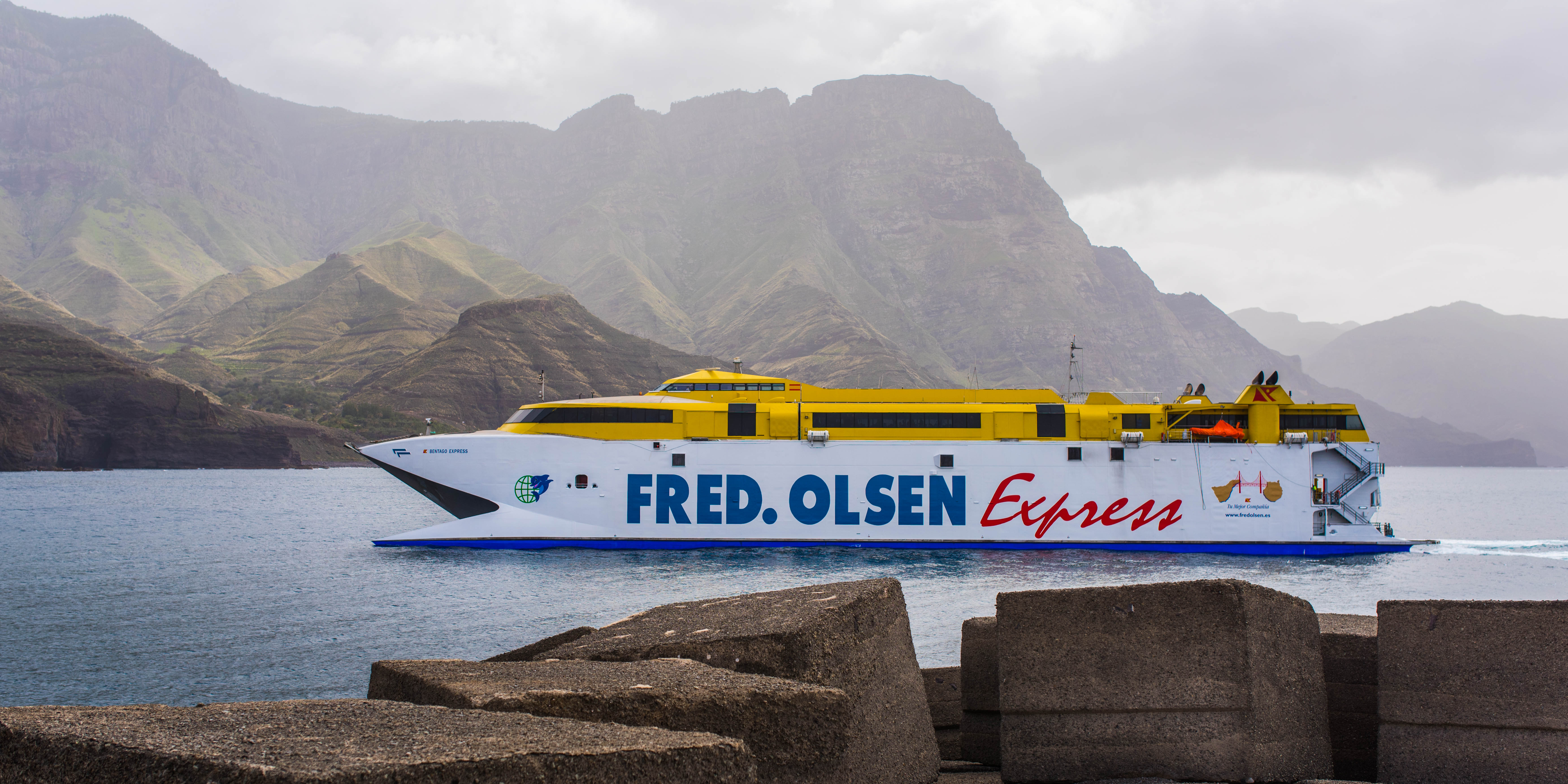
The Tenerife catamaran ferry

Gran Canaria has roads encircling the whole island and extending into the mountain areas. In the late 20th century, its dual carriageway, among the first in the Canary Islands, were opened and run around Las Palmas de Gran Canaria, and were later extended to the north coast and the airport and subsequently to the south coast in response to increased tourist traffic. The only highway of Gran Canaria are GC1. Dual carriageway is GC2, and GC31, GC4 and GC5. The western and the north-western parts, with the fewest inhabitants, are linked only with main roads.

=== Buses ===
Public transport around Gran Canaria is provided by an extensive bus network, known in the local dialect as guaguas. The Autoridad Única del Transporte de Gran Canaria (Gran Canaria Transport Authority, TGC) manages the network and operates a number of bus stations across the island, including San Telmo and Santa Catalina bus stations in Las Palmas, Maspalomas and Galdar. Bus tickets may be purchased with cash, and AUTGC also operates a contactless electronic ticket called the TransGC Card, which is valid across the whole network.

Inter-urban bus services across the island are operated by the Global bus company. Global was created in 2000 after the merger of two bus companies, Utinsa (which operated in the north of the island) and Salcai (the bus operator for the south). Local bus services in Las Palmas are run by the municipal bus company, Guaguas Municipales de Las Palmas de Gran Canaria.

=== Airport ===
Gran Canaria Airport (IATA: LPA) is the only commercial airport on the island. The large number of aircraft and passengers passing through it each year make it one of the busiest in Spain. Gran Canaria is also responsible for all air traffic control in the Canaries. By destination island, Gran Canaria is the second island that congregates the largest number of passengers in the Canary Islands. Car rental companies are located at the airport.

=== Sea ports ===
The most important ports in the island are the Port of Las Palmas (Puerto de la Luz), in the city of Las Palmas de Gran Canaria; Arguineguín, which exports cement from a large factory; and Arinaga, located in the main industrial zone of Canaries and one of the major ones of Spain.

The main passenger ports are the Port of La Luz, where Trasmediterránea operates a weekly ferry route to Cádiz on the Spanish mainland, and the Port of Las Nieves, located in Agaete on the west side of the island, where Fred Olsen Express operates a catamaran ferry service to Santa Cruz de Tenerife.

Gran Canaria is connected by regular ferry services to mainland Spain and other Canary Islands, including routes from Cádiz and Tenerife.

=== Rail ===
Plans for a Tren de Gran Canaria railway network linking the capital with the south have been approved by both the Gran Canaria Cabildo and the autonomous Canary Islands' Government, though the discussion with the central Spanish Government hinges now on budget. The planned 57 km (35 mi) railway line would run between Las Palmas and Meloneras, with the section in the capital running entirely underground as far as the suburb of Jinámar. The line is planned to have 11 stations, including an underground station at Gran Canaria Airport. The scheme was first announced in 2009, with a planned operational date in 2015. A public company called Ferrocarriles de Gran Canaria has been formed by the Cabildo's Gran Canaria Transport Authority. Plans were still being discussed in 2018. As of late 2025, some progress had been made in making the railway project a reality.

== Agriculture ==
Gran Canaria agriculture is unique among the Canaries islands in that it was traditionally dominated by plantations, with much of these being grains as well as sugarcane, rather than by stock-breeding. The caves of Valerón (a property of cultural interest in the "archaeological site" category) in the municipality of Santa María de Guía bears testimony of it by being the largest pre-Hispanic collective granary of the Canaries.

== Tourism ==
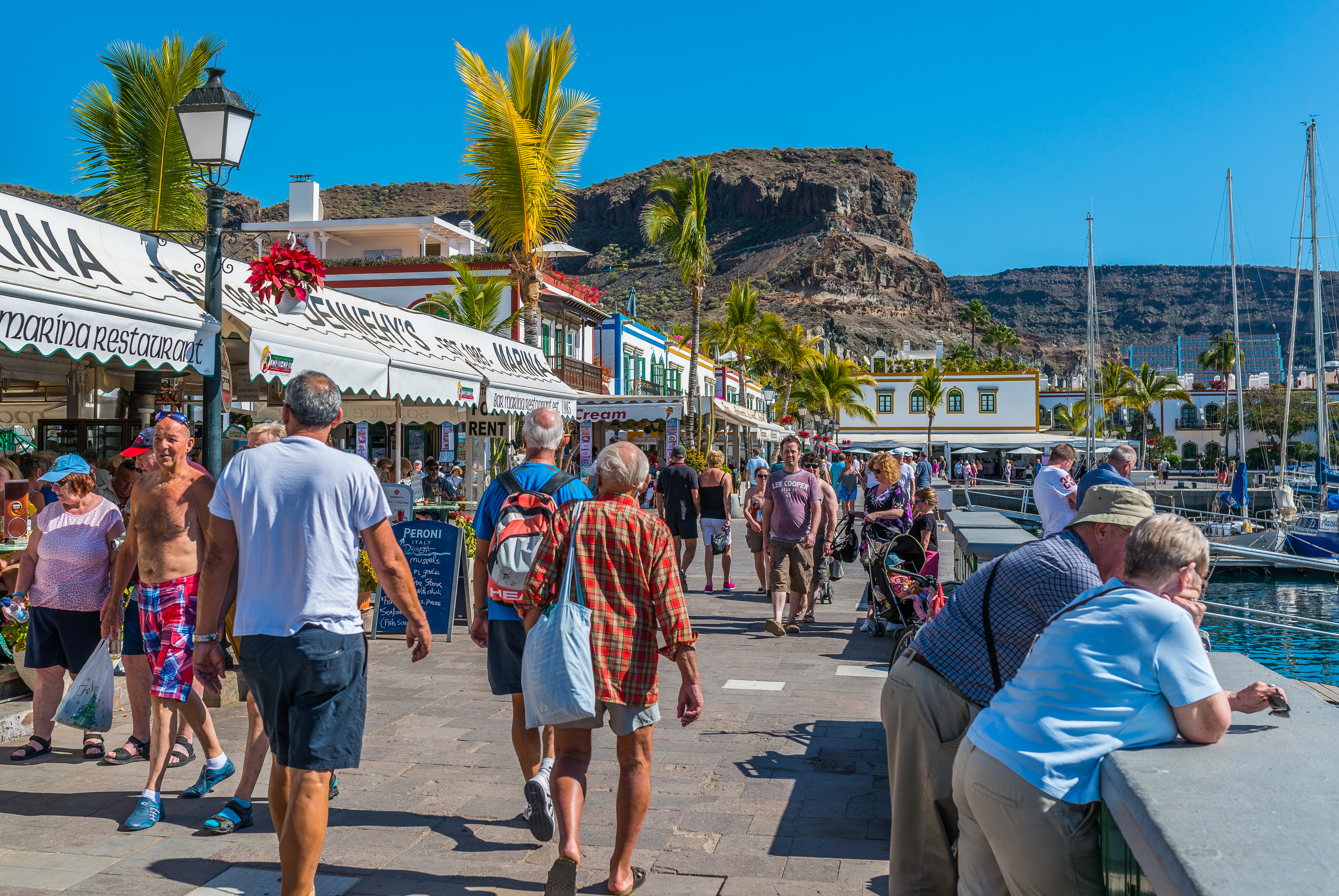
Puerto de Mogán

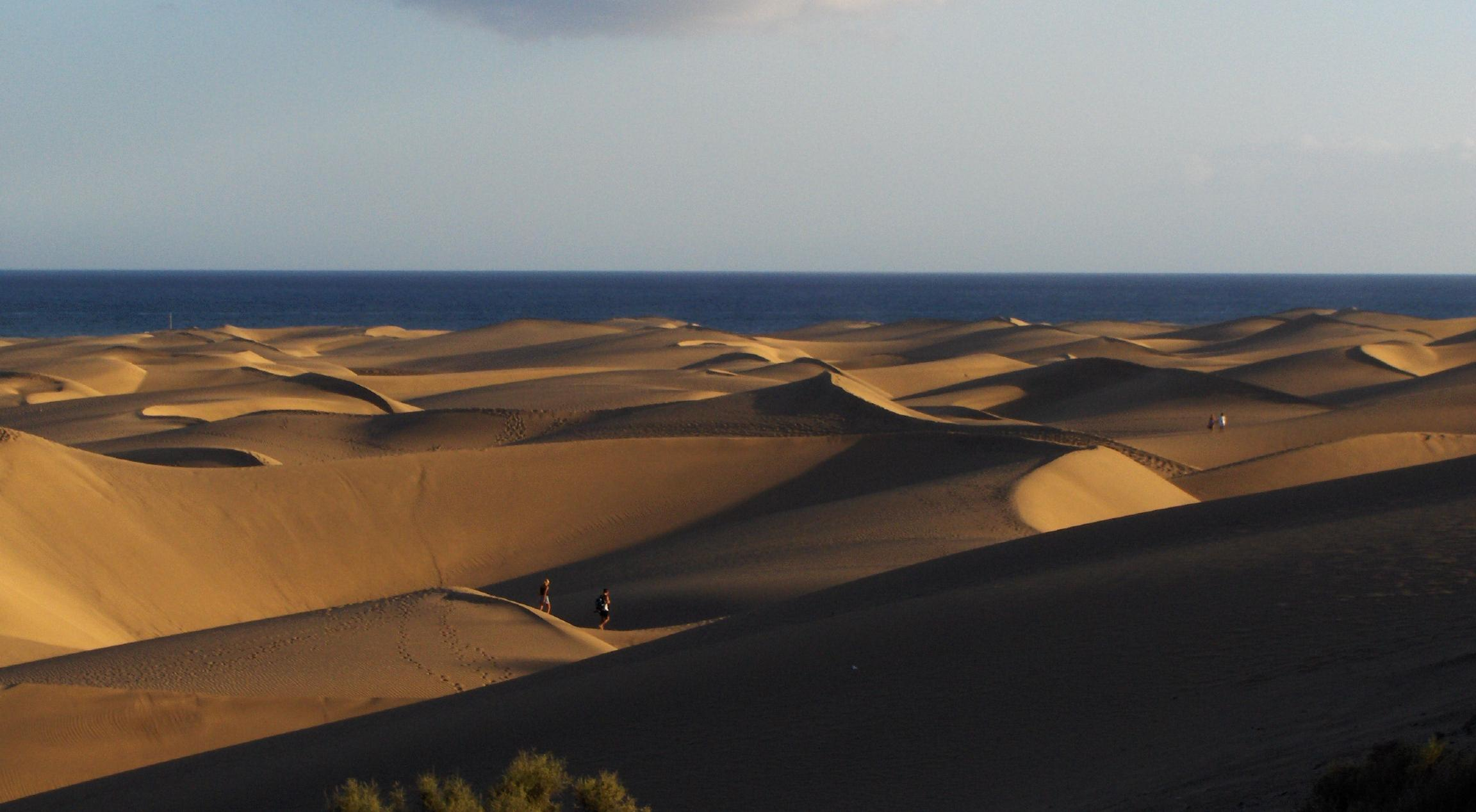
The "Dunas de Maspalomas", in southern Gran Canaria

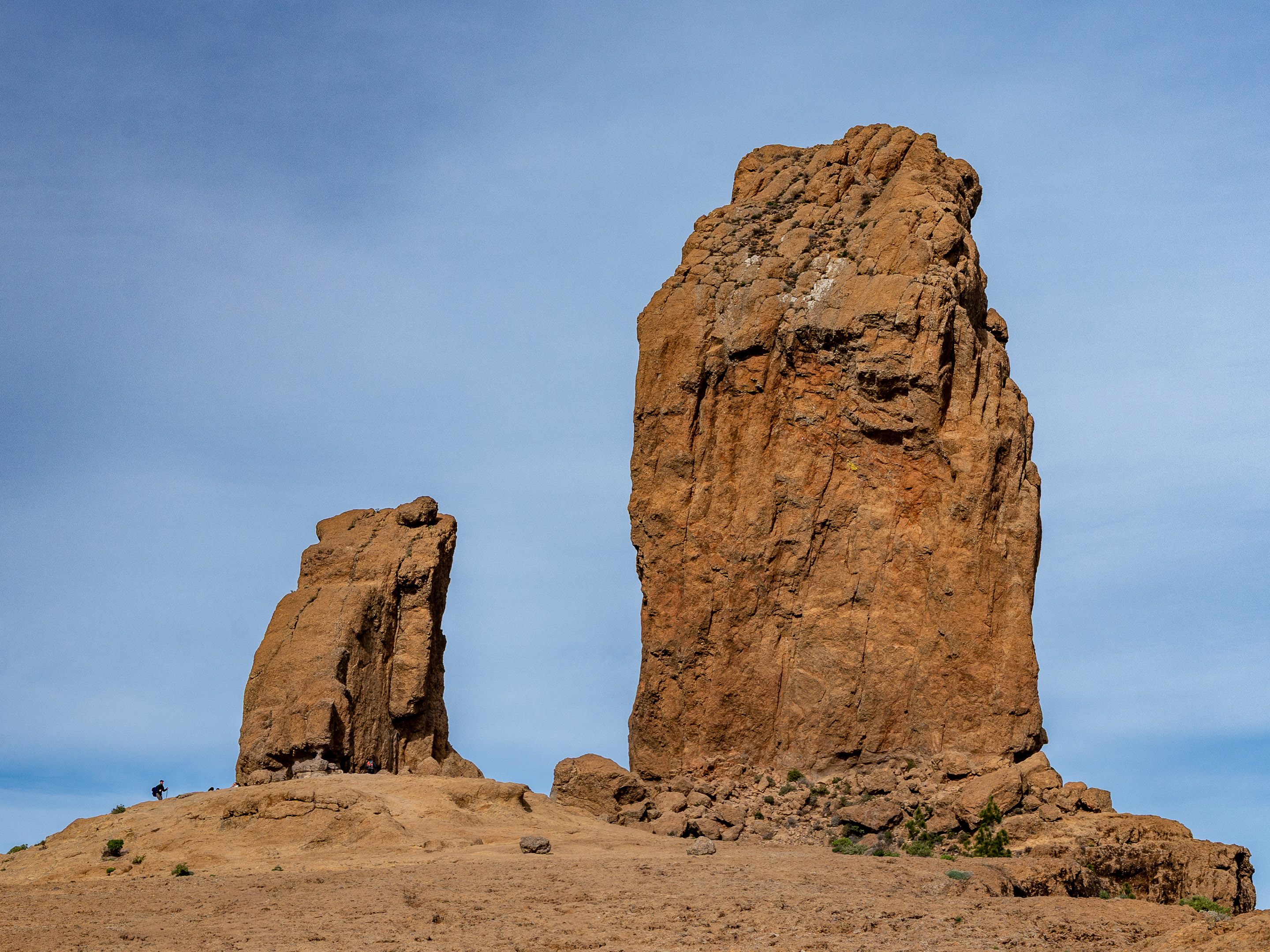
Roque Nublo in the interior of the island

The island is called a "miniature continent" due to the different climates and variety of landscapes found, with long beaches and dunes of white sand, contrasting with green ravines and picturesque villages. A third of the island is under protection as a Biosphere Reserve by UNESCO.

The number of annual visitors was 3.6 million in 2014 (of which 450,000 were Spaniards). It is the second island in the archipelago in number of annual tourists, after Tenerife. Most of the tourists visit the southern part of the island. The north tends to be cooler, while the south is warmer and sunny. The east coast of the island is flat, dotted with beaches, while the western coast is rockier and mountainous.

The island possesses 32 Natural Protected Spaces, notably the Rural Park of Nublo, The Doramas Jungle, the Azuaje Ravine, Tamadaba, Pino Santo, etc.

In the south there is a large bird park, Palmitos Park, as well as many beach resort communities. Resorts are concentrated in the central eastern part of the southern coast in the Maspalomas area, which includes the towns of San Agustín, Playa del Inglés and Meloneras. The Maspalomas Dunes are located between Playa del Inglés ("The Englishman's Beach") and the distinctive 19th century Maspalomas lighthouse. Playa del Ingles is home to the Yumbo Centre, which was opened in 1982 and has almost 200 shops, including bars, restaurants, cafes, fashion boutiques, electronic outlets and jewellery stores.

In Tarajalillo, an Aeroclub exists from where tourist flights can be taken over the island.

Still further to the west along the southern shore, in the Municipality of Mogán, are the communities of Puerto Rico and Puerto de Mogán, a village referred to as "Little Venice" on account of its many canals.

Other attractions include Cocodrilos Park, Roque Nublo (an 80 m monolith), Cenobio de Valerón with more than 350 storage cavities, Painted cave of Galdar the most important archaeological park in Canary Islands, or the botanical gardens Jardín Canario (in Tafira Alta) and Cactualdea (in La Aldea de San Nicolás).

El Dedo de Dios, or "God's Finger", was a rocky spire jutting from the sea in Puerto de las Nieves, and was previously the signature attraction of the Canary Islands until it was destroyed by tropical storm Delta that crossed the archipelago in November 2005.

Other well-known rock formations are El Cura (also known as El Fraile), The Frog (La Rana), Roque Bentayga, the Roque de Gando, and the Peñón Bermejo. Traditionally, the highest peak of the island has been considered to be the Pico de las Nieves, at 1,949 metres (6,394 ft); however, Morro de la Agujereada is taller, at 1,956 metres (6,417 ft).

The capital city is Las Palmas de Gran Canaria. Las Canteras beach, a protected area and diving zone, lies in the heart of the city. Las Palmas de Gran Canaria is also known for its annual carnaval. It was the first stop of Christopher Columbus' expedition on his way back from the Americas, a commemoration of which is the Hermitage of San Antonio Abad, where the navigator prayed, and the Casa de Colón. Other attractions in the capital city include the Museo Canario (the most important archaeology museum in the archipelago), the cathedral and the Plaza del Espíritu Santo. In Teror the shrine of Virgen del Pino ("Virgin of the Pine"), patron saint of Gran Canaria, can be found. Its feast is celebrated on 8 September.

The town of Agüimes is located in the eastern part of the island. Its historic center features a central square and church characteristic of traditional Canarian architecture. The district also includes the Guayadeque ravine, a protected area containing numerous cave dwellings, including a cave church built into the mountainside and several cave restaurants. Additionally, the marine reserve at playa de El Cabrón is located in the district. It is situated near the town of Arinaga.

Other important towns are Telde, known among other things for their surf schools in Salinetas, Vecindario (within the municipality of Santa Lucía de Tirajana) and Gáldar, that contains an important diving zone. In Arucas there is a Neogothic temple, popularly known as "Arucas' Cathedral", as well as a large fertile plain where bananas are grown. In Gáldar and its surroundings there is also a banana-growing plain and some remarkable archaeological remains, such as the Painted cave of Galdar or the cenobio de Valerón's communal silos, ancient tombs (among which the necropolis of Maipés), and the port of Sardina del Norte (one of the island's ports where, as in Las Palmas', Christopher Columbus used to get supplies for his ships).

Heading west along the southern coast is the fishing city of Arguineguín in the Municipality of Mogán.

== Natural symbols ==
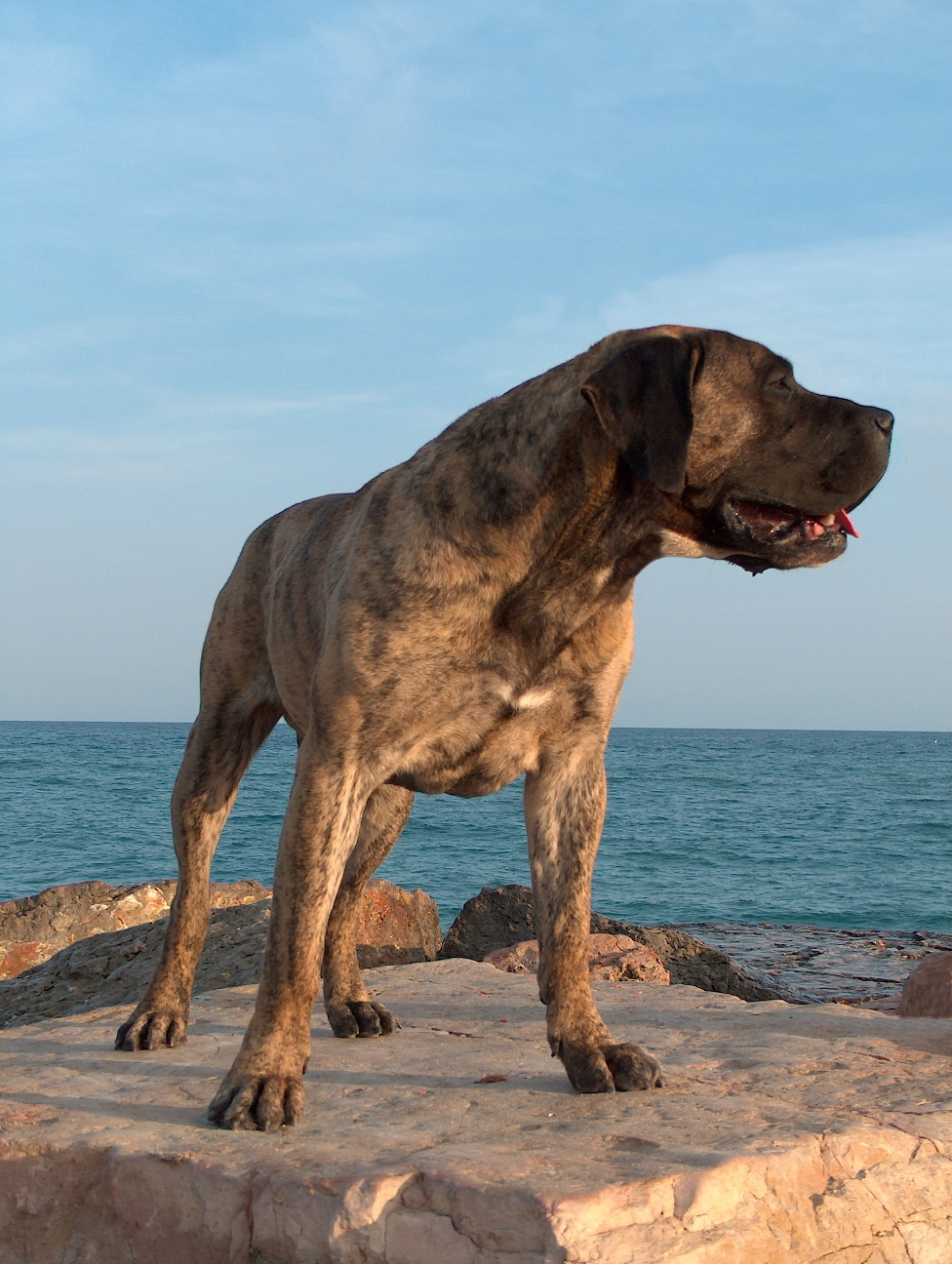
Canary Mastiff

The official natural symbols associated with Gran Canaria are the Canary Mastiff and Euphorbia canariensis (Cardón)

== Beaches ==
- Playa de Maspalomas
- Playa de Meloneras
- Playa de las Canteras
- Playa Dedo de Dios
- Playa de Güi Güi
- Playa de Amadores
- Playa de Tufia y Aguadulce
- Playa de Tiritaña
- Playa del Risco de Agaete
- Playa del Inglés
- Playa de los Chachos

== Protected natural areas ==
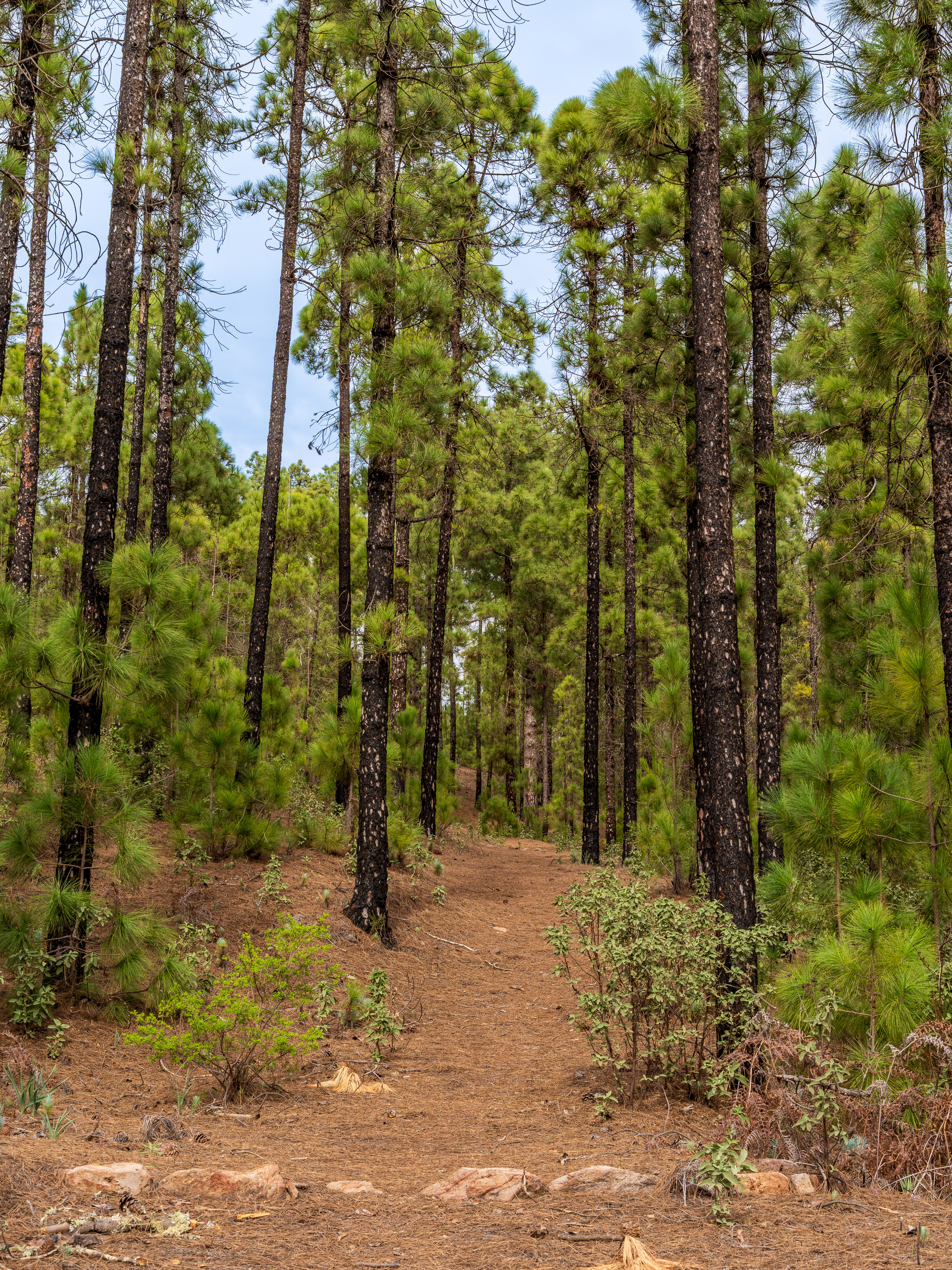
Pinus canariensis forest in Tamadaba Natural Park

Nearly half of the island territory – 667 km^{2} (258 sq mi) (42.7% of island) – is under protection from the Red Canaria de Espacios Naturales Protegidos (Canary Islands Network for Protected Natural Areas). Of the 146 protected sites under control of network in the Canary Islands archipelago, a total of 33 are located in Gran Canaria, the second most protected island in the group. There are seven different categories of protection:

1. Six nature reserves – El Brezal, Azuaje, Los Tilos de Moya, Los Marteles, Las Dunas de Maspalomas and Güigüi (total 7,153.1 ha)
2. Two integral nature reserves – Inagua and Barranco Oscuro (total 3,955,5 ha)
3. Two natural parks – Tamadaba and Pilancones (total 13,333 ha)
4. Two rural parks – Nublo and Doramas (total 29,893.4 ha)
5. Ten natural monuments – Amagro, Bandama, Montañón Negro, Roque de Aguayro, Tauro, Arinaga, Barranco de Guayadeque, Riscos de Tirajana, Roque Nublo and Barranco del Draguillo (total 5,264.9 ha)
6. Seven protected landscapes – La Isleta (in the capital Las Palmas de Gran Canaria), Pino Santo, Tafira, Las Cumbres, Lomo Magullo, Fataga and Montaña de Agüimes (total 12,680.9 ha)
7. Four sites of scientific interest – Jinámar, Tufia, Roque de Gando and Juncalillo del Sur (total 276.2 ha).

== Music ==
- Phalmuter (2006−present), a Spanish heavy metal/hard rock band from Gran Canaria.
- Quevedo (rapper) (2001−present), a Spanish rapper and singer from Gran Canaria.

== Science and technology ==
In the 1960s, Gran Canaria was selected as the location for one of the 14 ground stations in the Manned Space Flight Network (MSFN) to support the NASA space program. Maspalomas Station, located in the south of the island, took part in a number of space missions including the Apollo 11 Moon landings and Skylab. Today it continues to support satellite communications as part of the ESA network.

== Sports ==
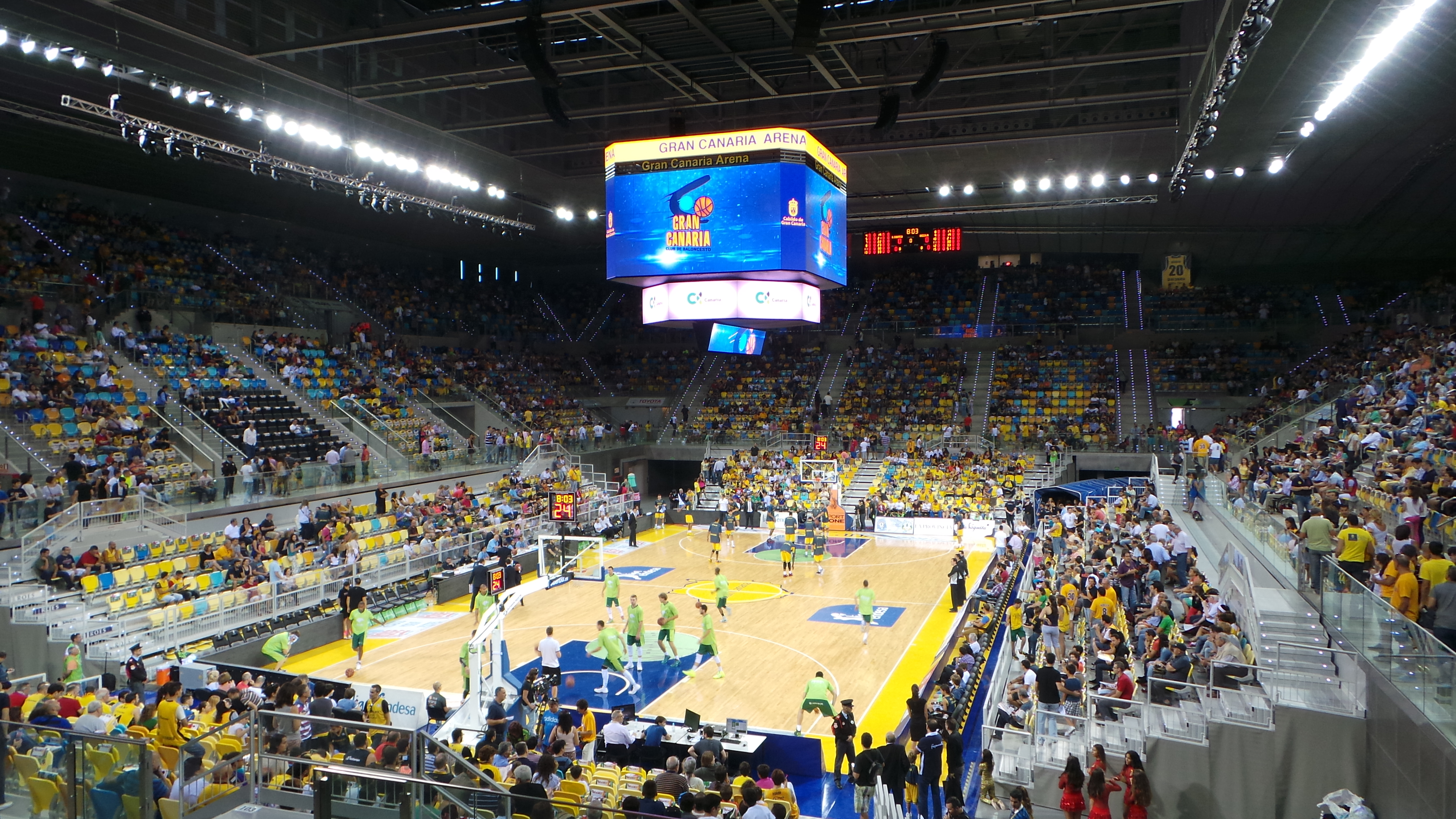
2014 game between Herbalife Gran Canaria and Unicaja

The island is home to CB Gran Canaria – a basketball club playing in Liga ACB at the Gran Canaria Arena, with a capacity of 11,000. The island is also home to UD Las Palmas – a football club playing in Segunda Division at the Estadio de Gran Canaria, with a capacity of 32,392. Professional Windsurfers Association (PWA) holds its annual competitions at Pozo - Pozo Izquierdo: This spot, which is situated in the municipal area of Santa Lucía, is internationally famous on account of the ideal windsurfing conditions, the wind being ever present.

== See also ==
- Geology of the Canary Islands
- Zona franca de las Palmas de Gran Canaria

== Bibliography ==
- Andrews, Sarah; Quintero, Josephine (2007). Canary Islands. Lonely Planet. ISBN 978-1741045956.

=== Geology of Gran Canaria ===
- Carracedo, Juan Carlos; Day, Simon (2002). Canary Islands. Terra (Harpenden). ISBN 978-1741045956., pp. 97–136
