= Tejeda =

- Municipality
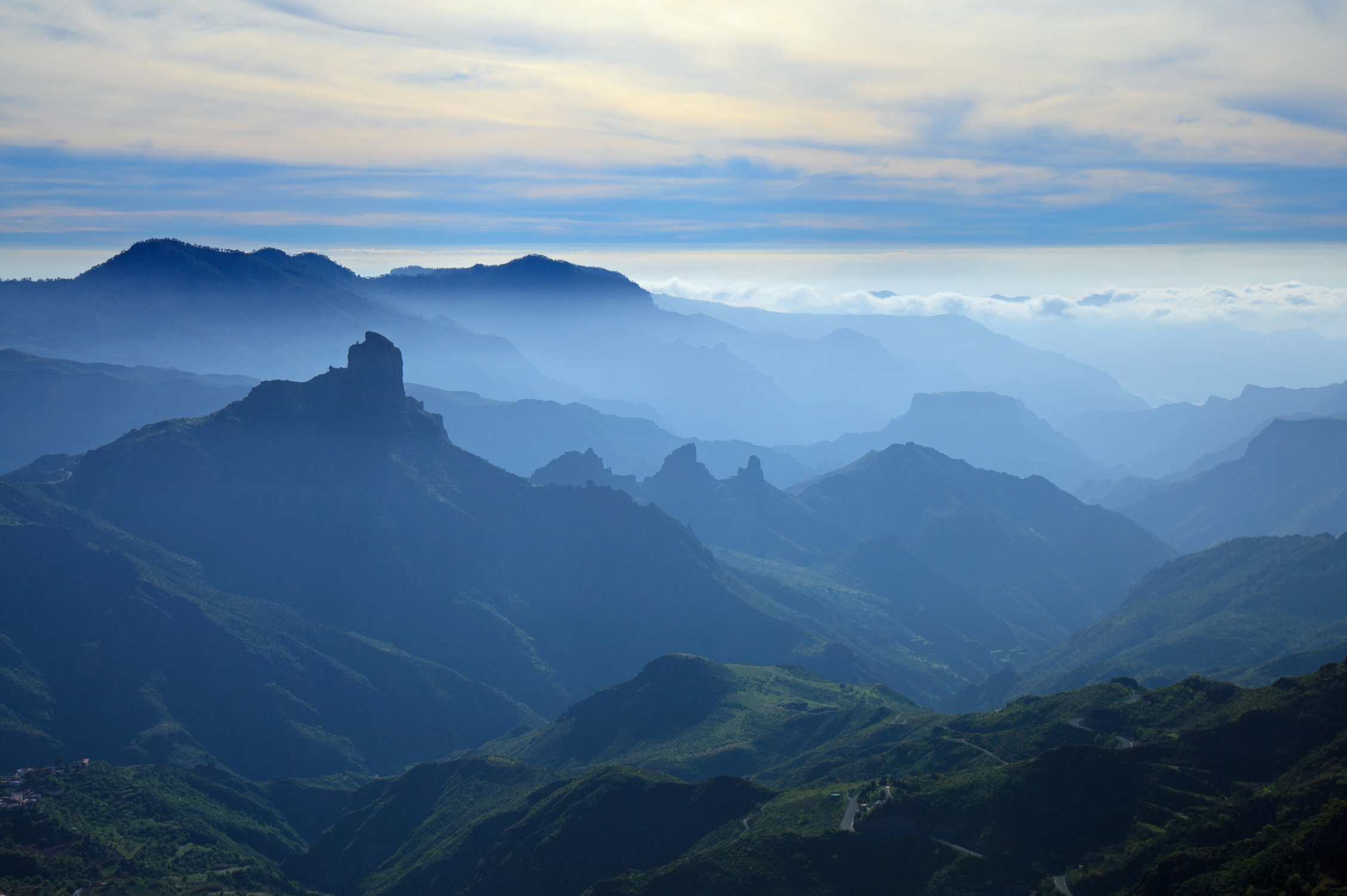
- Mist over the caldera of Tejeda

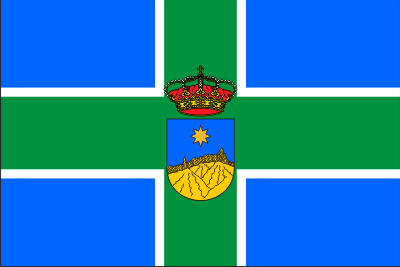
- Flag Coat of arms

- Municipal location in Gran Canaria

- Location in the province of Las Palmas Tejeda (Canary Islands) Tejeda (Spain, Canary Islands)
- Coordinates: 27°59′40″N 15°36′50″W
- Country: Spain
- Autonomous Region: Canary Islands
- Province: Las Palmas
- Island: Gran Canaria

Area
  - Total: 103.30 km^{2} (39.88 sq mi)
- Elevation: 1,050 m (3,440 ft)

Population (2025-01-01)
  - Total: 1,806
  - Density: 17.48/km^{2} (45.28/sq mi)
- Time zone: UTC+0 (GMT)

Tejeda is a village and a municipality in the mountainous central part of the island of Gran Canaria in the province of Las Palmas in the Canary Islands.

== Location ==
The village of Tejeda is situated 6 km (4 mi) north-west of the Pico de las Nieves and 23 km (14 mi) south-west of the island capital Las Palmas.

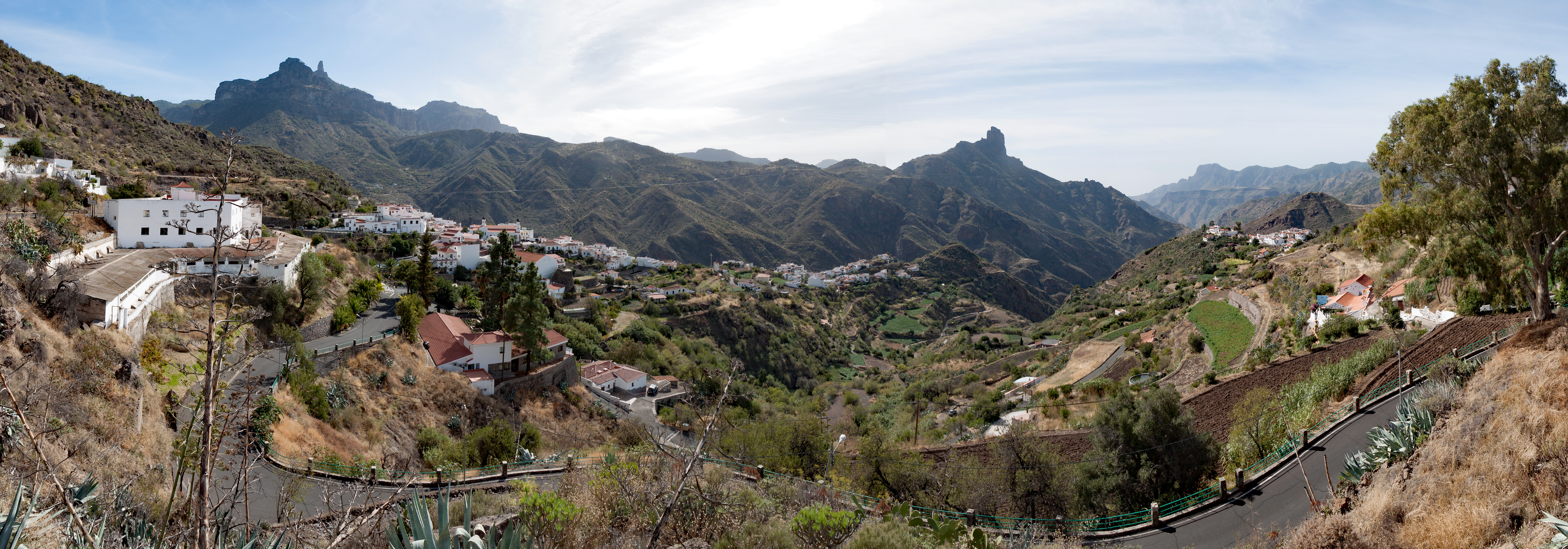
Tejeda with Roque Nublo and Roque Bentayga

== Geography ==
The municipality's area is 103.3 km^{2} (39.9 sq mi), spreading near the centre of the island, on the latter's west side.

The south-eastern part of its territory includes the second highest point of Gran Canaria island, Pico de las Nieves ("Snows Peak") - 1,949 m (6,394 ft). Other remarkable summits in the municipality are Roque Nublo ("Cloud Rock") 813 m (2,667 ft) and Roque Bentayga ("Bentayga Rock") with its ritual place (almogarén) and other features. Close by are the cuevas del Rey ("the King's caves", 1 km to the west of Rock Bentayga), an antique cave house village with granaries; and 2 km further west the antique cave house village of Acusa Seca. All these sites are listed Spanish Heritage as Properties of cultural interest ("Bien de Interés Cultural").

=== Geology : caldera de Tejeda ===
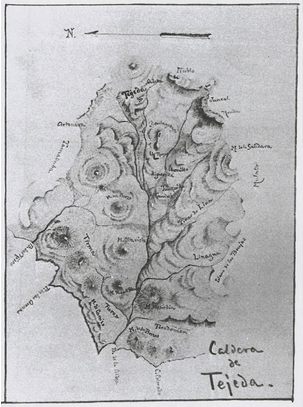
The caldera, drawing by Víctor Grau-Bassas

The village of Tejeda sits on the eastern edge of a volcanic basin or crater that bears its name (caldera de Tejeda). (Note: Video (0.28') of the Caldera de Tejeda seen from the Degollada de la Becerra.) (Note: (in Spanish) Gran Canaria - Origen y formación ("Grand Canary: origin and formation") on gevic.net. This page includes an evolutive diagram showing the main stages of formation and evolution of Gran Canaria island, with the resultant collapsed Tejeda crater.)

The caldera's dimensions are 28 km x 18 km, with a surface that extends from the head of Agaete's ravine (barranco de Agaete) near Artenara, to Verde Andén ("Green Platform") in the west, Veneguera and the head of Mogán ravine (barranco de Mogán) up to Arguineguín's ravine (barranco de Arguineguin). Only half of its perimeter remains standing; on what is left of it are found a few green-bluish peaks (such as "azulejos" de Veneguera - "Veneguera's tiles") and below these are the oldest basalts of the island, primitive substrate of Grand Canary.

The caldera was produced in probably less than two hours, by the explosion of the residual magma chambers (Note: Residual magma chambers are the cavities that hold the magma that is not projected outside during an eruption. They usually lay 2 to 3 km underground. After an eruption the magma in the chamber slowly cools down, at the same time as heavy particles that it may contain, such as iron, fall at the bottom of the chamber – thus capping the hole by which magma comes out from the Earth’s mantle. When more magma is injected outwards from the mantle, that cap bursts under the pressure and the magma within the chamber violently erupts outward. The outer surface above the chamber then collapses.) During the collapse of the caldera de Tejera ignimbrite rock was produced, with a pink matrix dotted with white crystals. It exists because the explosive eruption by which the caldera collapsed was so powerful that the magma was pulverized in a very fine spray and created almost microscopic structures in the matrix rock. Ignimbrita is found on the outside of the periphery of the caldera.
The caldera also bears traces of a 2 million year period of evolution. This is especially notable at the heads of the Agaete ravine (barranco de Agaete) and Mogan ravine (barranco de Mogan), where we can see horizontal basaltic lavas in their lower parts and, above, thicker material in sloping layers.

Another rare feature of the caldera is its system of conical dykes in its center, that were damaged by the eruptions and determined the structure of the island by their own structure. The lava passed through these dykes during some eruptions, in particular basaltic eruptions; this created a crack in the surrounding channels where the lava was injected, and from them the volcano arose. In Grand Canary these conical dykes were centered on a focal point located roughly 2 km under sea level, at what was in the past the center of the island. New magma would then tend to also take the same conical shape. Conical dykes of this size are not found in other islands; Vallehermoso on La Gomera island has some smaller ones.

Biologist Juan Sergio Socorro considers this crater to be one of the few clear examples in the world of a very large collapsed volcanic crater, particularly in comparison to the Cañadas del Teide for which several theories are held regarding its formation. (Note: Formation of the Cañadas del Teide: the main alternative theory about their formation is that of a gravitational slide, which seems to be the most probable in regard of the scientific evidences.)

"El espectáculo es imponente. Todas aquellas negras murallas de la gran caldera, con sus crestas, que parecen almenas, con sus roques enhiestos, ofrecen el aspecto de una visión dantesca. No otra cosa pueden ser las calderas del Infierno que visitó el florentino. Es una tremenda conmoción de las entrañas de la tierra; parece todo una tempestad petrificada, pero una tempestad de fuego, de lava, más que de agua."
("The spectacle is impressive. All those black walls of the great caldera, with its crests, which look like battlements, with its erect rocks, offer a Dantesque vision. The cauldrons of Hell that the Florentine visited can be no different. It is a tremendous commotion of the entrails of the earth; it looks quite like a petrified storm, but a storm of fire, of lava, more than of water.")

— Miguel de Unamuno, quoted in artenara.es.

=== Iglesia Nuestra Señora del Socorro ===
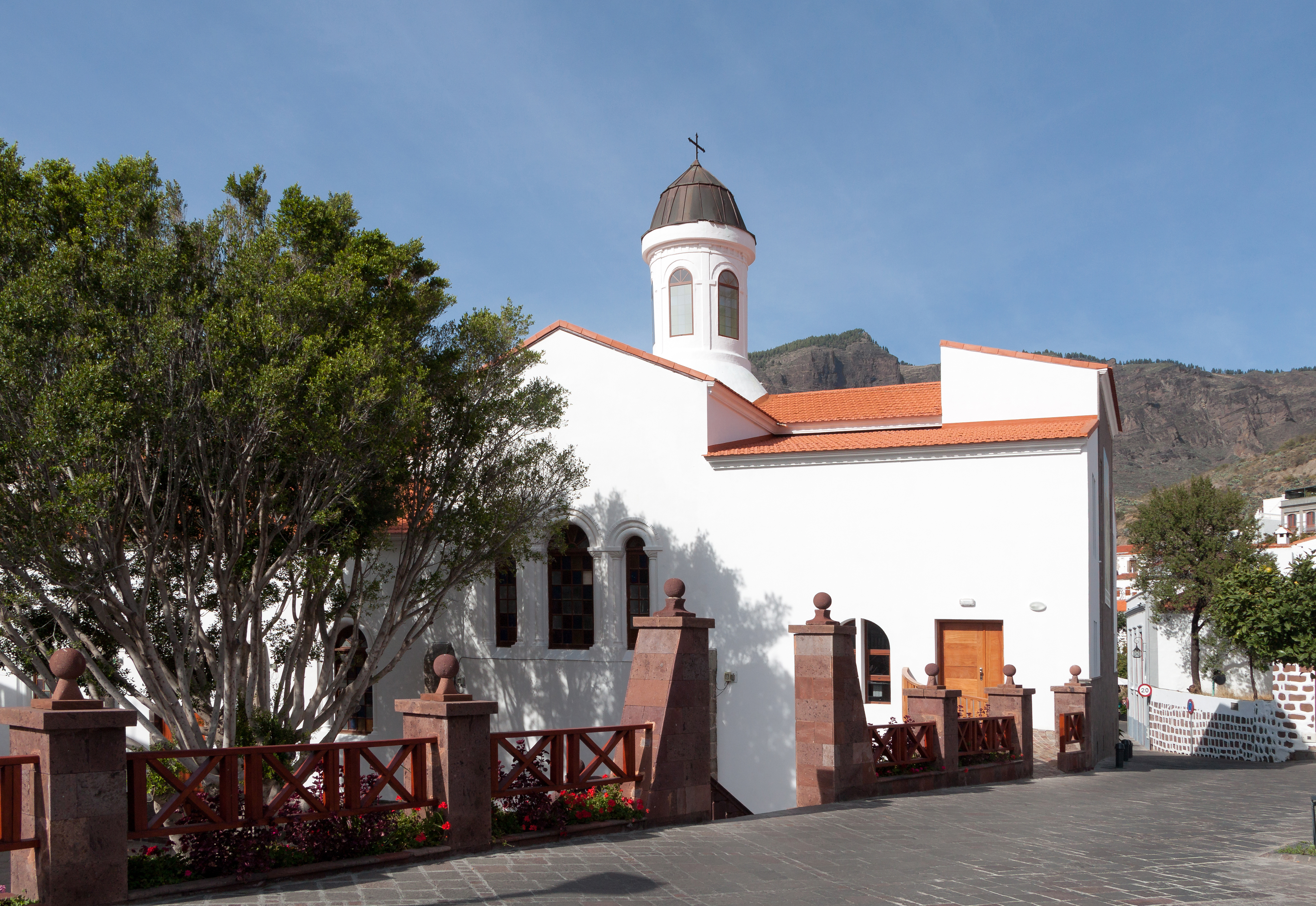
View from south

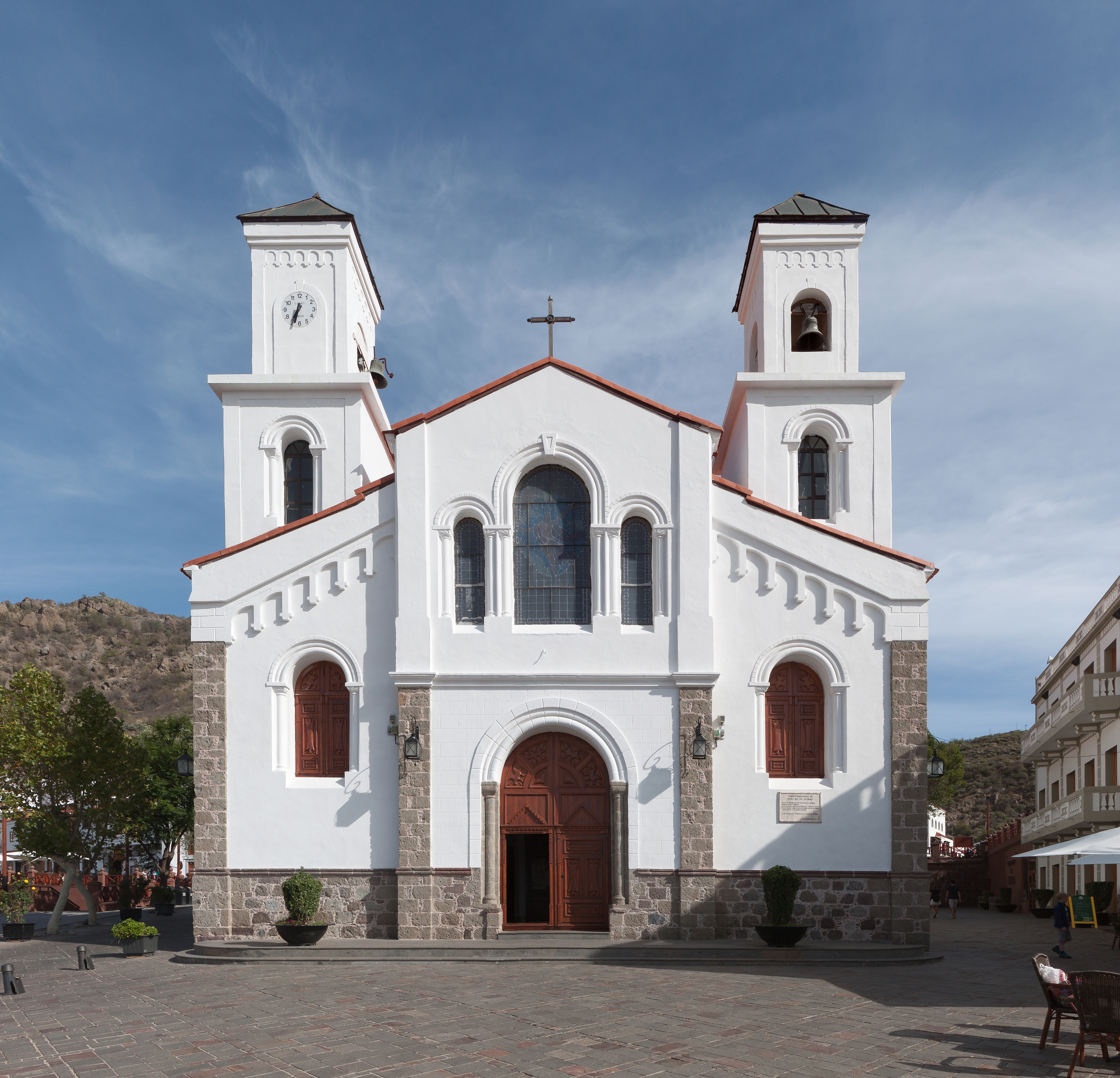
Facade

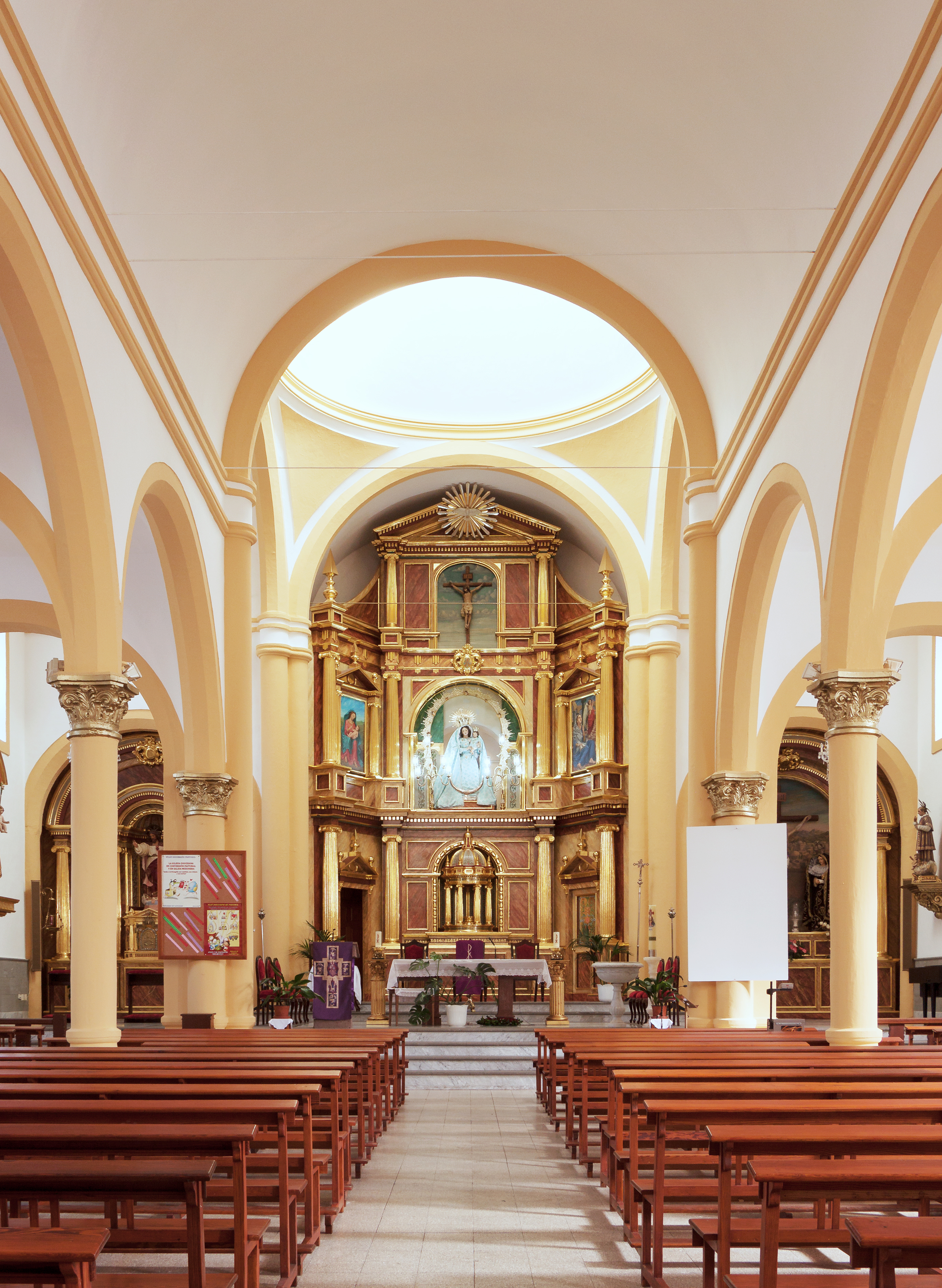
Interior

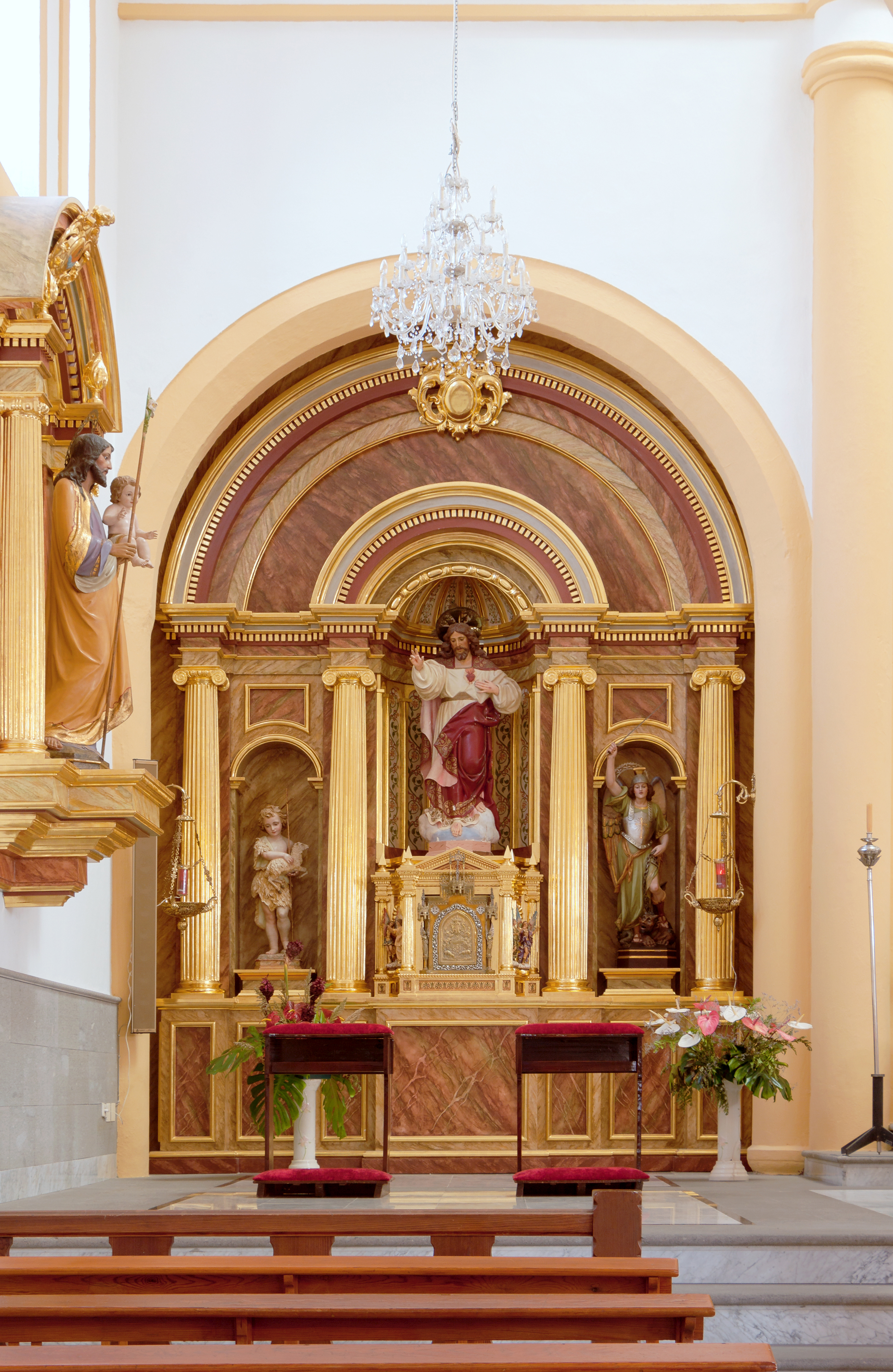
Left side altar

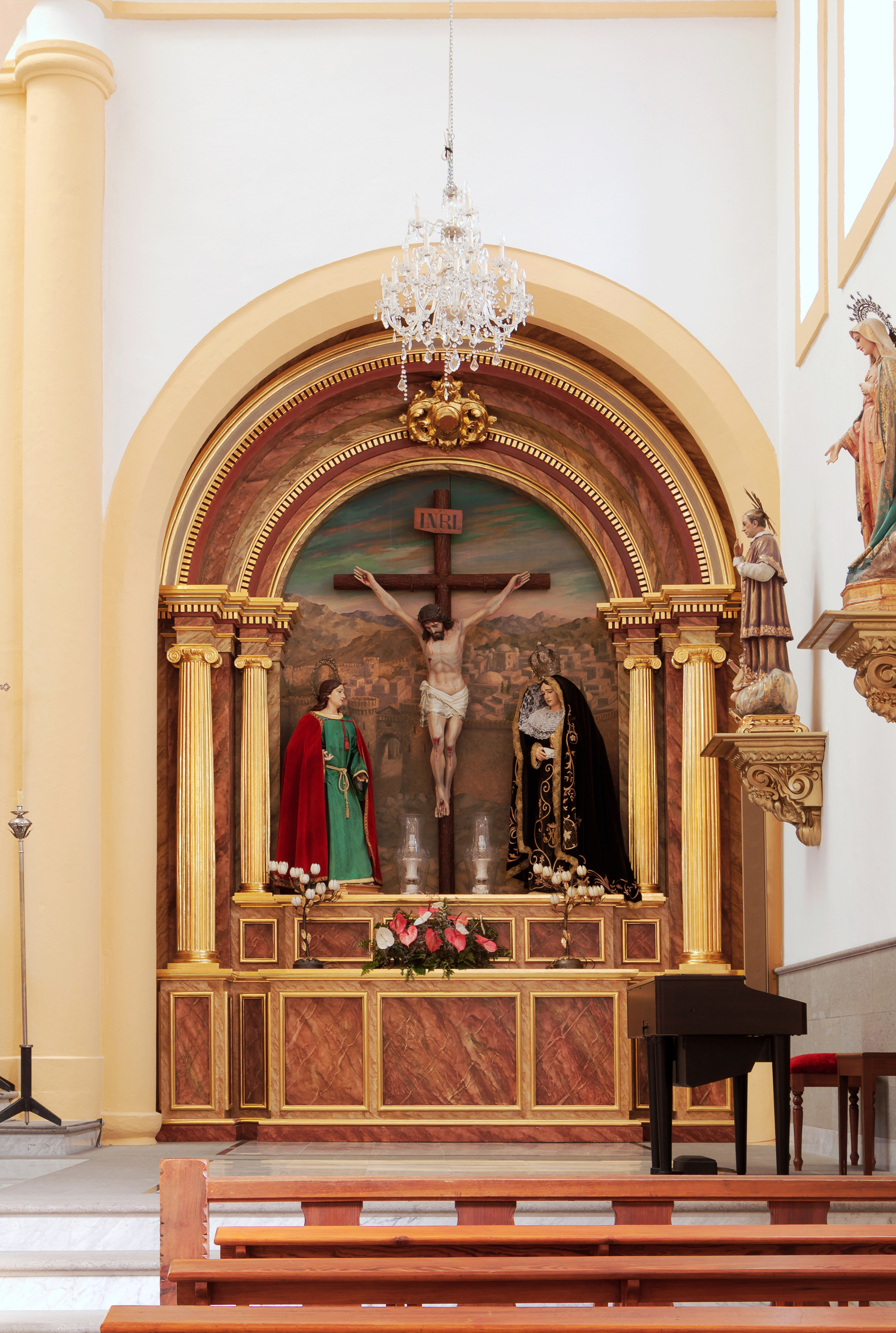
Right side altar

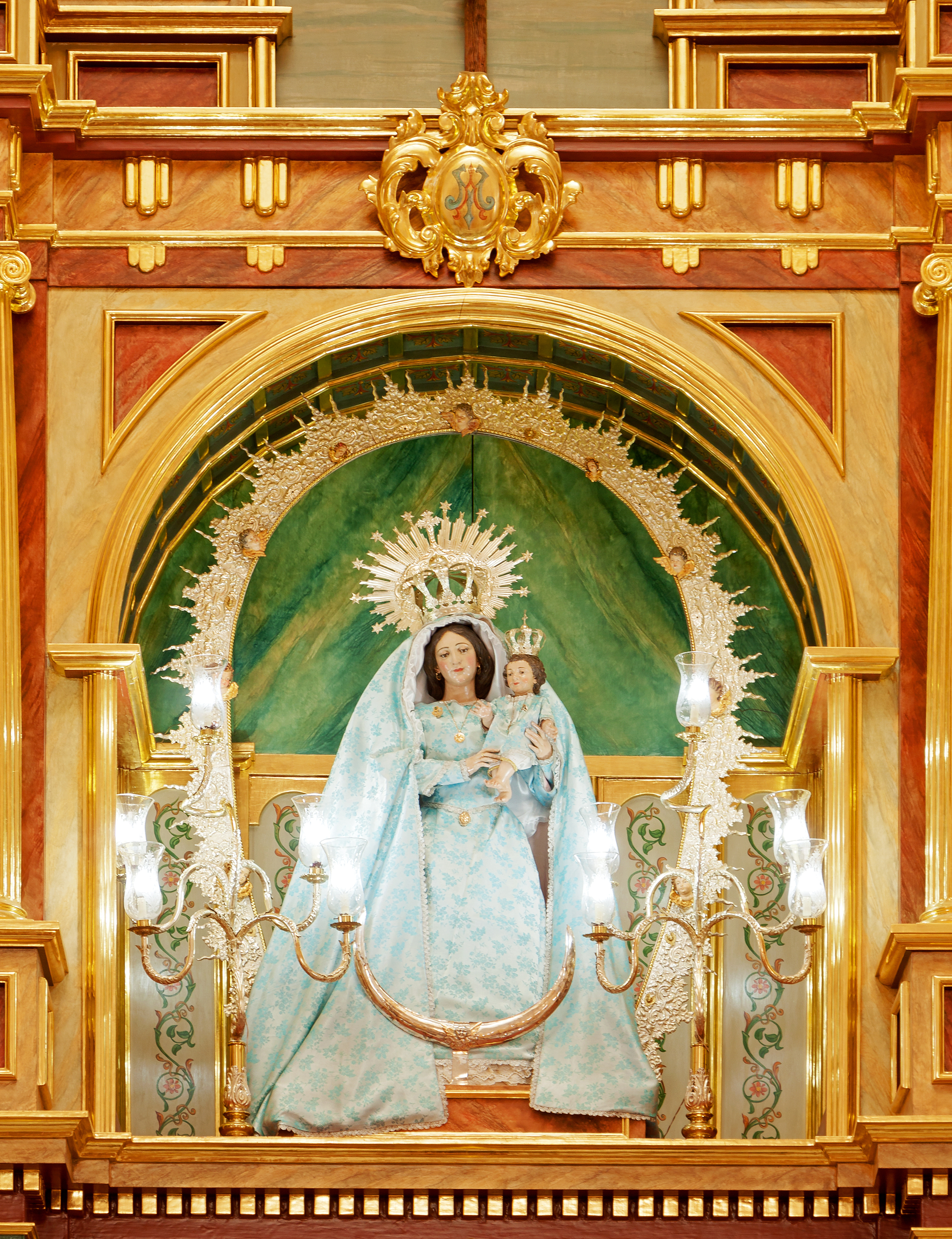
Virgen del Socorro

== Population ==
Its population was 2,028 in 2013.

Historical population

Year	Pop.	±%
1991	2,361	—
1996	2,552	+8.1%
2001	2,400	−6.0%
2002	2,402	+0.1%

Year	Pop.	±%
2003	2,351	−2.1%
2004	2,347	−0.2%
2013	2,028	−13.6%

== Villages ==
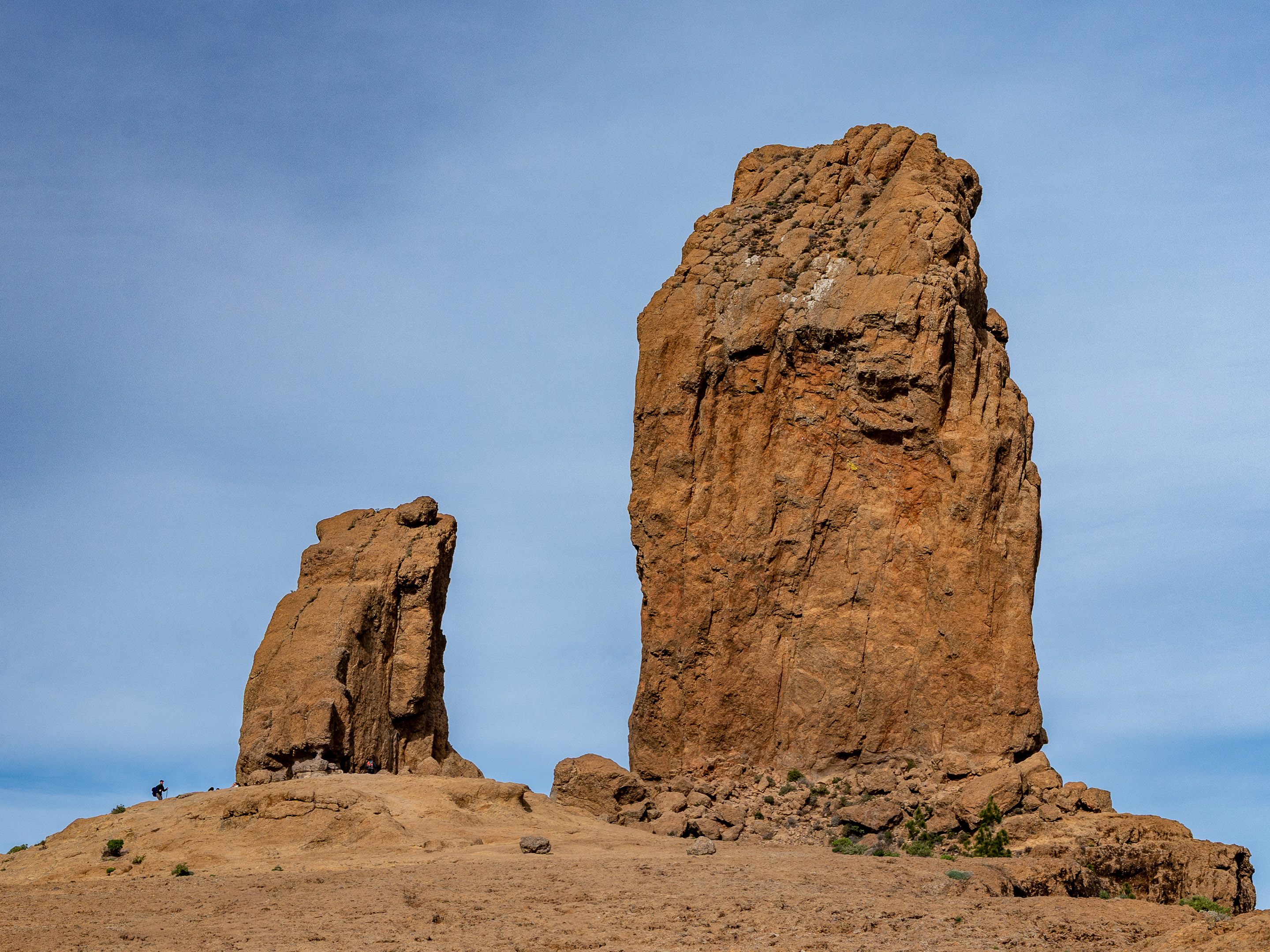
Roque Nublo

- El Carrizal
- La Casa de la Huerta
- Casas del Lomo
- El Chorrillo
- Cuevas Caídas
- La Culata
- La Crucita
- La Cruz Blanca
- La Degollada
- El Espinillo
- El Fondillo
- La Higuerillla
- Juán Gómez
- El Juncal
- Lomito de las Lajas
- Lomo de Los Santos
- El Majuelo
- Peña Rajada
- El Rincón
- El Roque
- La Solana
- Timagada
- La Tosca
- El Toscón

== See also ==
- List of municipalities in Las Palmas
