= Roque Nublo =

Volcanic rock on Gran Canaria

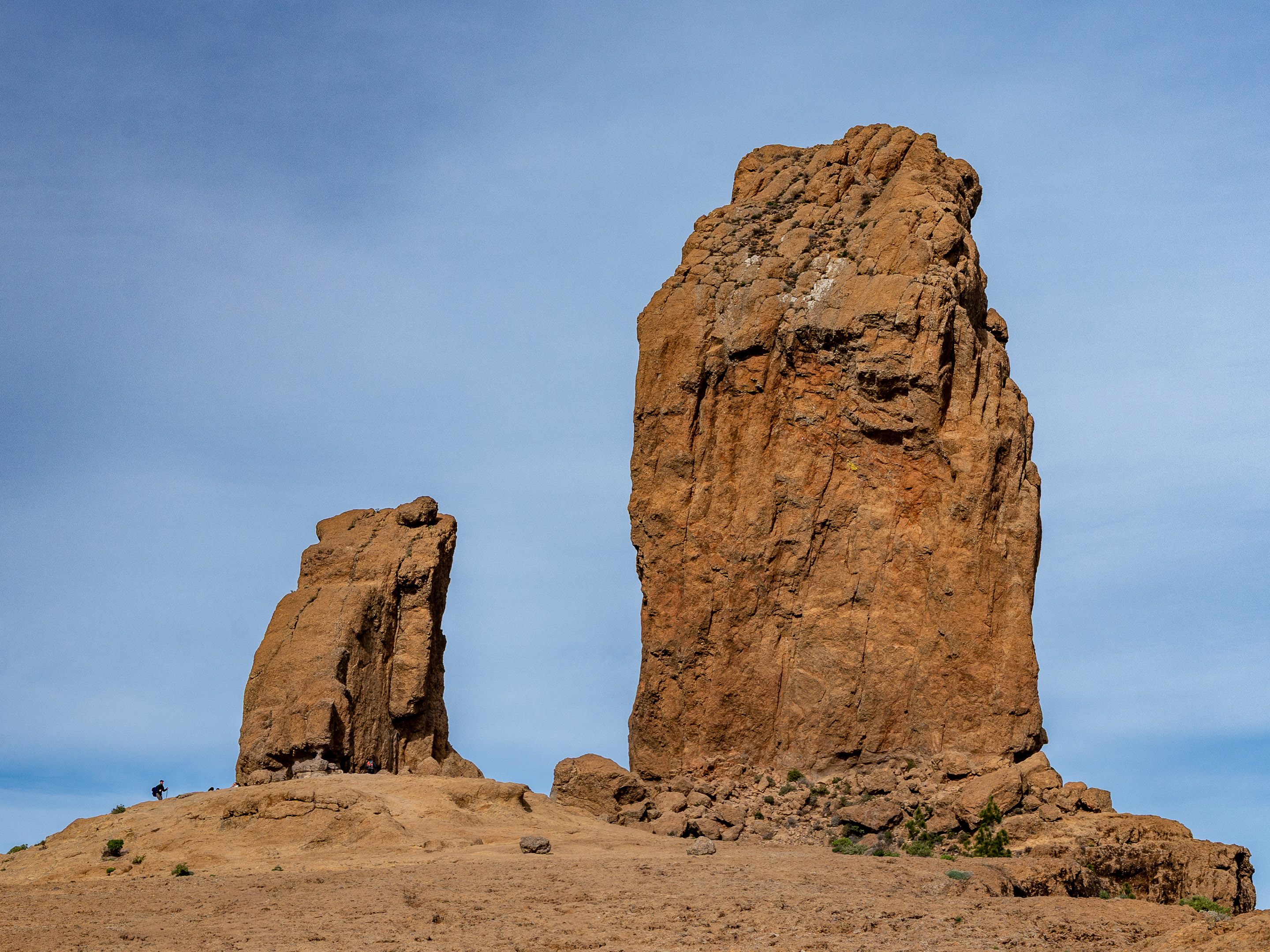
- Roque nublo

- Location within Gran Canaria Location within Canary Islands
- Location: Province of Las Palmas, Gran Canaria, Canary Islands, Spain
- Coordinates: 27°58′15″N 15°36′45″W
- Elevation: 1,813 m (5,948 ft)

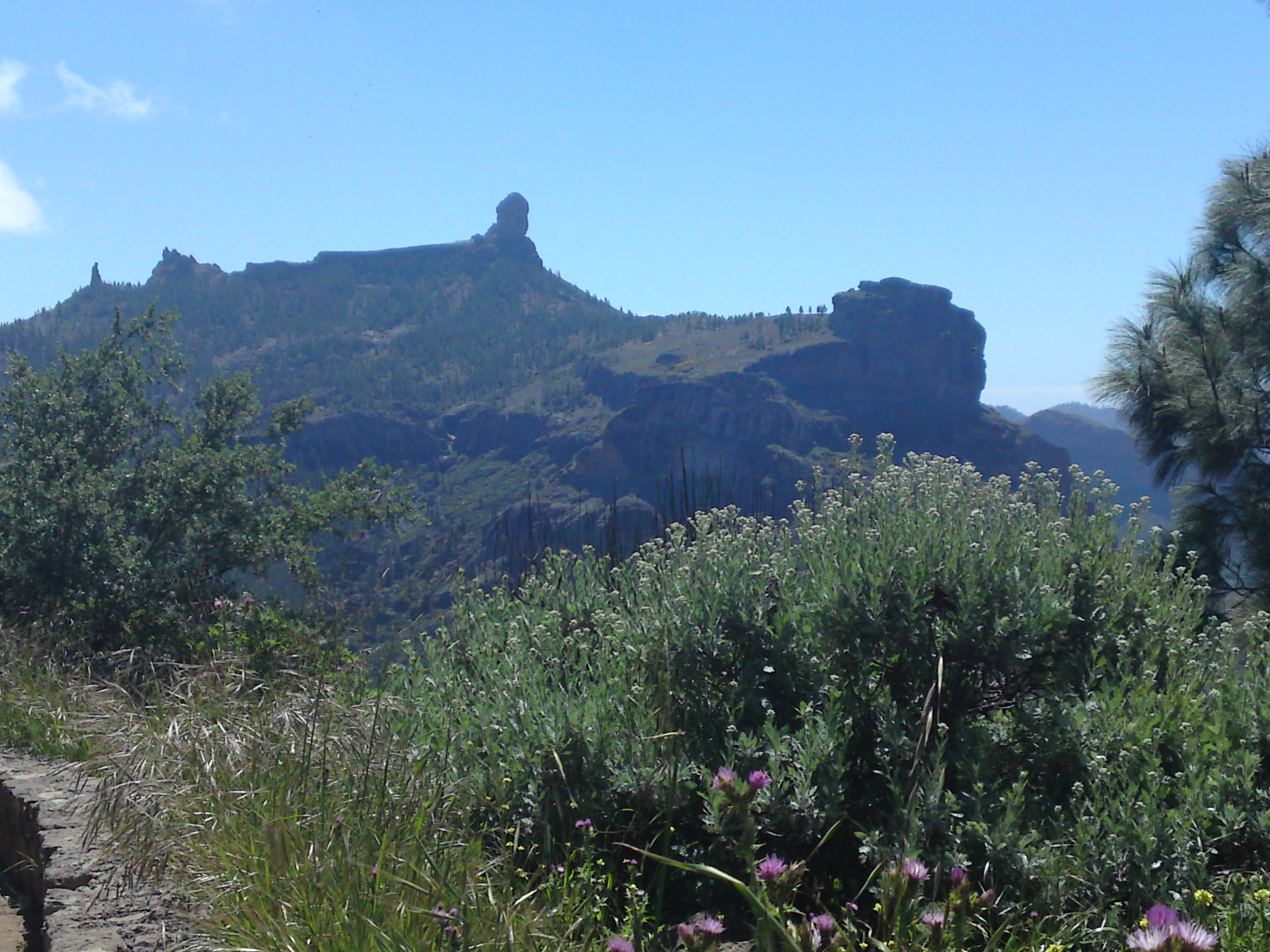
The Roque Nublo seen from the north-east, with the smaller spire (a volcanic plug) known as El Fraile ("the Friar") visible in the far left of the picture.

Roque Nublo (Clouded Rock, Rock in the Clouds) is a volcanic rock on the island of Gran Canaria, Canary Islands, Spain. It is 80 m (262 ft) tall, and its top is 1,813 m (5,948 ft) above sea level. The Roque Nublo is the third highest point on the island of Gran Canaria, after the Morro de la Agujereada at 1,956 m (6,417 ft), and the Pico de las Nieves at 1,949 m (6,394 ft).

It was formed by a volcanic eruption around 4.5 million years ago.

== Location ==
Roque Nublo is in the 260 km^{2} (100 sq mi) Nublo Rural Park, in the Tejeda municipality, near the geographical centre of Gran Canaria. Near to the Roque Nublo are other rock formations, such as the Roque del Fraile and La Rana.
