= Morro de la Agujereada =

Mountain on the Canary Islands

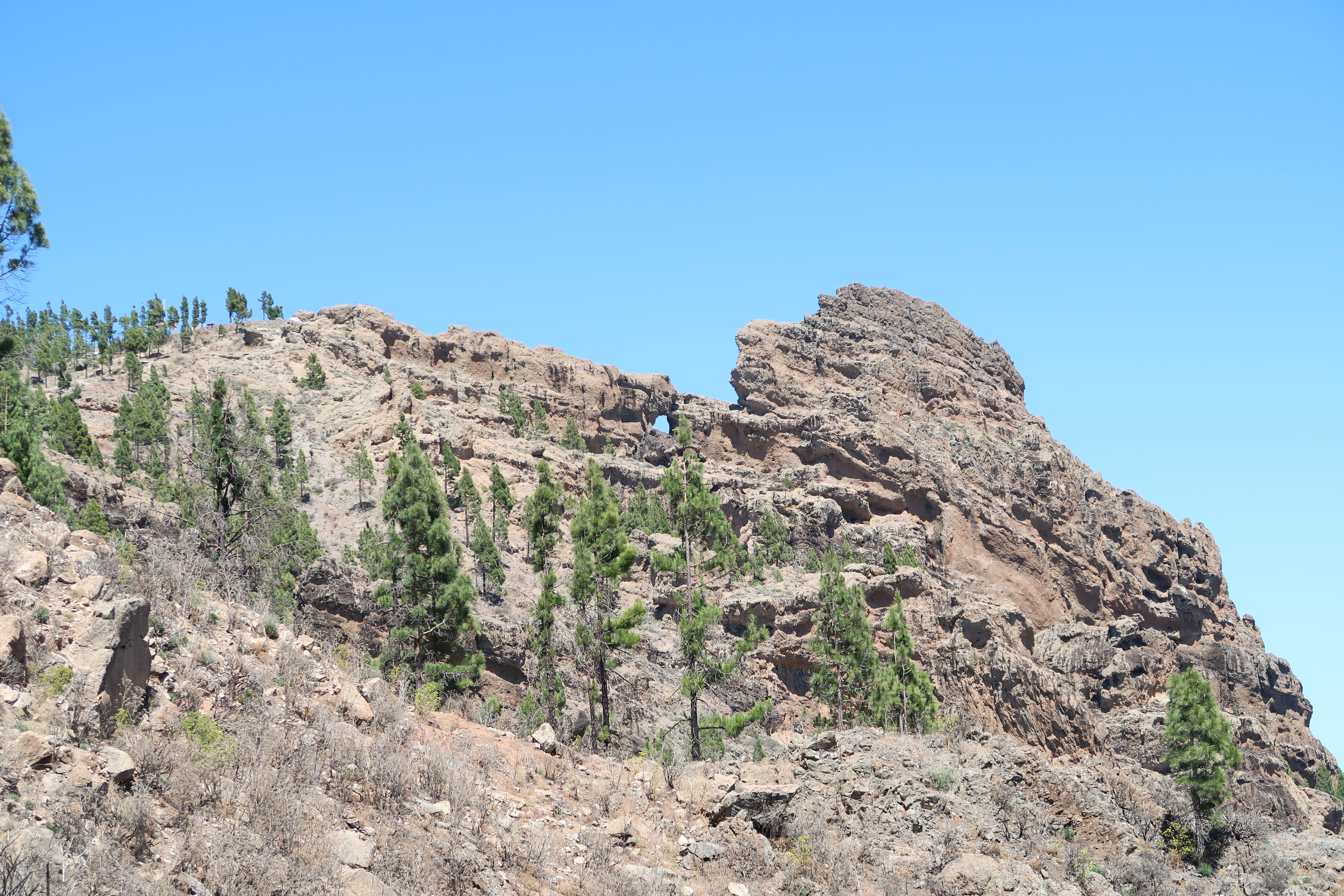
- Morro de la Agujereada in Pico de las Nieves.

Highest point
- Elevation: 1,956 m (6,417 ft)
- Prominence: 1,956 m (6,417 ft)
- Listing: Ultra; Ribu
- Coordinates: 27°57′39″N 15°34′16″W

Geography
- Location within Canary Islands
- Location: Gran Canaria, Canary Islands, Spain

Geology
- Mountain type: Stratovolcano

Morro de la Agujereada is the highest elevation of the island of Gran Canaria, Canary Islands, Spain. Located in Pico de las Nieves, it reaches a height of 1,956 meters above sea level (according to the IGN), being the highest elevation in the province of Las Palmas. Gran Canaria is the third highest island in the Canary Islands, after Tenerife and La Palma.

Although traditionally Pico de las Nieves was considered to be 1,949 meters high, Morro de la Agujereada actually reaches its highest point at 1,956 meters. Morro de la Agujereada is a rocky promontory at the highest point of Pico de las Nieves, whose slopes cover the central area of the summit, and in which numerous snow pits were dug in the past.
