= Attacks on Fuerteventura in 1740 =

Two attacks by English privateers on the Canary island

- Part of War of Jenkins' Ear
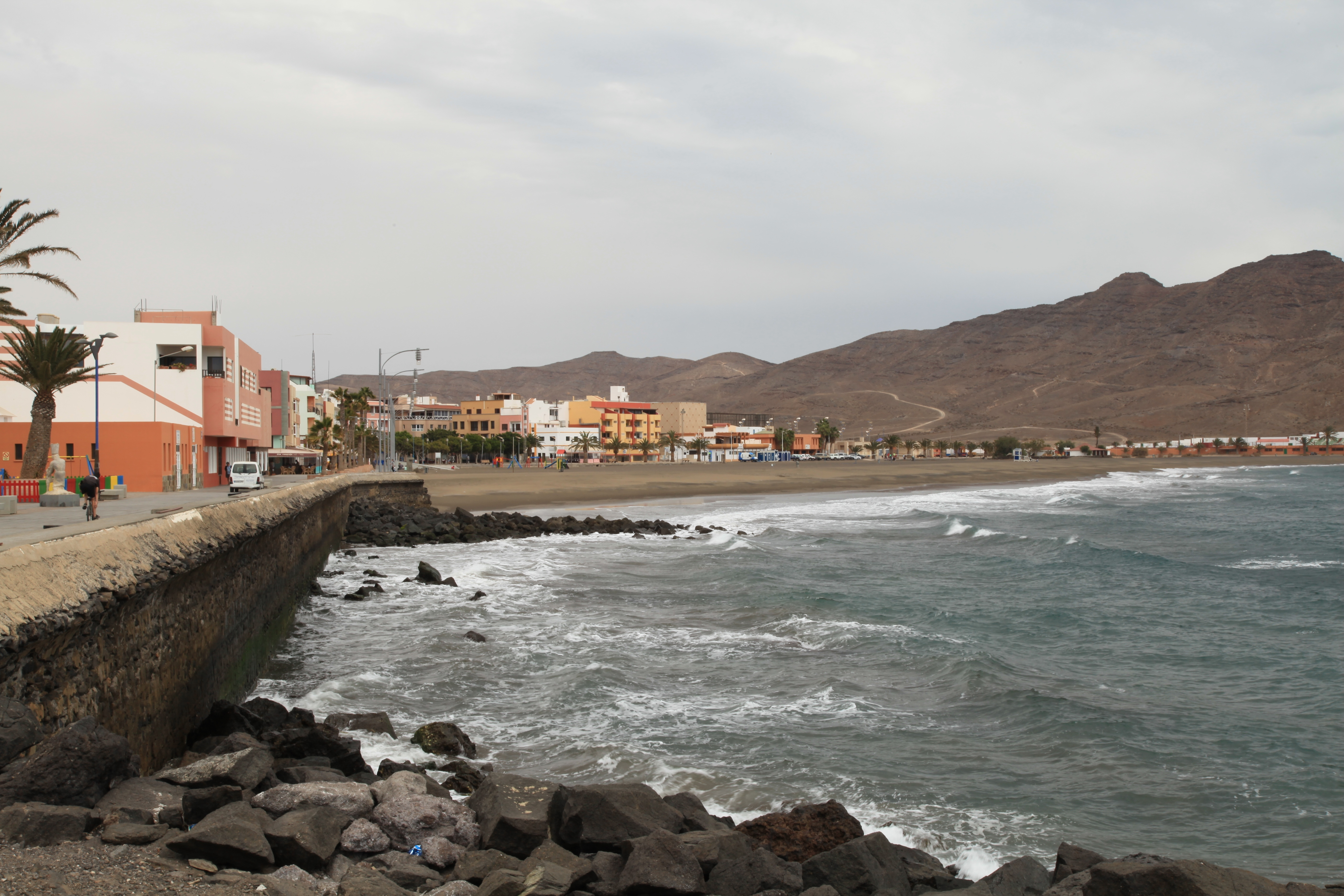
- The bay at Gran Tarajal was used by both privateer expeditions to launch their attack on the island
Date	13 October and 24 November 1740
Location	Fuerteventura, Canary Islands
Result	Spanish victory

Belligerents
(Kingdom of Great Britain) British Empire	(Spain) Spanish Empire

Commanders and leaders
Unknown	José Sánchez Umpiérrez

Units involved
British privateers	Local militia

Strength
100–350	Unknown

Casualties and losses
Most killed	Unknown

The 1740 attacks on the island of Fuerteventura, also known as the Battles of El Cuchillete and Tamasite (Spanish: Batallas de El Cuchillete y Tamasite), by English privateers took place within a month of one another, and were both put down with little trouble by the island's militia. They coincided with the Anglo-Spanish war of 1739. Privateering by the British was common during this conflict and the attacks on Fuerteventura in 1740 can be seen as an extension of this period of discord between Britain and Spain.

== Background and wider war ==
The War of Jenkins' Ear, so called in reference to the severed ear of a British captain, was a conflict between Britain and Spain that lasted from 1739 to 1748. Although the conflict officially ended in 1748, the main engagements were concluded by 1742. Although this article deals only with two such attacks by privateers on one side, privateering occurred on both sides during the conflict.

The attackers to Fuerteventura Island were recruited in New England. In fact, in Boston newspapers it was published in June 1740 that a "large and quality" sloop (corvette), named after Admiral Vernon, was equipped "to go in search of the Spanish".

== Attacks ==
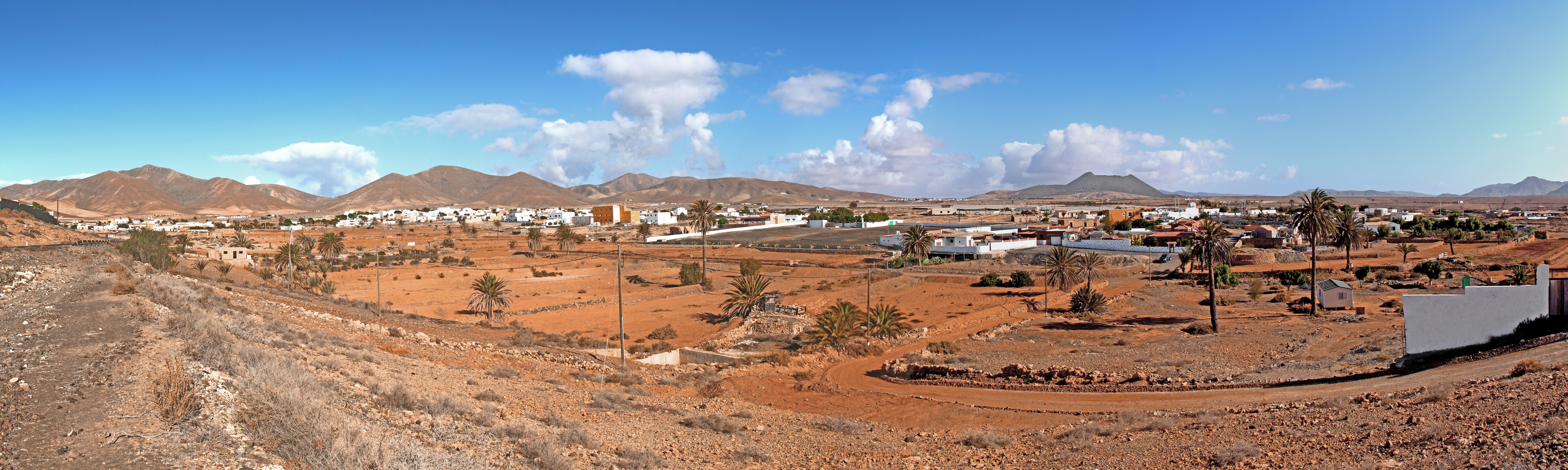
Tuineje- the target of both privateer attacks in 1740

=== First attack ===
The two privateer attacks on Fuerteventura in 1740 occurred within a month of one another. The first involved a band of 50 men who landed in the bay at Gran Tarajal and marched inland to the village of Tuineje. While they looted Tuineje, the privateers were unaware that the island militia were mustering their troops in defence of the island.

This was not the first privateer attack on Fuerteventura, and the island had been fortified against such attacks by towers at Caleta de Fuste and Tostón.

The military commander of the island, Lieutenant Colonel José Sánchez Umpiérrez, and captain Melchor Cabrera Bethencourt led the militia against the invading British privateers. The defence of the island was both brutal and effective; of the 50 privateers, 30 were killed while 20 more were taken prisoner. The islanders, according to George Glas, attacked the invading English with clubs and stones. To shield themselves from the musket fire of the privateers, the locals hid behind a wall of camels. The prisoners were shipped to Tenerife.

=== Second attack ===
The exact time between each attack varies- Glas places it at six weeks, while John Mercer says one month; whatever the precise time that elapsed between each attack, both were carried out in a similar fashion within a short time of one another.

It is thought that the second attack was launched by a larger group of privateers- Glas places the number as 200 to 300 men. Again, as had happened on the first attack, the privateers landed on the bay in Gran Tarajal and again, with drums and banners, marched to the village of Tuineje to loot.

There is a dispute about the exact number of privateers who launched the second attack, and the precise number killed. John Mercer, in his 1973 book on Fuerteventura, says that the locals killed "fifty [privateers] on the spot". This would challenge Glas's claim that 200 to 300 attacked on the second time. Whatever the actual number, it is accepted that the second attack was put down with far more brutality and less pity. It would seem that all involved were killed, with no prisoners taken like on the first attack.

Glas notes in his writings that, owing to the audacity of launching a second attack in such a short time frame, the locals were in no mood to show leniency.

"The natives, enraged to find the island disturbed again in so short a time, determined to give these second invaders no quarter.." - George Glas: The History of the Discovery and Conquest of the Canary Islands.

== Sources ==
- The history of the discovery and conquest of the Canary islands. By Juan de Abreu y Galindo, George Glas
- Ataques ingleses contra Fuerteventura : 1740 (in Spanish)
