= UD Fuerteventura =

Spanish football club

Fuerteventura
- Full name: Unión Deportiva Fuerteventura
- Nickname(s): Fuerte
- Founded: 2004
- Dissolved: 2010
- Ground: Los Pozos, Puerto del Rosario, Canary Islands, Spain
- Capacity: 2,000
- 2009–10: 3ª - Group 12, retired
| Home colours | Away colours |

Unión Deportiva Fuerteventura was a Spanish football team based in Fuerteventura, in the autonomous community of the Canary Islands. Founded in 2004 and dissolved in 2010, it played its last season (2009–10) in Tercera División, and held home games at Estadio Los Pozos, with a capacity of 2,000 spectators.

== History ==
Club Deportivo Corralejo was founded in 1975. In 2004, as the Canary Islands team was playing in Segunda División B, it merged with Club Deportivo Fuerteventura (born in 1987) to create Unión Deportiva Fuerteventura.

The new club started also in level three, after taking Corralejo's berth, but was relegated immediately. In 2007–08, again in the third category, Fuerteventura achieved its best-ever position as third, but lost in the promotion playoffs to Alicante CF (0–3 on aggregate).

In the following season, although the club finished above the relegation zone, it was nonetheless relegated for failing to pay its players, and folded soon after.

For 2010–11, Fuerteventura tried to compete in the first regional division, taking the reserve team's license, but the club was finally dissolved due to the lack of funds.

== Season to season ==
| Season | Tier | Division | Place | Copa del Rey |
|---|---|---|---|---|
| 2004–05 | 3 | 2ª B | 17th | |
| 2005–06 | 4 | 3ª | 1st | |
| 2006–07 | 4 | 3ª | 4th | First round |
| 2007–08 | 3 | 2ª B | 3rd | |
| 2008–09 | 3 | 2ª B | 15th | First round |
| 2009–10 | 4 | 3ª | (R) | |

- 3 seasons in Segunda División B
- 3 seasons in Tercera División

== Notable players ==
- (Spain) Miguel Alfonso
- (Chinese Taipei) Yaki Yen
