= Yaki Yen =

Taiwanese footballer

Yaki Yen 殷亞吉
Personal information
- Full name: Yaki Aithany Yen Tavio
- Date of birth: 21 April 1989 (age 37)
- Place of birth: Puerto del Rosario, Spain
- Height: 1.84 m (6 ft 1/2 in)
- Position: Centre-back

Team information
- Current team: El Cotillo

Senior career*
Years	Team	Apps	(Gls)
2008–2010	Fuerteventura	19	(0)
2010	Lucena	?	(?)
2010	Atlético Granadilla	?	(?)
2010–2013	UD Pájara Playas de Jandía	1	(0)
2013–2014	El Cotillo	?	(?)
2016–2017	Changchun Yatai	23	(0)
2018–2020	Qingdao Huanghai	61	(5)
2021–2022	Wuhan Three Towns	48	(1)
2023	Nanjing City	22	(0)
2024	Chongqing Tonglianglong	21	(1)
2025-	El Cotillo		

International career^{‡}
2015–2018	Chinese Taipei	14	(1)
- * Club domestic league appearances and goals as of 24 February 2024 ‡ National team caps and goals as of 27 March 2018

Yaki Aithany Yen Tavio (Chinese: 殷亞吉, born 21 April 1989) is a professional footballer who currently plays as a centre-back. Born in Spain, he has represented the Chinese Taipei national team.

== Club career ==
Yen started his career in Spain with his local outfit Fuerteventura in the 2008–09 Segunda División B season. After two seasons he moved to Lucena, before having spells at other lower league clubs in Atlético Granadilla and UD Pájara Playas de Jandía. With the financial difficulties and the disbandment of UD Pájara Playas de Jandía, he went on trial with El Cotillo.

On 22 September 2015 he went on trial for Changchun Yatai F.C., and on 31 December, he signed a 5-year contract with the club. He made his debut in a league game on 6 March 2016 against Hangzhou Greentown. After two seasons with the club, on 28 February 2018, Yen transferred to China League One side Qingdao Huanghai. He was part of the team that won the 2019 China League One division title and promotion to the top tier.

On 2 April 2021 he transferred to second-tier club Wuhan Three Towns. He established himself as a regular within the team that went on to win the division title and promotion as the club entered the top tier for the first time in their history. In the following campaign, they won the 2022 Chinese Super League title.

On 5 April 2023, Yen joined China League One club Nanjing City. On 24 February 2024, he joined fellow China League One club Chongqing Tonglianglong.

== International career ==
Yen is eligible for Taiwanese citizenship due to his father being a citizen. In 2015, he officially received his citizenship and made his debut in a World Cup Qualification match against Iraq on 9 September 2015 in Tehran. He scored his first international goal against Thailand during the World Cup Qualification match on 12 November in Bangkok. Yen left the national team in September 2016, citing disagreements with coach Toshiaki Imai. However, after Imai left his role in charge of the national team, Yen accepted a call-up from caretaker boss Kazuo Kuroda in May 2017.

== Personal life ==
Yen was born in the city of Puerto del Rosario, Spain, to a Taiwanese father and a Spanish mother.

== Career statistics ==
=== Club ===
As of match played 26 October 2024.

Appearances and goals by club, season and competition
Club	Season	League			National Cup		Continental		Other		Total	
Club	Season	Division	Apps	Goals	Apps	Goals	Apps	Goals	Apps	Goals	Apps	Goals
Fuerteventura	2008–09	Segunda División B	11	0		0	—		—		11	0
Fuerteventura	2009–10	Tercera División	8	0	—		—		—		8	0
Fuerteventura	Total		19	0	0	0	—		—		19	0
Lucena	2009–10	Segunda División B			—		—		—			
Atlético Granadilla	2010–11	Tercera División			—		—		—			
UD Pájara Playas de Jandía	2010–11	Tercera División	1	0	—		—		—		1	0
El Cotillo	2013–14	Tercera División			—		—		—			
Changchun Yatai	2016	Chinese Super League	17	0	1	0	—		—		18	0
Changchun Yatai	2017	Chinese Super League	6	0	0	0	—		—		6	0
Changchun Yatai	Total		23	0	1	0	—		—		24	0
Qingdao Huanghai	2018	China League One	23	3	0	0	—		—		23	3
Qingdao Huanghai	2019	China League One	24	2	0	0	—		—		24	2
Qingdao Huanghai	2020	Chinese Super League	14	0	1	0	—		—		15	0
Qingdao Huanghai	Total		61	5	1	0	—		—		62	5
Wuhan Three Towns	2021	China League One	30	1	0	0	—		—		30	1
Wuhan Three Towns	2022	Chinese Super League	18	0	0	0	—		—		18	0
Wuhan Three Towns	Total		48	1	0	0	—		—		48	1
Nanjing City	2023	China League One	22	0	0	0	—		—		22	0
Chongqing Tonglianglong	2024	China League One	21	1	0	0	—		—		21	1
Career total			195	7	2	0	0	0	0	0	197	7

=== International ===
As of match played 27 March 2018

National team	Year	Apps	Goals
Chinese Taipei	2015	5	1
Chinese Taipei	2016	1	0
Chinese Taipei	2017	7	0
Chinese Taipei	2018	1	0
Total		14	1

Scores and results list Chinese Taipei's goal tally first.

#	Date	Venue	Opponent	Score	Result	Competition
1.	12 November 2015	Rajamangala Stadium, Bangkok, Thailand	Thailand	1–1	2–4	2018 FIFA World Cup qualification

== Honours ==
Qingdao Huanghai

- China League One: 2019

Wuhan Three Towns

- Chinese Super League: 2022
- China League One: 2021
