= CD Herbania =

Spanish football club

Herbania
- Full name: Club Deportivo Herbania
- Founded: August 1945; 81 years ago
- Ground: Los Pozos, Puerto del Rosario, Fuerteventura, Canary Islands, Spain
- Capacity: 2,000
- President: Inma Díaz Guerra
- Head coach: Nauzet Cruz
- League: Interinsular Preferente
- 2025–26: Tercera Federación – Group 12, 16th of 18 (relegated)
Home colours	Away colours

Club Deportivo Herbania is a Spanish football team based in Puerto del Rosario, in the autonomous community of Canary Islands. Founded in 1945, it plays in Interinsular Preferente, holding home matches at Estadio Municipal de Los Pozos, with a capacity of 2,000 people.

== Season to season ==
Season	Tier	Division	Place	Copa del Rey
1945–1980	—	Regional	—	
1980–81	8	3ª Reg.	15th	
1981–82	8	3ª Reg.	3rd	
1982–83	8	3ª Reg.	6th	
1983–84	7	2ª Reg.	8th	
1984–85	7	2ª Reg.	11th	
1985–86	6	1ª Reg.	2nd	
1986–87	6	1ª Reg.		
1987–88	6	1ª Reg.	3rd	
1988–89	6	1ª Reg.		
1989–90	6	1ª Reg.		
1990–91	6	1ª Reg.	11th	
1991–92	6	1ª Reg.		
1992–2004	DNP			
2004–05	6	1ª Reg.	1st	
2005–06	5	Int. Pref.	8th	
2006–07	5	Int. Pref.	8th	
2007–2017	DNP			
2017–18	6	1ª Reg.	6th	
2018–19	6	1ª Reg.	2nd	

Season	Tier	Division	Place	Copa del Rey
2019–20	6	1ª Reg.	1st	
2020–21	5	Int. Pref.	1st	
2021–22	5	3ª RFEF	13th	
2022–23	6	Int. Pref.	2nd	
2023–24	5	3ª Fed.	13th	
2024–25	5	3ª Fed.	12th	
2025–26	5	3ª Fed.		

- 4 seasons in Tercera Federación/Tercera División RFEF
