= Torre del Tostón =

Defense tower in el Cotillo, Fuerteventura, Spain

Coordinates: 28°40′47.92″N 14°0′38.15″W

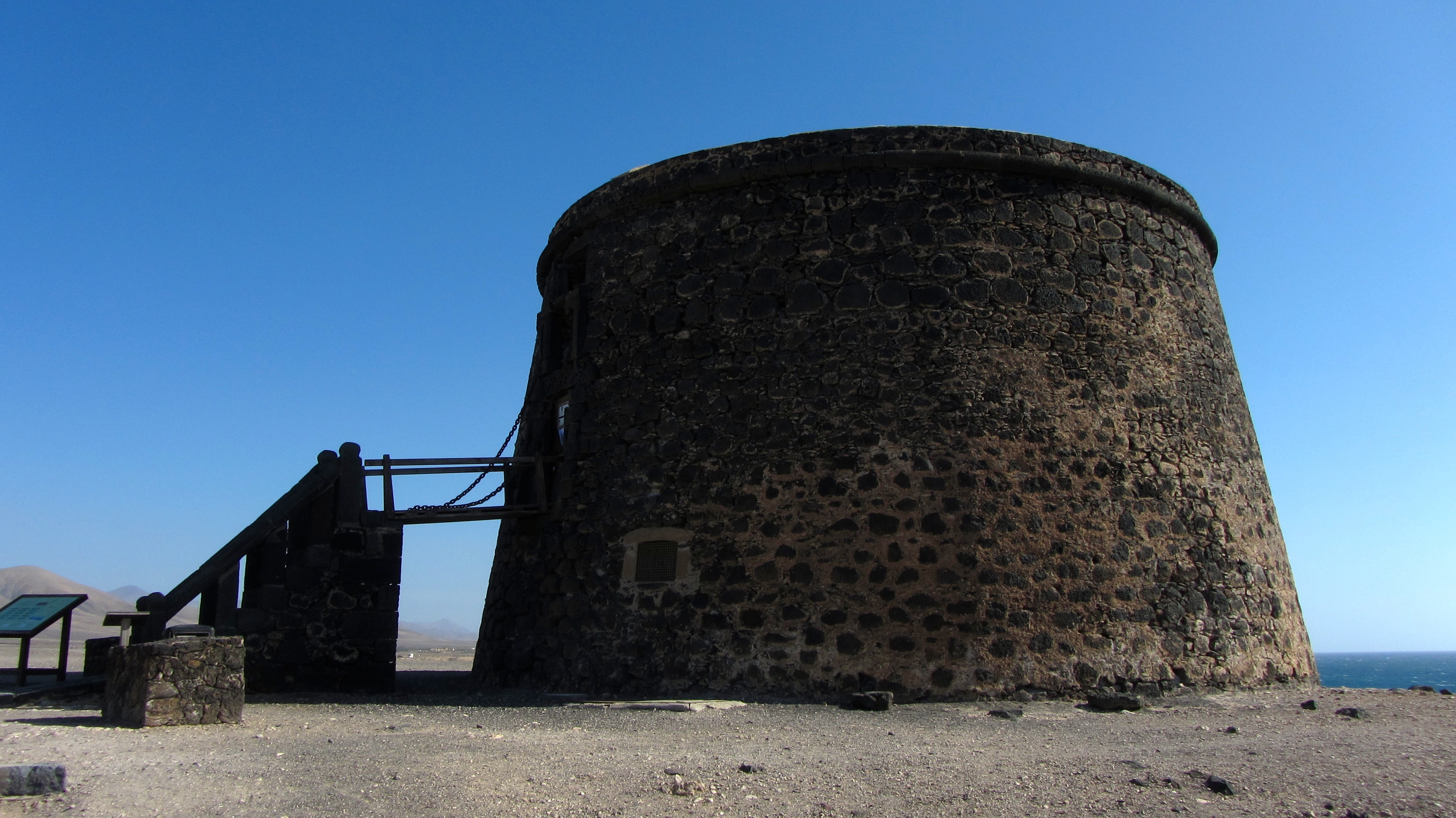
Torre del Tostón

Defense tower “Torre del Tostón” (or "Castillo de El Cotillo") is located in the coastal town of el Cotillo, which forms part of the municipality of la Oliva, Fuerteventura, Spain. This defense tower was recognized as historic-artistic monument in 1949. Nowadays, famous local artists use Torre del Tostón as exhibition room, and it's one of the island's main tourist destinations, including as viewpoint.

== History ==
French explorer Jean de Bethencourt created the first defense tower, known as "el Castillo de Rico Roque", during the first years of the colonization of the Canary Islands. Military engineer Claudio de L'Isle built a new one on the ruins of the previous defense tower around 1700, which was named "Torre de Nuestra Señora del Pilar y San Miguel". This defense tower consisted of two floors, and three iron cannons that were used to defend the coast and boats moored in the port of el Costillo against pirates who operated from France, England and North Africa (Barbary pirates).

== Identical towers ==
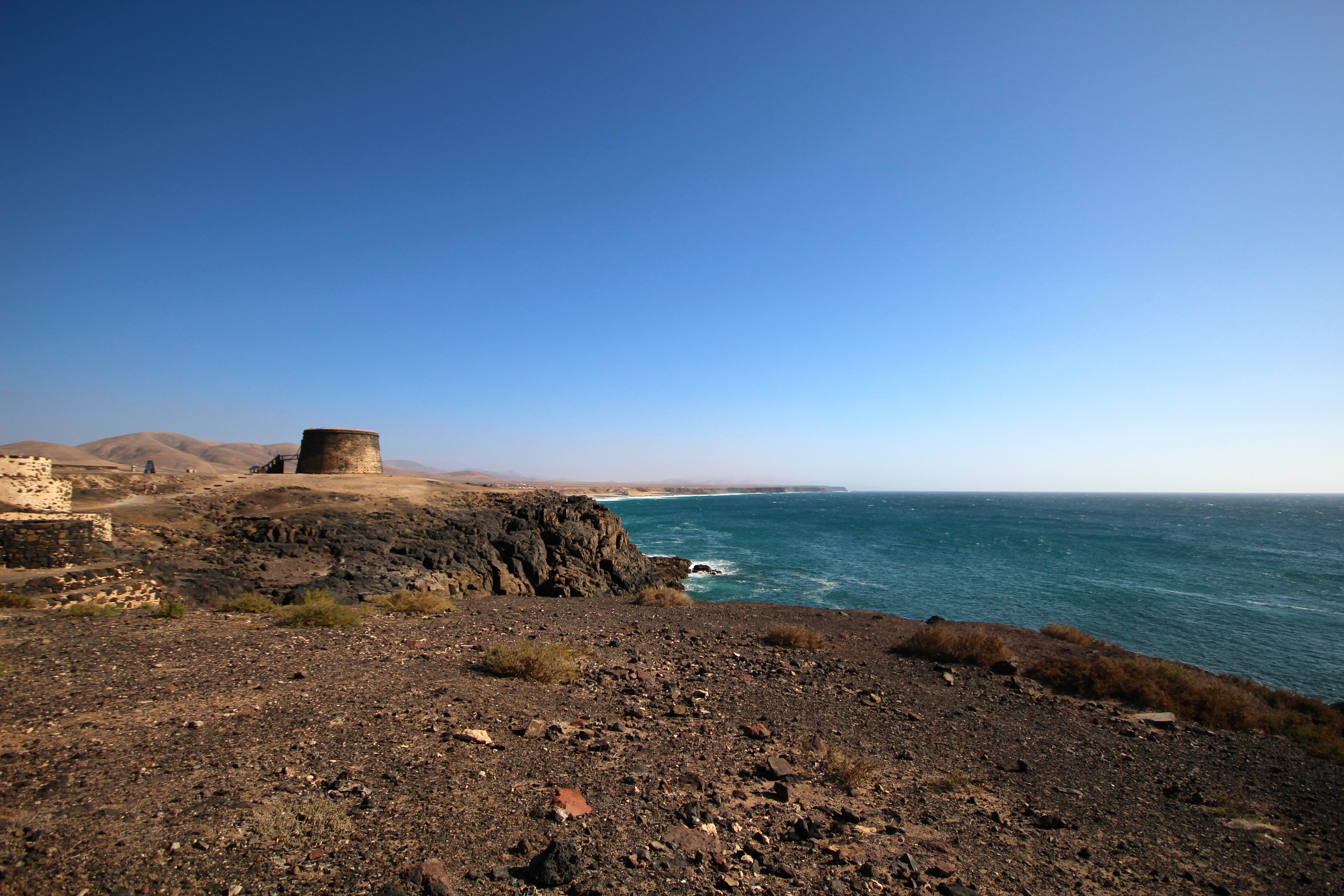
Torre del Tostón

The archipelago of the Canary Islands features a certain number of defense towers situated on various corners, which have the same structure and identical characteristics. It was added to the list of Spanish cultural heritage (“Bien de Interés Cultural”) in 1949.
Torre del Tostón is almost identical to the following castles/ towers:

- Torre de San André (Tenerife)
- Torre de Gando (Gran Canaria)
- Torreón de San Pedro Mártir (Gran Canaria)
- Castillo de San Buenaventura (Fuerteventura)
- Castillo de las Coloradas (Lanzarote)
