= CD Unión Puerto =

Spanish football club

Unión Puerto
- Full name: Club Deportivo La Cuadra-Unión Puerto del Rosario
- Founded: 1991 (as CD La Cuadra)
- Ground: Los Pozos, Puerto del Rosario, Fuerteventura, Canary Islands, Spain
- Capacity: 2,000
- President: Esteban Saavedra
- Manager: José Juan Almeida
- League: Interinsular Preferente
- 2025–26: Interinsular Preferente, 9th of 19
Home colours	Away colours

Club Deportivo La Cuadra-Unión Puerto del Rosario, known as Unión Puerto or sometimes as La Cuadra, is a Spanish football team based in Puerto del Rosario, in the autonomous community of Canary Islands. Founded in 1991, they play in Interinsular Preferente, holding home matches at Estadio Municipal de Los Pozos, with a capacity of 2,000 people.

== Honours ==
Founded in 1991 as Club Deportivo La Cuadra, the club was renamed Club Deportivo Risco Prieto in 1998, and again changed name to Club Deportivo Unión Puerto del Rosario in 2003. In June 2015, they achieved a first-ever promotion to Tercera División.

In 2020, Unión Puerto was renamed Club Deportivo La Cuadra-Unión Puerto del Rosario.

== Season to season ==
Season	Tier	Division	Place	Copa del Rey
1992–93	7	2ª Reg.	3rd	
1993–94	7	2ª Reg.	5th	
1994–95	7	2ª Reg.		
1995–96	7	2ª Reg.		
1996–97	6	1ª Reg.		
1997–98	6	1ª Reg.		
1998–99	6	1ª Reg.	13th	
1999–2000	6	1ª Reg.	10th	
2000–01	6	1ª Reg.	6th	
2001–02	6	1ª Reg.	9th	
2002–03	6	1ª Reg.	7th	
2003–04	6	1ª Reg.	11th	
2004–05	6	1ª Reg.	10th	
2005–06	6	1ª Reg.	2nd	
2006–07	6	1ª Reg.	8th	
2007–08	6	1ª Reg.	14th	
2008–09	6	1ª Reg.	2nd	
2009–10	6	1ª Reg.	3rd	
2010–11	6	1ª Reg.	2nd	
2011–12	5	Int. Pref.	7th	

Season	Tier	Division	Place	Copa del Rey
2012–13	5	Int. Pref.	7th	
2013–14	5	Int. Pref.	11th	
2014–15	5	Int. Pref.	2nd	
2015–16	4	3ª	16th	
2016–17	4	3ª	9th	
2017–18	4	3ª	17th	
2018–19	4	3ª	15th	
2019–20	4	3ª	11	
2020–21	4	3ª	7th / 1st	
2021–22	5	3ª RFEF	9th	
2022–23	5	3ª Fed.	13th	
2023–24	5	3ª Fed.	18th	
2024–25	6	Int. Pref.	14th	
2025–26	6	Int. Pref.		

- 6 seasons in Tercera División
- 3 seasons in Tercera Federación/Tercera División RFEF
