= Casa de los Coroneles =

Historic building in the Canary Islands

Coordinates: 28.6066°N 13.9252°W

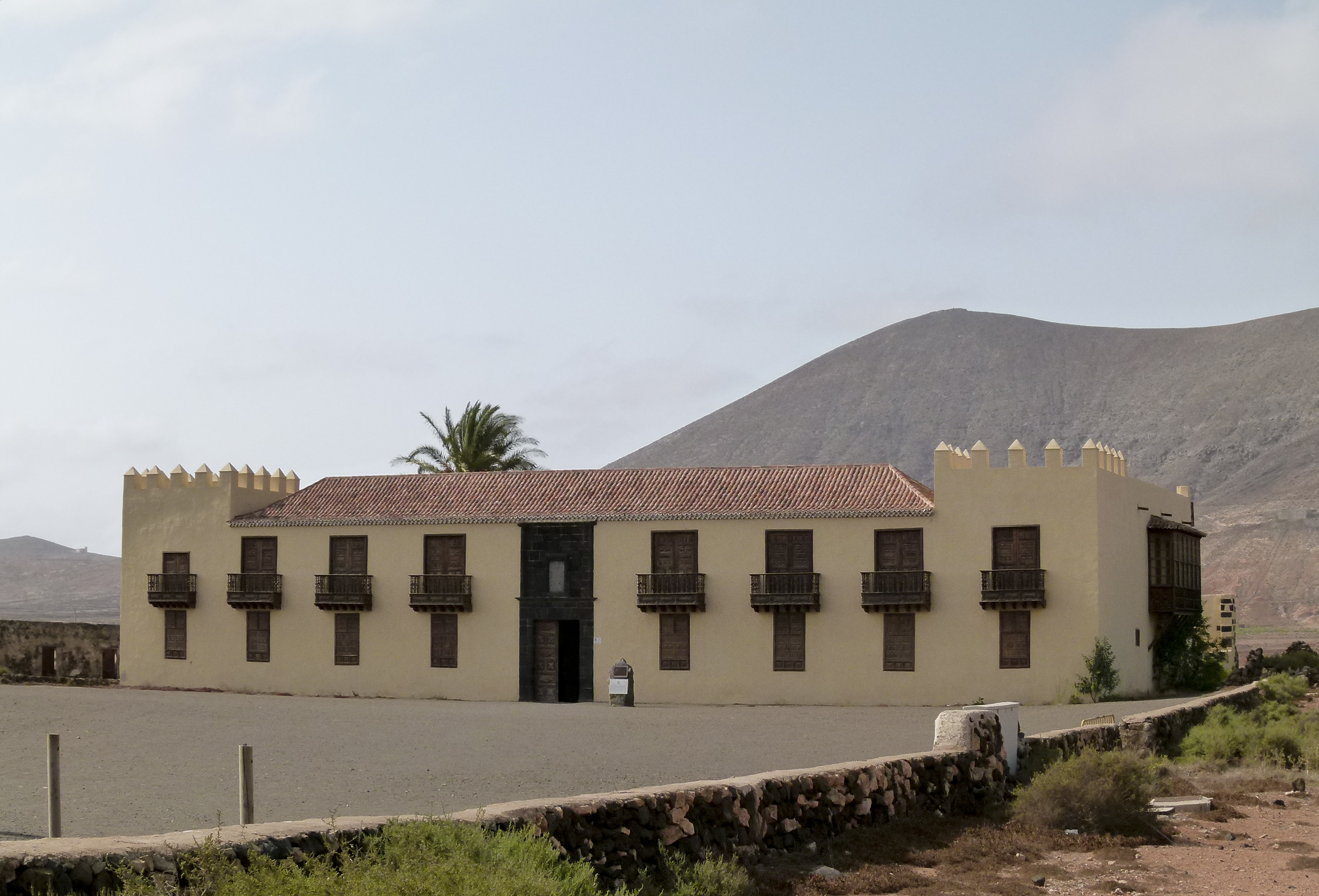
Casa de los Coroneles

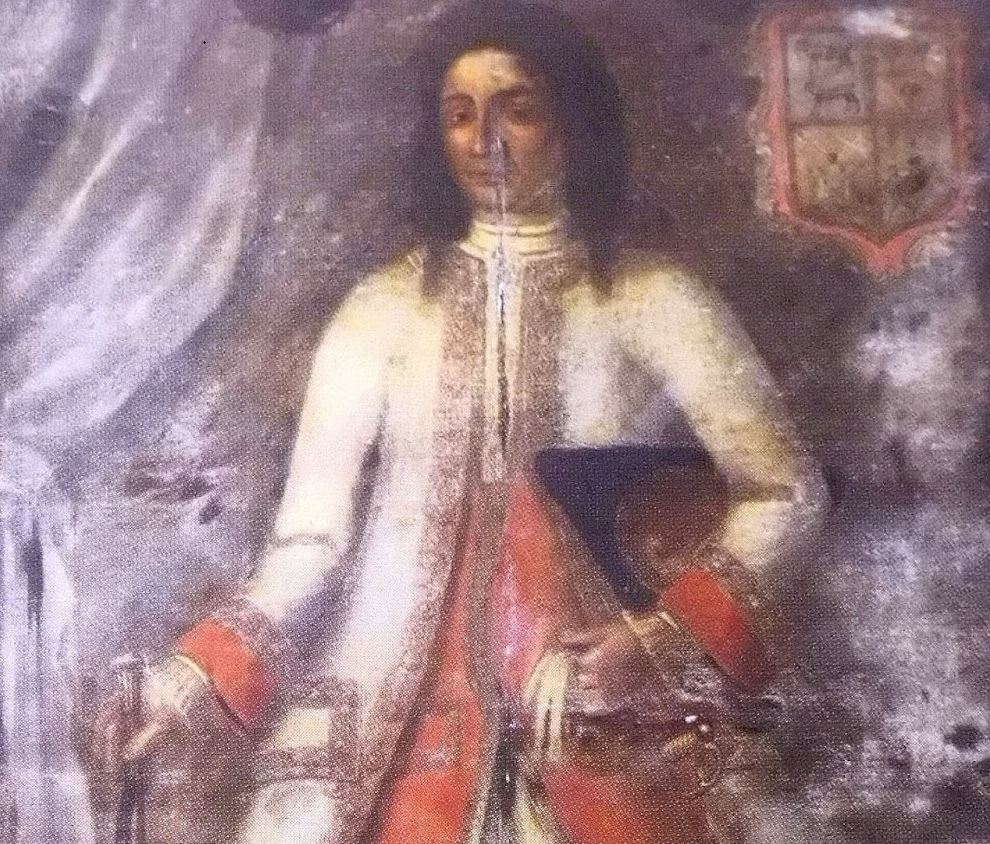
Col. Melchor Cabrera Bethencourt, colonel at the time the house was constructed

Casa de los Coroneles is an historic building in La Oliva, Canary Islands, Spain, on the island of Fuerteventura. It was once the seat of the island's incumbent colonel and now houses an art gallery.

== History ==
Although little solid historical information exists about Casa de los Coroneles, it is believed it was constructed in 1740, under the authority of Colonel Melchor de Cabrera Bethencourt.

== Construction style ==
Casa de los Coroneles was built in a Canarian-Andalusian style. On its imposing northern facade there are eight windows on the ground floor and eight more on the upper level. In keeping with traditional Canarian architecture, each upper window has a wooden balcony.

Built in the 18th century, when many of the island's residents would not have had a single window in their dwellings, the sight of the sixteen on the main facade of the manor would have been a statement of the authority and wealth of those who resided within. Many features of the home are designed to send out a message of power. The twin battlements on either side of the main facade would not have held any practical military purpose, but would have been added to the house as another statement of political dominance.
