= El Cotillo =

Coastal town in the Province of Las Palmas, Canary Islands, Spain

Coordinates: 28.6839°N 14.0104°W

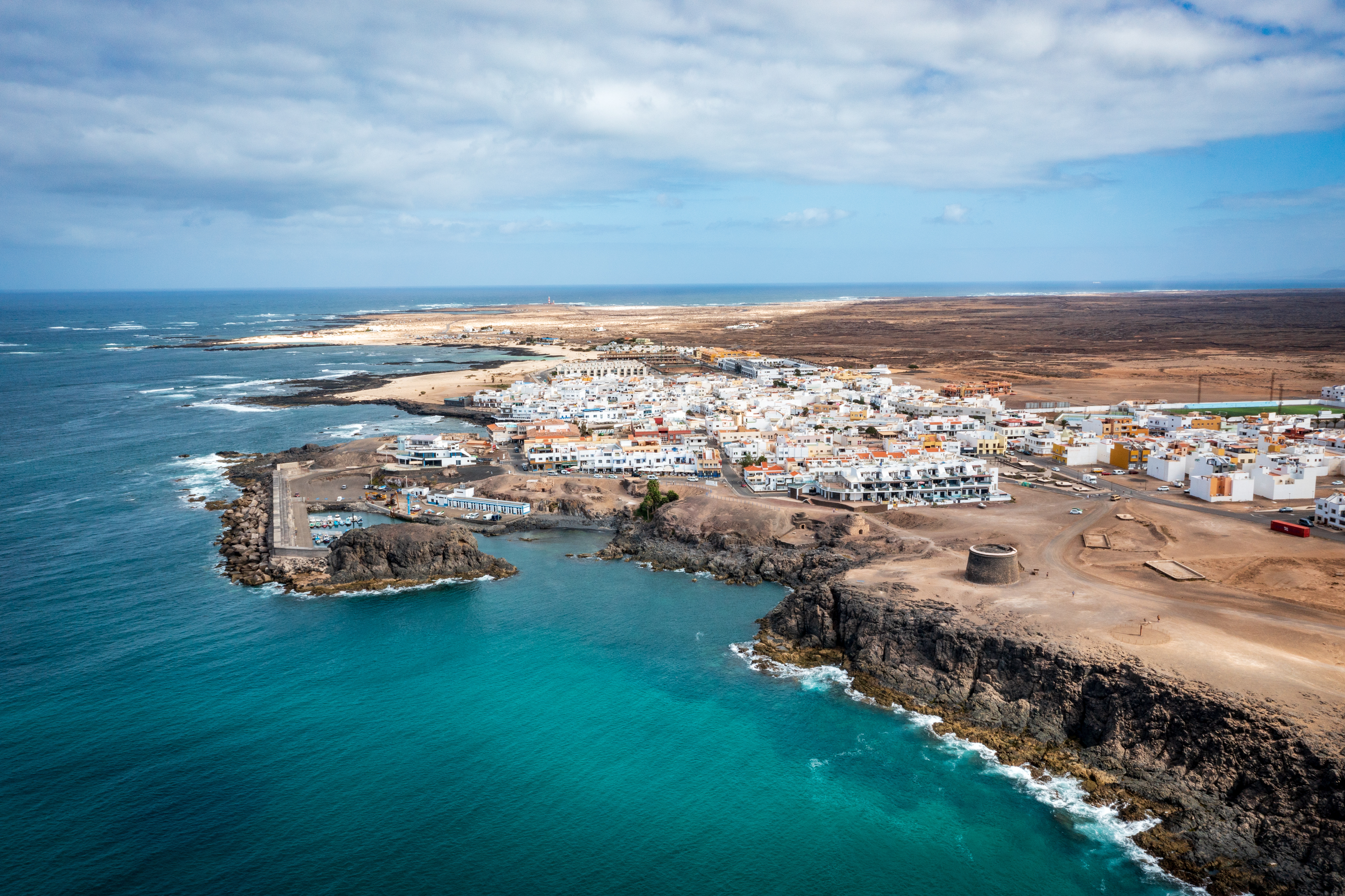
Seaside view of el Cotillo

El Cotillo is a coastal town in the municipality of la Oliva, located in the northern part of the island of Fuerteventura in the Province of Las Palmas, Canary Islands, Spain. It has a population of 1.680 residents (2022).

== History ==
The history of el Cotillo dates back to the 17th century, when it was known as a fishing settlement based in the disembarkation area called “Puerto del Roque”. The Island Council of Fuerteventura established in that same area the so-called “Casa del Puerto del Tostón”, which became one of the ports of arrival of the trade route between Madeira and Fuerteventura. It wasn't until mid-20th century before it was generally known as “el Cotillo”. The village's port lost its commercial importance over time, and the sparsely populated town relied completely on fishery for their primary income. During the eighties, tourism became an economic alternative to fishery, and the population grew considerably.

== Places of interest ==
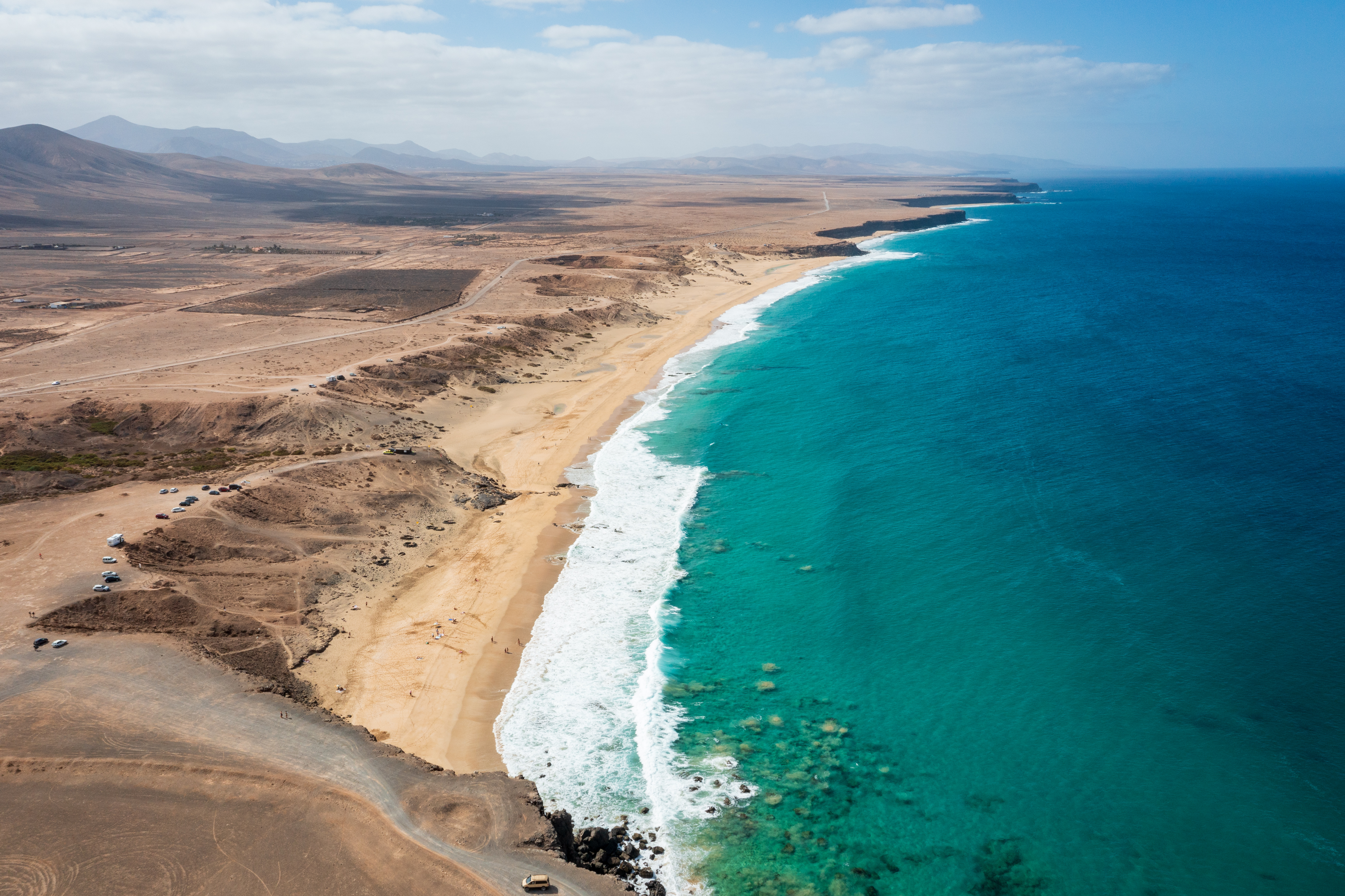
El Cotillo beach

El Cotillo is surrounded by some of Europe's best beaches, including a range of bays with crystal clear waters and fine sand beaches, known as “la Concha” and “los Lagos”. In 2016, local newspaper La Provincia - Diario de Las Palmas reported that el Cotillo's beaches ranked among the ten best ones in Europe, as voted for by users of the online travel site TripAdvisor.

Torre del Tostón is the village's most prominent monument. It was built in 1700 to defend the coast against pirates who operated from France, England and North Africa (Barbary pirates). Torre del Tostón was recognized as “Bien de Interés Cultural” in 1949.
