= Miguel Alfonso =

Spanish footballer (born 1976)

Personal information
- Full name: Miguel Antonio Alfonso Lóbez
- Date of birth: August 9, 1976 (age 50)
- Place of birth: Zaragoza, Spain
- Position: Defender

Senior career*
Years	Team	Apps	(Gls)
1994–1995	Huesca	23	(0)
1995–2000	Deportivo Aragón	136	(4)
2000–2001	Airdrieonians	12	(0)
2001	Raith Rovers	5	(0)
2001–2003	Badajoz	28	(0)
2002	→ Huesca (loan)	10	(1)
2003–2005	Cultural Leonesa	62	(1)
2005–2007	Leganés	45	(0)
2007–2008	Fuerteventura	23	(1)
Total		344	(7)
- * Club domestic league appearances and goals

Miguel Antonio Alfonso Lóbez (born 9 August 1976) is a Spanish retired footballer who now works at Bemiser in his home country.

== Career ==
Alfonso started his senior career with SD Huesca and Deportivo Aragón. In 2000, he signed for Airdrieonians in the Scottish First Division, where he made eighteen appearances and scored one goal.

After that, he played for Scottish club Raith Rovers and Spanish clubs CD Badajoz (with a loan to Huesca), Cultural y Deportiva Leonesa, CD Leganés, and UD Fuerteventura before retiring in 2008.
