= Castillo de San Buenaventura =

Defense tower in the Canary Islands, Spain

Coordinates: 28°23′36.55″N 13°51′18.98″W

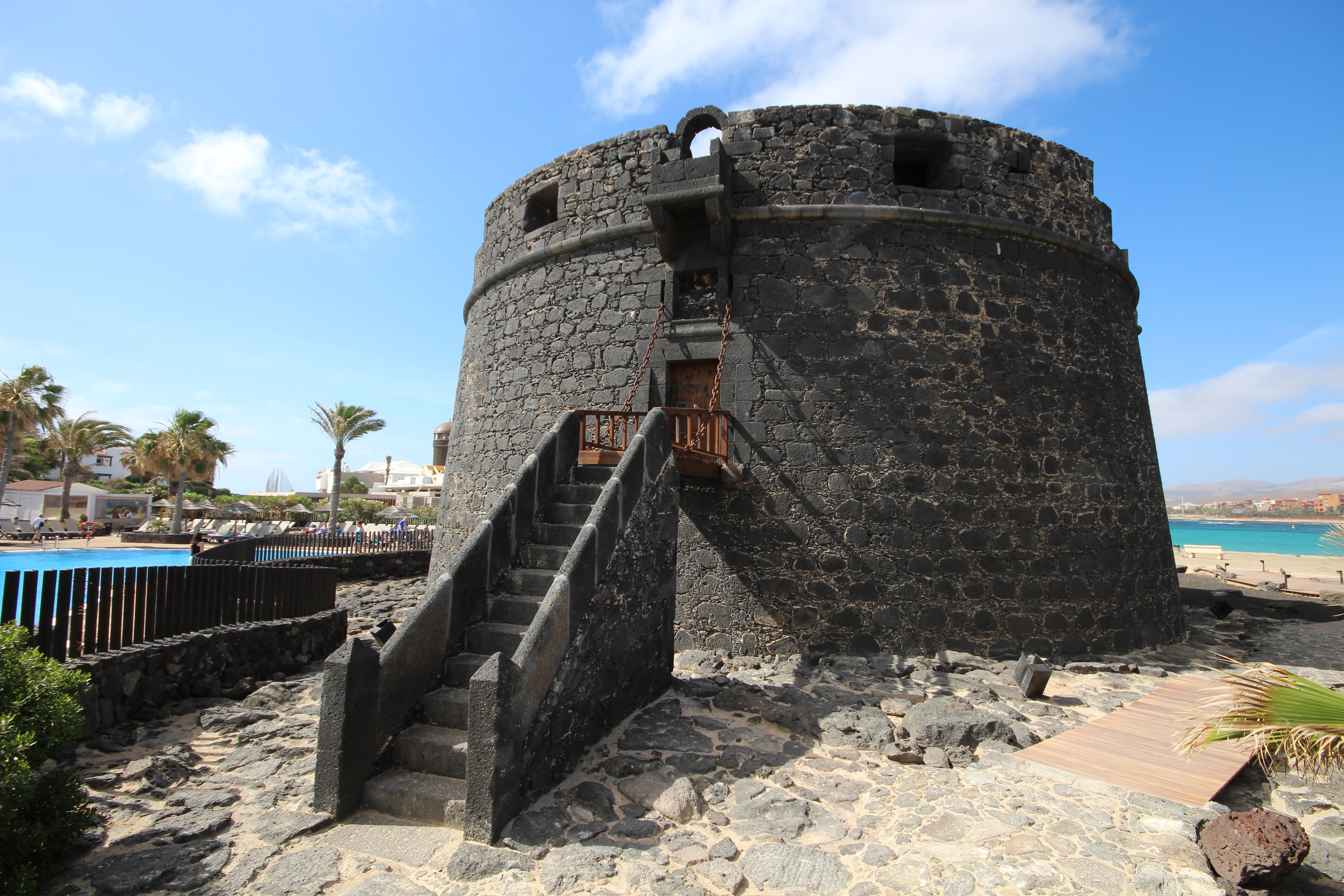
Castillo de San Buenaventura

Castillo de San Buenaventura is a defense tower located in Caleta de Fuste, a small town on the island of Fuerteventura, Canary Islands, Spain. It is also known as "Castillo de Caleta de Fuste", and the tower was recognized as historic-artistic monument in 1949.

== History ==
In the 18th century, the archipelago's commanding general at the time, Andrés Bonito y Pignatelli, ordered military engineer Claudio de L'Isle to build a tower to defend the area against pirates who operated from France, England and North Africa (Barbary pirates). Bonito y Pignatelli, who also built Torre de Tostón in the coastal town of El Cotillo, died in 1743.

== Features ==
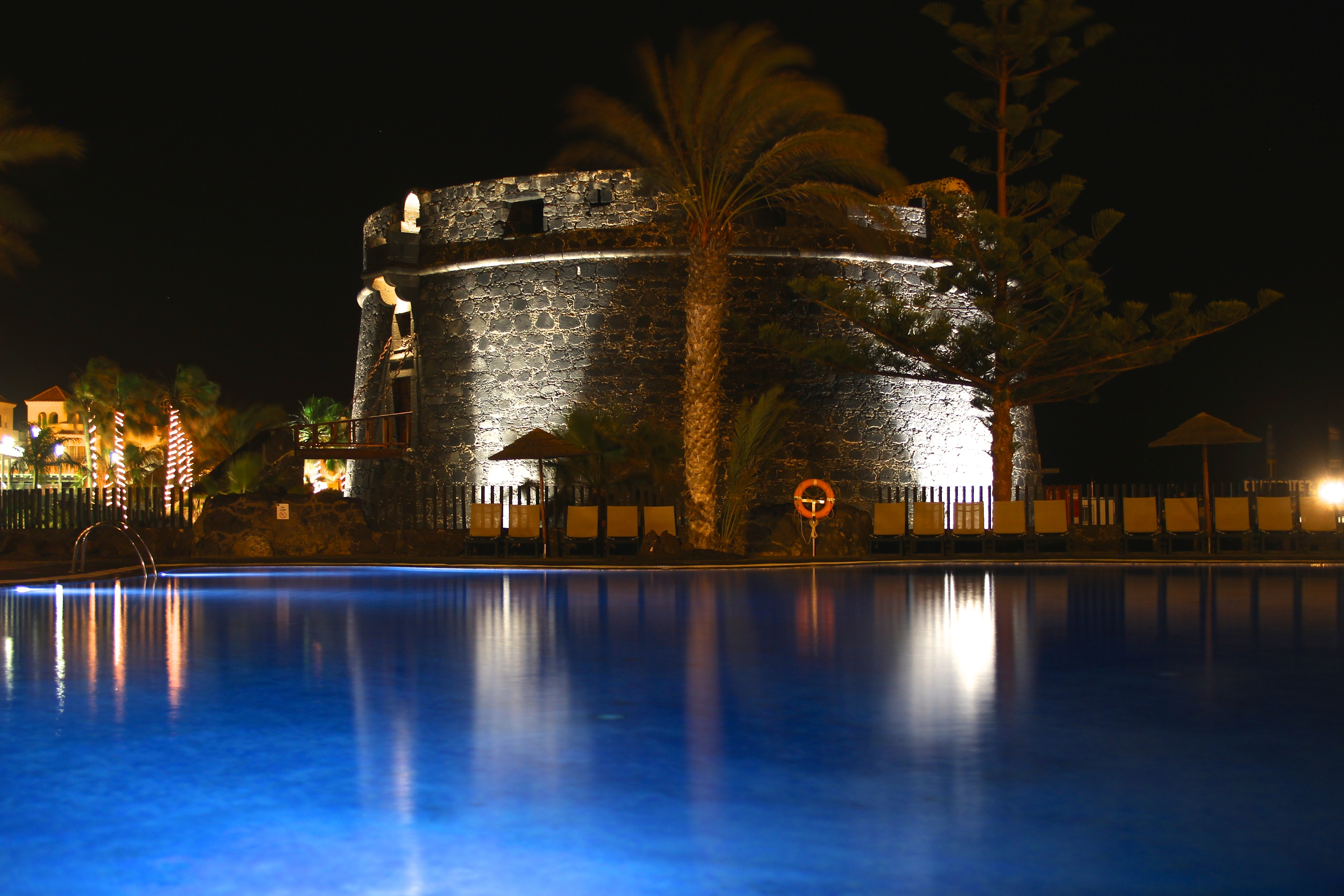
Castillo de San Buenaventura

Castillo de San Buenaventura included two iron cannons, a vault supported by a solid pillar in the center, as well as men employed as watchmen. The castle's rooftop included a bartizan, and a cistern to store water. Located near Caleta de Fuste's marina, visitors can access the tower via a stone staircase, which features a drawbridge with iron chains. Castillo de San Buenaventura is one of the town's prominent monuments.

== Sources ==
- Guía de Fuerteventura
- Government of the Canary Islands
- ViajeJet travel blog
- Fuerteventura travel guide
