= Tefía Agricultural Penitentiary Colony =

- Colonia Agrícola Penitenciaria de Tefia
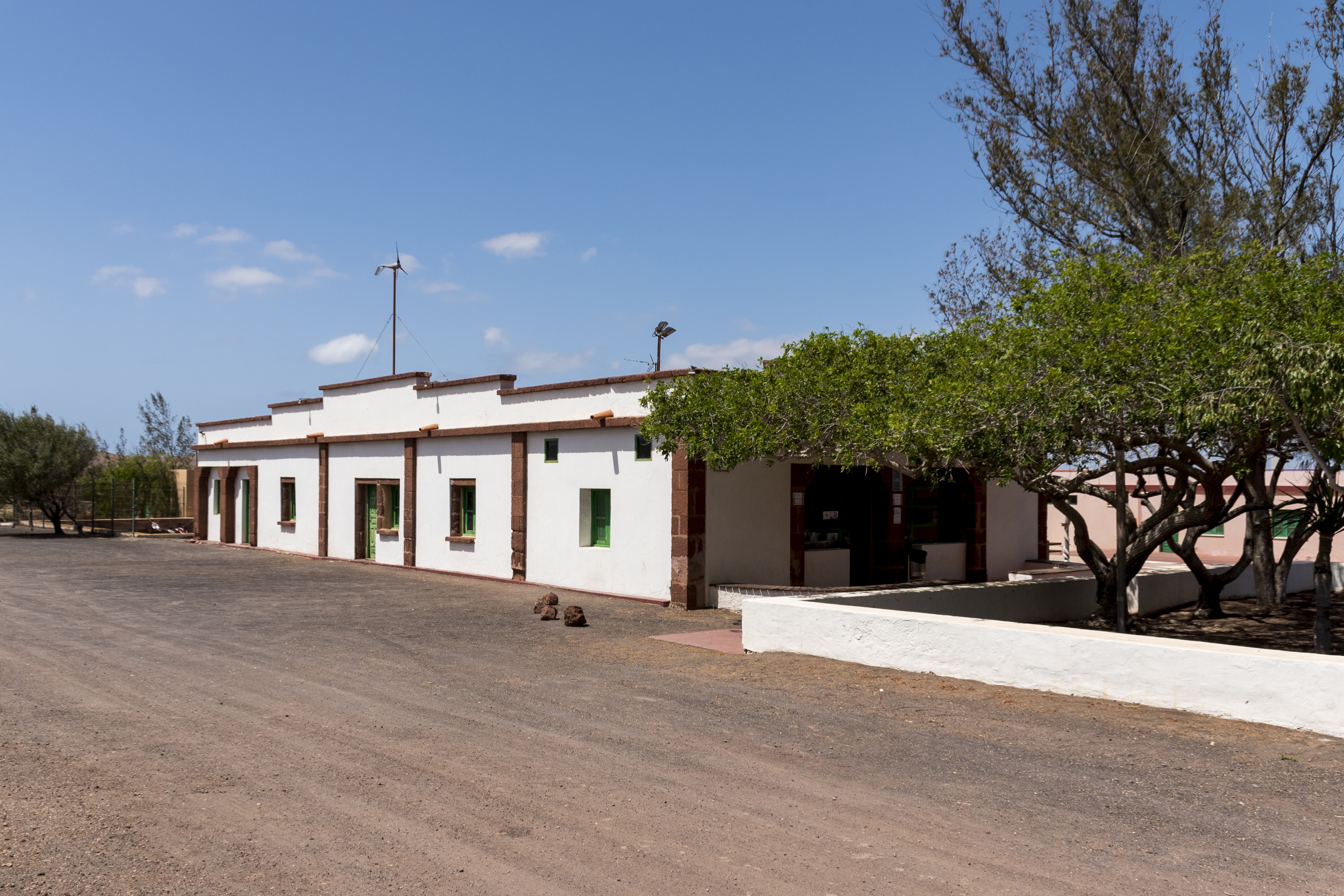

General information
- Type: Concentration camp
- Location: Puerto del Rosario, Spain
- Coordinates: 28°31′36″N 14°00′19″W
- Opened: 11 February 1954
- Closed: 21 July 1966

The Tefía Agricultural Penitentiary Colony (Spanish: Colonia Agrícola Penitenciaria de Tefia), was a concentration camp located in the village of Tefia, in the municipality of Puerto del Rosario on the Fuerteventura Island. It was established in 1954 during the Francoist regime and served till 1966 as a detention center for prisoners, and for the re-education of male homosexuals.

== Background ==
During the regime of Francisco Franco, who served as the dictator of Spain from 1939 to 1975, homosexuality was repressed and considered undesirable. In 1954, an amendment was made to the law of Vagos y maleantes (es), which allowed people to be persecuted for their sexual orientation. It allowed an imprisonment of one to three years for homosexuals, who were considered a danger to the society. As per the amended law, homosexual and transsexual people were confined to "labor centers" and "penitentiary agricultural colonies", which were forced labor concentration camps. They were often subjected to inhumane conditions at these camps, starved, beaten, and made to work until exhaustion.

== History ==
The Tefia Agricultural Penitentiary Colony was established by governmental order passed on 15 January 1954, at the location of a former military barracks and airfield. The facility was opened on 11 February 1954. While it housed between 80 and 100 homosexuals, it was also used to house common and political prisoners.

The colony was located on a barren site. The inmates were subjected to hard labor ranging including agricultural and other work. They were commanded by the military, and were subjected to torture, hunger and sexual repression. They were made to work until exhaustion and subjected to habitual mistreatment by the officials.

On 21 July 1966, the colony was closed by an executive order of the Ministry of Justice, as the population of the inmates was deemed as low. The remaining inmates were transferred to the Barranco Seco prison in Las Palmas in Gran Canaria.

== Aftermath and legacy ==
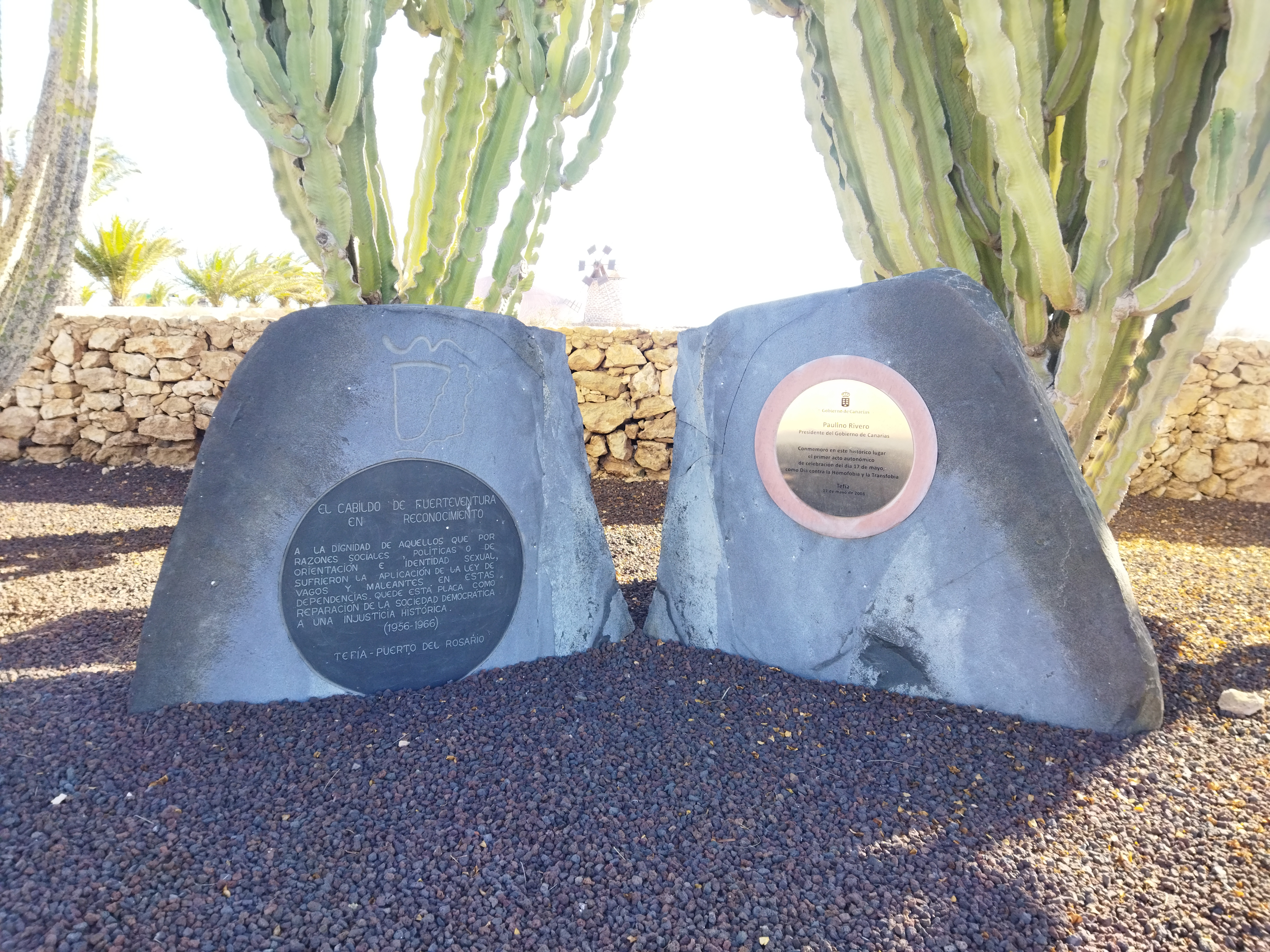
Commemorative milestones installed at the location

After the closure of the camp, it was converted to a youth hostel.

In 2004, the Government of Canary Islands installed a plaque in memory of those who were held in Tefia to commemorate fifty years of its opening. On 17 May 2008, on the International Day against Homophobia, the government established another commemorative milestone at the location.

In 2006, the novel Viaje al centro de la infamia, written by historian Miguel Ángel Sosa Machín, was released. It is set in the mid-1950s and incorporates elements of the colony in Tefia.

In 2018, director Ferran Navarro-Beltrán announced a film based on the history of the colony at Tefia.

In 2019, Juan Sepulveda, Antonio Santos and Marina Cochet published the graphic novel, El Violeta, the plot of which is inspired by the testimonies of Octavio García, one of the survivors of the Tefia concentration camp.

In 2020, Ismael Lozano Latorre published the novel, Vagos y Maleantes, in which one of its protagonists, an old man with Alzheimer's disease, recounts his youth at the Tefia concentration camp.

In April 2023, Nando López published the novel, Los chosen, in which the Tefia concentration camp is one of the main themes in the plot set in the 1950s.

In June 2023, The Nights of Tefia, a television drama based on the Tefia concentration camp, was released.
