= Estadio Municipal de Los Pozos =

Coordinates: 28.49152°N 13.86730°W

The Estadio Municipal de Los Pozos is the home stadium of both CD Unión Puerto and CD Herbania. It is situated in the Fuerteventura capital Puerto del Rosario. The ground seats 2,000 spectators.
