= La Oliva =

- Municipality
- Flag Coat of arms

- Municipal location in Fuerteventura

- Location in the province of Las Palmas La Oliva (Canary Islands) La Oliva (Spain, Canary Islands)
- Coordinates: 28°36′40″N 13°55′40″W
- Country: Spain
- Autonomous Community: Canary Islands
- Province: Las Palmas
- Island: Fuerteventura

Area
  - Total: 356.13 km^{2} (137.50 sq mi)

Population (2025-01-01)
  - Total: 30,022
  - Density: 84.301/km^{2} (218.34/sq mi)

La Oliva (pronounced [la oˈliβa]) is a town and a municipality in the northern part of the island of Fuerteventura in the Province of Las Palmas, Canary Islands, Spain. The population is 29,174 (2023), and the area is 356.13 km^{2}. The municipality includes the Lobos Island to the northeast, just off Corralejo.

== History ==
An anonymous manuscript relates that the town of La Oliva was founded in 1500 by individuals known to the Hernández brothers, residents of Betancuria. La Oliva is also the historic seat of the island's Colonels, who resided in the stately Casa de los Coroneles. Because of this, it succeeded the Villa de Betancuria as the capital of Fuerteventura from 1834 until 1860, when Puerto de Cabras became the new capital.

The largest town of the municipality, Corralejo (14,318 inhabitants in 2023, including Playa de Corralejo), is a port town and major beach resort at the northernmost point of the island. Other major settlements and their 2023 population are Geafond (3,985), Villaverde (2,118), Lajares (2,012), and El Cotillo (1,474); the town of La Oliva had 1,720.

La Oliva permitted a RIU hotel to be built on the Corralejo Dunes in the 1970s. The dunes were later declared a national park in 1982. In 2003, the Spanish government granted a 30-year concession to allow the hotel to remain during that time. In 2024, the Spanish government declared that the Riu La Oliva hotel had breached planning regulations by expanding without consent and declared the concession expired. The Ministry of Ecological Transition ordered the hotel and apartments be demolished. The government of the Canary Islands appealed this, claiming it was a regional government responsibility, but the Spanish Constitutional Court ruled that the national government had authority and ordered the hotel be demolished.

== Gallery ==
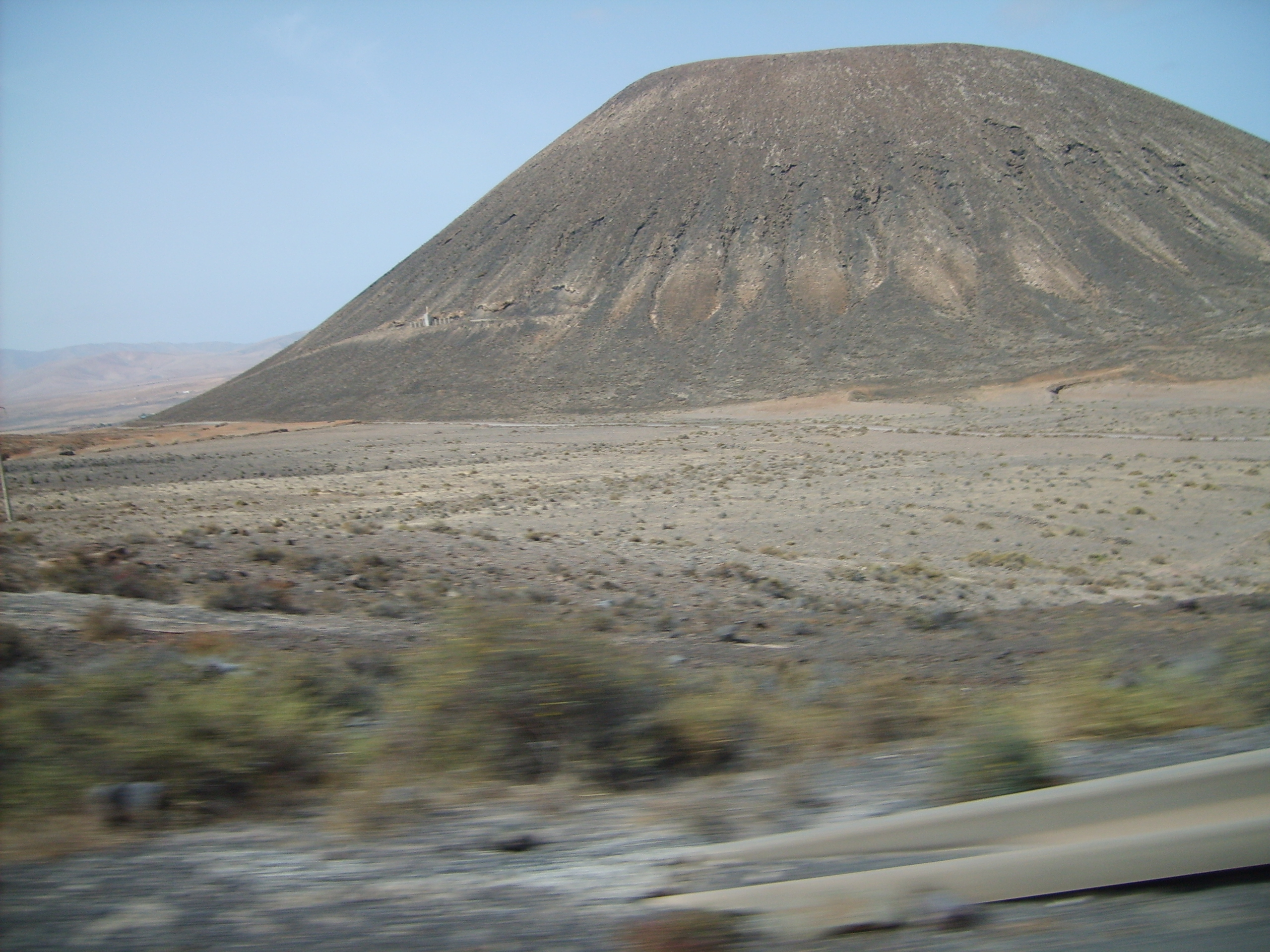
"Montaña Quemada" Canyon

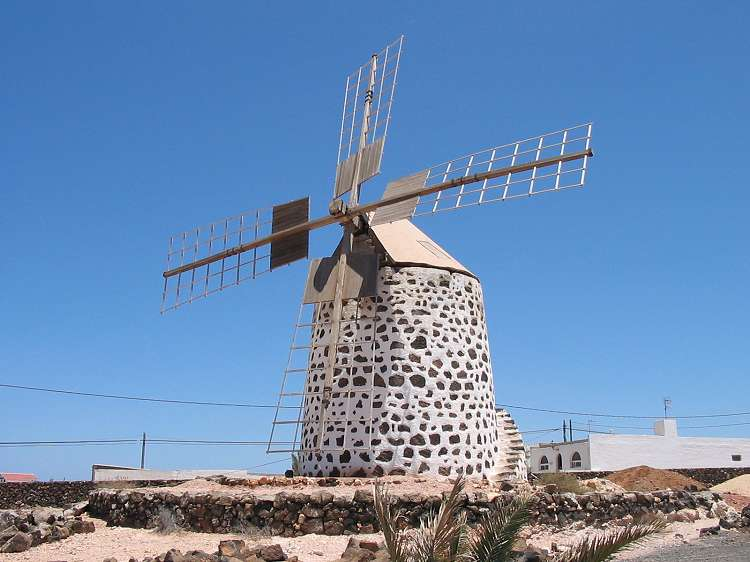
A stone-built windmill near the beach of La Oliva

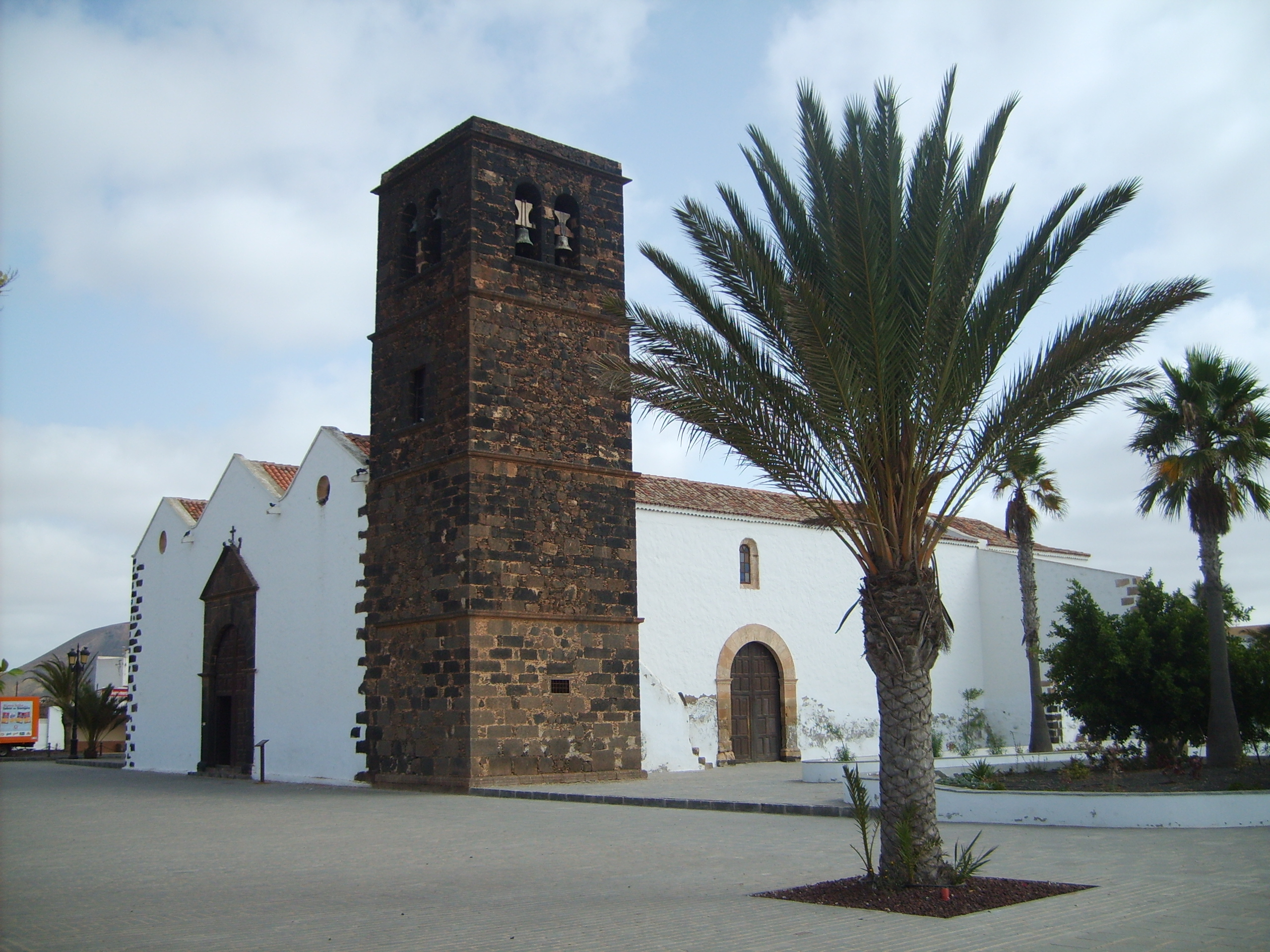
Church of Our Lady of La Candelaria

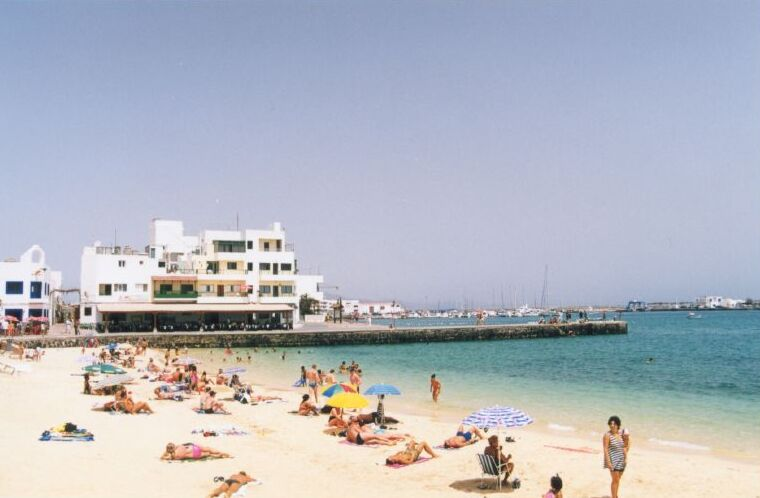
Corralejo beach

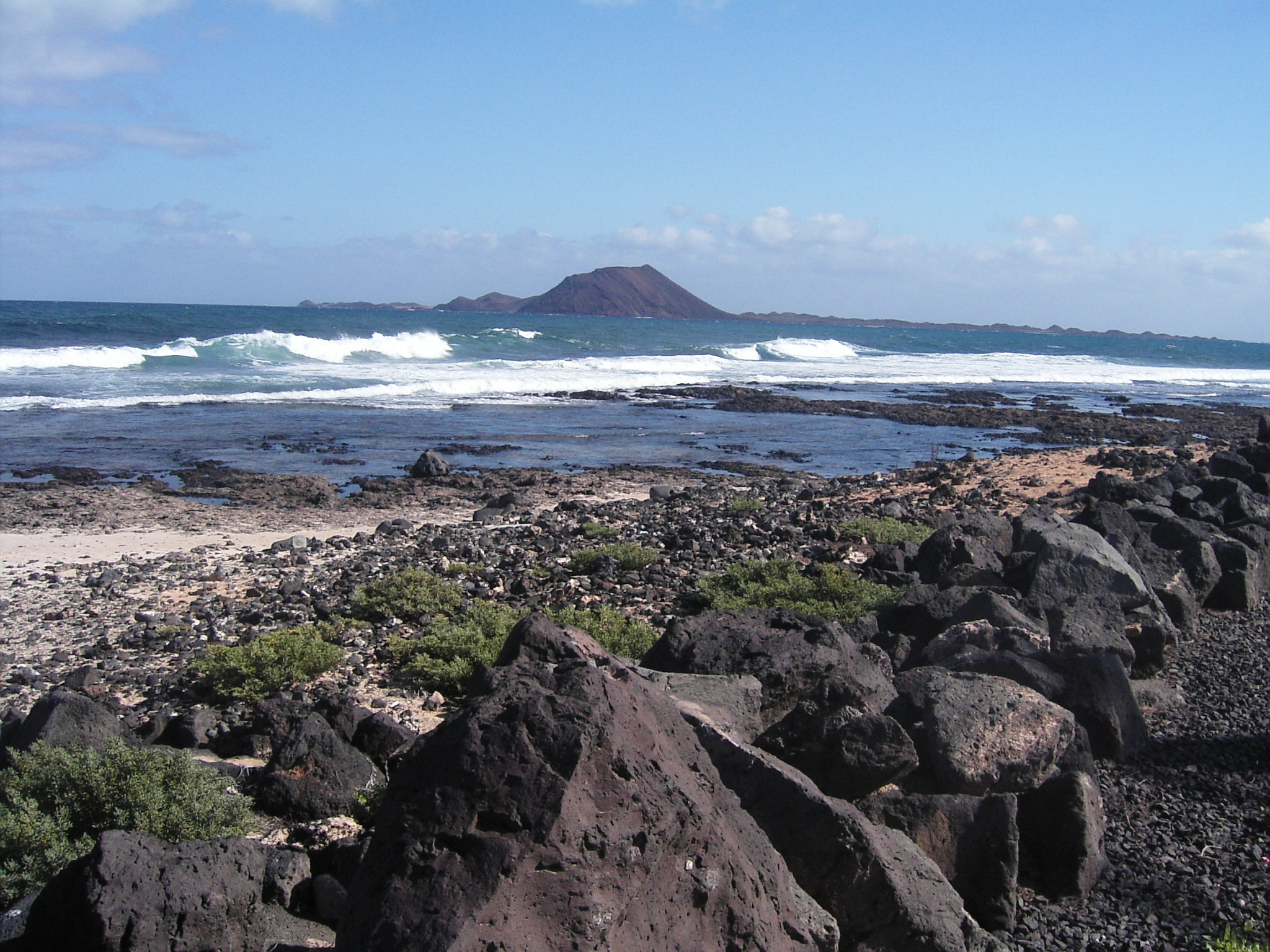
Los Lobos Island

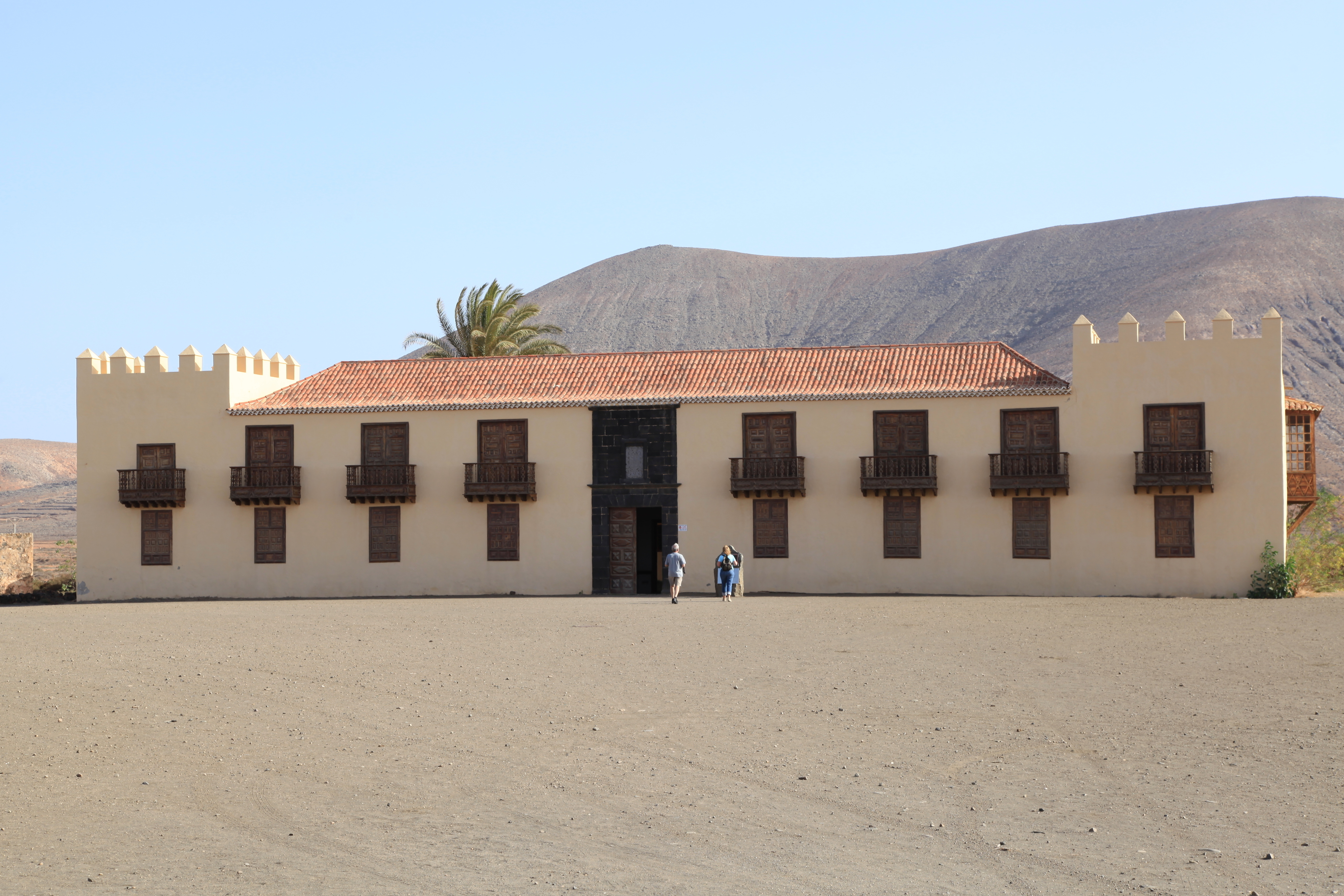
Casa de los Coroneles, La Oliva

== See also ==
- List of municipalities in Las Palmas
