= Caleta de Fuste =

Community in Antigua, Las Palmas, Spain

Coordinates: 28°23′03.40″N 13°52′11.12″W

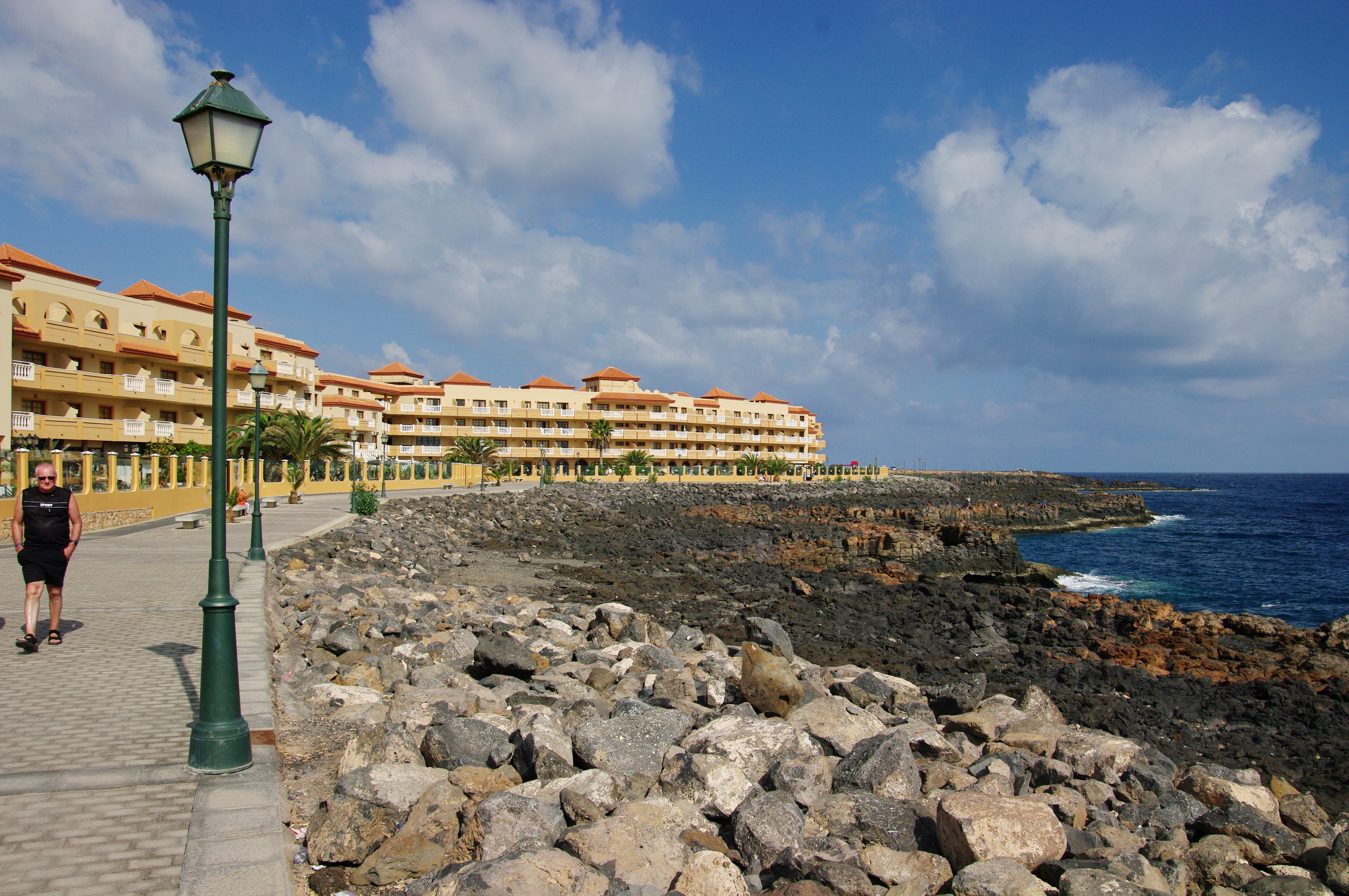
Caleta de Fuste seafront

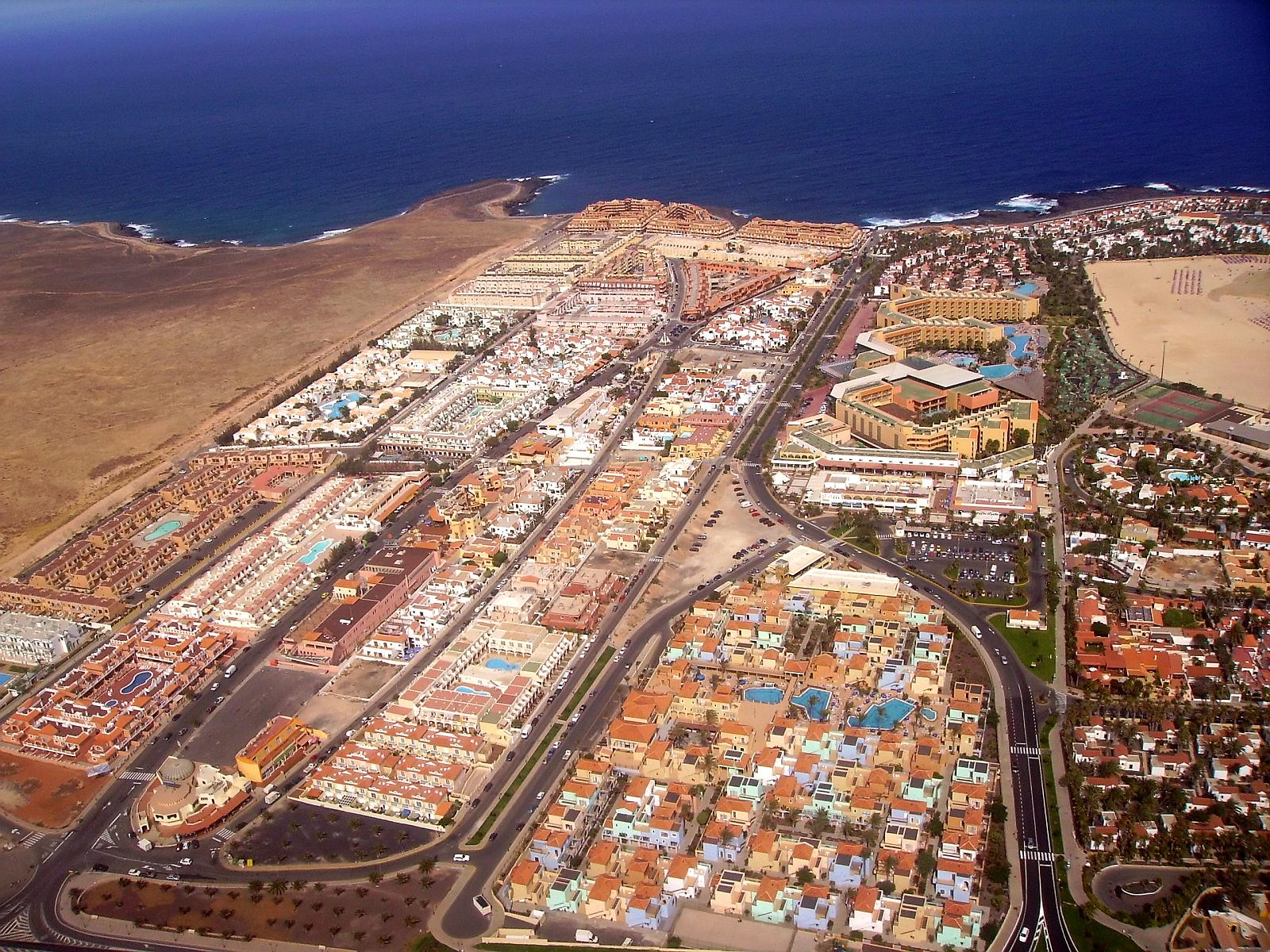
Caleta de Fuste / Costa Caleta, Fuerteventura

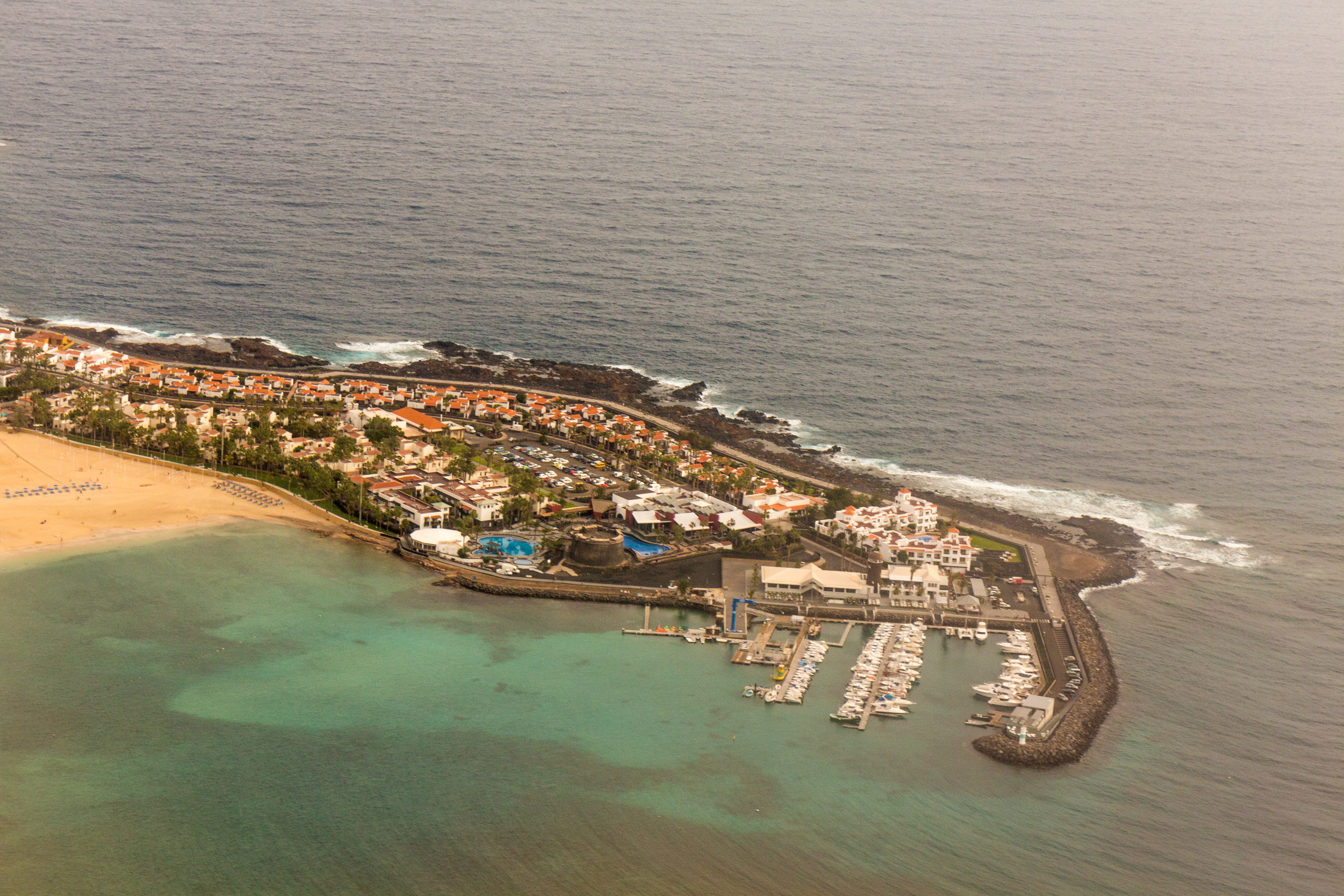
Caleta de Fuste - Marina - Air Photo (2014)

Caleta de Fuste (also known as El Castillo and Costa Caleta) is the largest community in the municipality of Antigua, Las Palmas, Spain, on the island of Fuerteventura in the Canary Islands.

The area is frequented by a variety of tourists and has numerous hotels, shops, boutiques, bars, cafes and restaurants on or near the beaches. In the main harbour is a castle built as a martello tower by the military engineer Claudio de Lisne in 1743.

In addition to beach activities, local recreation includes sailing, diving, windsurfing and scuba exploration. The ocean waters in the area are known for their dolphin and turtle populations. The championship golf course, one of two at Fuerteventura, is close by and hosted the 2004 Spanish Open. The second golf course, which was completed in 2007, is located adjacent to the first.
