= Puerto del Rosario =

- Municipality
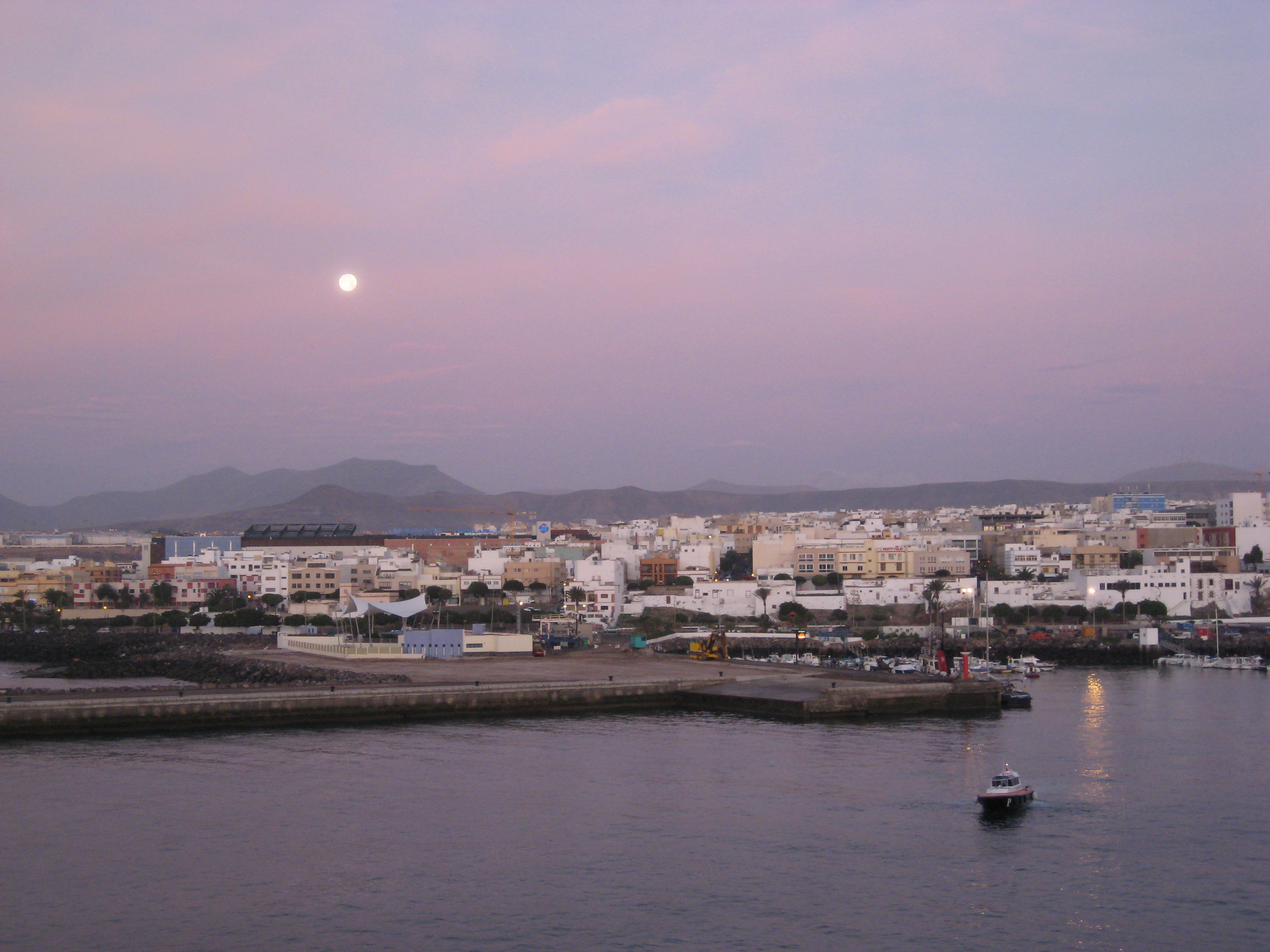
- The town at morning light

- Flag Coat of arms
- Location of Puerto del Rosario
- Location within Fuerteventura Location within Canary Islands Location within Spain, Canary Islands
- Coordinates: 28°30′N 13°52′W
- Country: Spain
- Autonomous Community: Canary Islands
- Province: Las Palmas
- Island: Fuerteventura

Government
  - Mayor: David de Vera (CC)

Area
  - Total: 289.95 km^{2} (111.95 sq mi)
- Elevation (AMSL): 16 m (52 ft)

Population (start of 2023)Instituto Nacional de Estadistica, Madrid, 2023
  - Total: 43,493
  - Density: 150.00/km^{2} (388.50/sq mi)
- Time zone: UTC+0 (CET)
  - Summer (DST): UTC+1 (CEST (GMT +1))
- Postal code: 35600
- Area code: +34 (Spain) + 928 (Las Palmas)
- Website: www.puertodelrosario.org/35017/paginas/asp/inicio.asp

Puerto del Rosario (Spanish pronunciation: [ˈpweɾto ðel roˈsaɾjo]) is a town and a municipality in the eastern part of the island of Fuerteventura in the Las Palmas province in the Canary Islands. It has been the capital of Fuerteventura since 1860. The town's population is 29,160 (2013), the administrative district's (municipio de Puerto del Rosario) population is 36,744 and its area is 289.95 km².

== History ==
Originally known as Puerto de Cabras (Port of the Goats), Puerto del Rosario was initially of little political importance on the island, living in the shadow of the ancient capital Betancuria. It had long been a fishing settlement and benefited from a sheltered natural harbour. The "Atlantic Navigator", written in 1854, describes the town then known as "Cabras" as "the main port", but goes on to describe it as an "insignificant place". The "Atlantic Navigator" describes the makeshift landing area for shipping as "indifferent", while calling the "beach of shingles" where ships anchor as "even worse".

It was this status as the "central port" of the island that saw it become the capital of the island in 1860, taking that honour from Antigua. The port was popular for shipping goats and this is where its original name came from. However, in 1957, it was decided that the name "Cabras" was not suitable. A more attractive name was selected and Puerto de Cabras was renamed Puerto del Rosario ("rosary port").

The Tefía Agricultural Penitentiary Colony (Colonia Agrícola Penitenciaria de Tefia) was a concentration camp located in the village of Tefia in Puerto del Rosario from 1954 to 1966 and served as a detention center for prisoners, and for the re-education of male homosexuals.

During the 1960s there was rural and urban migration from the smaller villages and farm areas of the island into Puerto del Rosario. The population grew in these years. Further population growth occurred in 1976 when, due to the decolonisation of the North African territories like the Spanish Sahara, the Spanish Foreign Legion made Puerto del Rosario their base.

== Climate ==
Under the Köppen climate classification, Puerto del Rosario has a hot desert climate (BWh).

Climate data for Fuerteventura Airport 25m (1991-2020), extremes (1967-present)
Month	Jan	Feb	Mar	Apr	May	Jun	Jul	Aug	Sep	Oct	Nov	Dec	Year
Record high °C (°F)	29.9 (85.8)	30.8 (87.4)	34.0 (93.2)	38.0 (100.4)	36.8 (98.2)	41.6 (106.9)	43.0 (109.4)	41.0 (105.8)	37.9 (100.2)	38.7 (101.7)	34.8 (94.6)	29.5 (85.1)	43.0 (109.4)
Mean daily maximum °C (°F)	20.8 (69.4)	21.1 (70.0)	22.3 (72.1)	23.2 (73.8)	24.7 (76.5)	26.3 (79.3)	27.5 (81.5)	27.9 (82.2)	27.5 (81.5)	26.4 (79.5)	24.2 (75.6)	22.1 (71.8)	24.5 (76.1)
Daily mean °C (°F)	17.8 (64.0)	18.0 (64.4)	18.9 (66.0)	19.8 (67.6)	21.2 (70.2)	22.9 (73.2)	24.3 (75.7)	24.9 (76.8)	24.5 (76.1)	23.3 (73.9)	21.1 (70.0)	19.1 (66.4)	21.3 (70.4)
Mean daily minimum °C (°F)	14.9 (58.8)	14.9 (58.8)	15.5 (59.9)	16.4 (61.5)	17.7 (63.9)	19.5 (67.1)	21.1 (70.0)	21.9 (71.4)	21.5 (70.7)	20.2 (68.4)	18.0 (64.4)	16.1 (61.0)	18.1 (64.7)
Record low °C (°F)	8.0 (46.4)	8.0 (46.4)	8.0 (46.4)	9.5 (49.1)	11.6 (52.9)	13.0 (55.4)	14.0 (57.2)	15.0 (59.0)	15.0 (59.0)	12.0 (53.6)	10.5 (50.9)	9.0 (48.2)	8.0 (46.4)
Average precipitation mm (inches)	12.6 (0.50)	10.0 (0.39)	9.7 (0.38)	4.6 (0.18)	0.8 (0.03)	0.1 (0.00)	0.0 (0.0)	0.3 (0.01)	2.0 (0.08)	11.4 (0.45)	13.3 (0.52)	21.2 (0.83)	86 (3.37)
Average precipitation days (≥ 1 mm)	2.3	1.9	1.8	0.8	0.2	0.0	0.0	0.1	0.5	1.8	2.1	2.6	14.1
Average relative humidity (%)	67	68	67	66	64	66	68	70	72	71	69	70	68
Mean monthly sunshine hours	195.3	192.1	238.7	249.0	285.2	285.0	303.8	291.4	261.0	226.3	195.0	192.2	2,915
Percentage possible sunshine	59	61	64	64	68	69	71	71	70	64	60	60	65
Source: Agencia Estatal de Meteorología

== Transport ==
There are regular ferry services to Las Palmas and Santa Cruz de Tenerife with Naviera Armas. Fuerteventura Airport is situated near El Matorral, 6 km south of Puerto del Rosario.

== Gallery ==
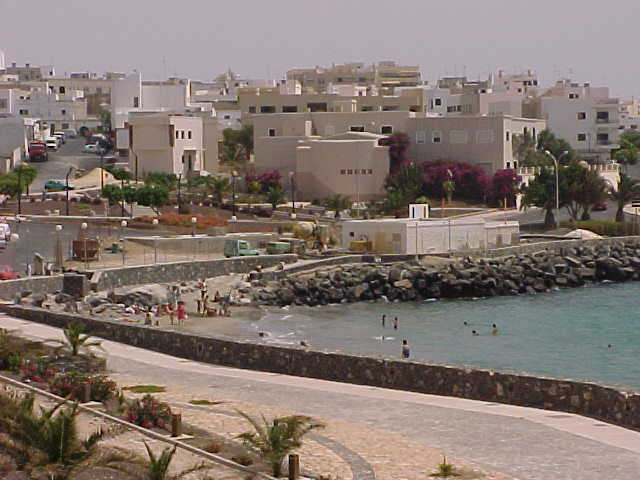
Popular University. Puerto del Rosario (Fuerteventura)

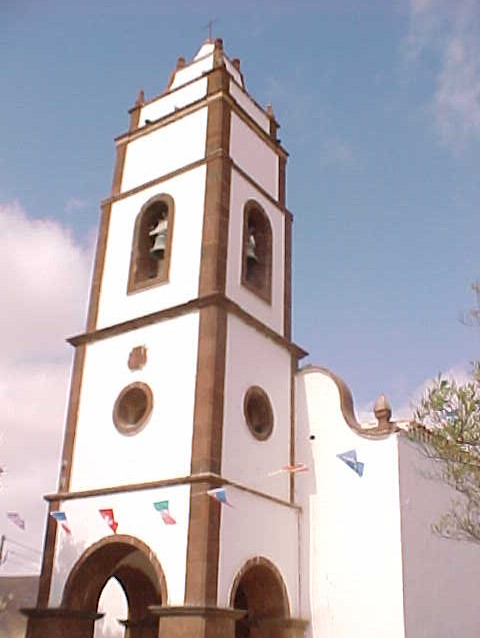
Bell tower of Santo Domingo de Guzmán church

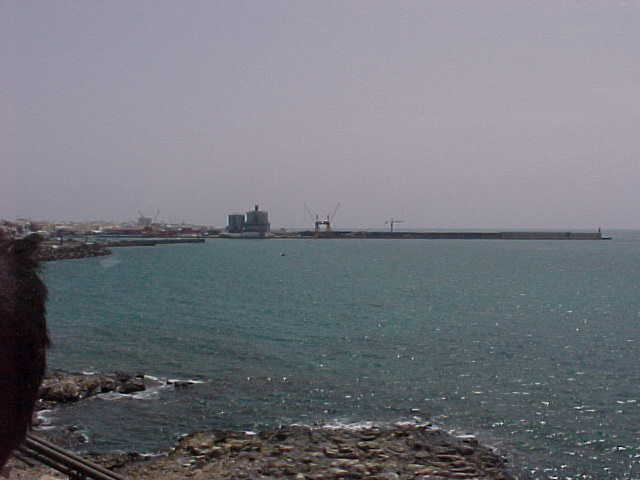
Puerto del Rosario grew around its harbour and it still plays a crucial role in the town today for transport and trade

== See also ==
- List of municipalities in Las Palmas
