= Peraza =

Peraza is a surname. Notable people with the surname include:

- Armando Peraza (1924–2014), Latin jazz percussionist
- Carlos Castillo Peraza (1947–2000), intellectual, journalist and Mexican politician, Member of the National Action Party
- Cosme de la Torriente y Peraza, Cuban politician
- Elluz Peraza (born 1958), pageant titleholder, was born in Caracas, Venezuela
- Enrique Caballero Peraza (born 1959), Mexican politician, Medical Doctor and Psychologist
- Guillén Peraza, Castilian Count
- Hernan Peraza the Elder, Castilian conquistador and territorial lord
- Hernan Peraza the Younger, Castilian conquistador and territorial lord
- Inés Peraza, Castilian territorial Lady
- José Peraza, Venezuelan baseball player
- Juanita García Peraza (1897–1970), founder of the only Protestant religion of Puerto Rican origin
- Kevin Peraza, Mexican - American BMX freestyle competitor
- Larrea Peraza, Cuban olympic beach volleyballer at the 2008 Summer Olympics
- Miguel Peraza (born 1959), Mexican self-taught sculptor, born in Mexico City
- Oswald Peraza (born 2000), Venezuelan baseball player
- Oswaldo Peraza (born 1962), former starting pitcher in Major League Baseball
- Sergio Peraza, Mexican sculptor
