= Hernán Peraza the Younger =

Spanish Lord and Conquistador

Hernán Peraza
- Born: Hernán Peraza de Ayala c. 1450; Sevilla
- Died: 1488 (38 years old); San Sebastián de La Gomera
- Other name: Fernán Peraza The Younger (El Joven)/The Groom (El Mozo)
- Occupations: Conquistador, Territorial lord
- Title: Lord of La Gomera and El Hierro
- Predecessor: Inés Peraza de las Casas
- Successor: Beatriz de Bobadilla y Ulloa-Ossorio
- Spouse: Beatriz de Bobadilla y Ulloa-Ossorio
- Children: Guillén Peraza de Ayala and Inés de Herrera y Ayala
- Parent(s): Inés Peraza and Diego García de Herrera
- Family: Peraza family

Hernán Peraza de Ayala (also Fernán Peraza de Ayala; c. 1450 – 1488), also known as Hernán or Fernán Peraza The Younger (“el Joven”) or The Groom (“el Mozo”) to distinguish him from his grandfather, was a nobleman and Castilian conquistador who participated in the European conquest of the Canary Islands in the 15th century.

Peraza was also the territorial lord of the islands of La Gomera and El Hierro.

== Biography ==
Hernán Peraza the Younger was born in the city of Seville in approximately 1450. He was the son of Diego Garcia de Herrera and Inés Peraza de las Casas, lords of the Canary Islands by inheritance of his grandfather, Hernán Peraza the Elder, and therefore part of the influential Peraza family that was significant in the history of the Canary Islands.

In 1477 he began to govern the island of La Gomera on behalf of his parents, settled in Lanzarote, and the island was officially handed over to him the following year. Peraza faced several uprisings of the aborigines in the following years, motivated by his despotic government.

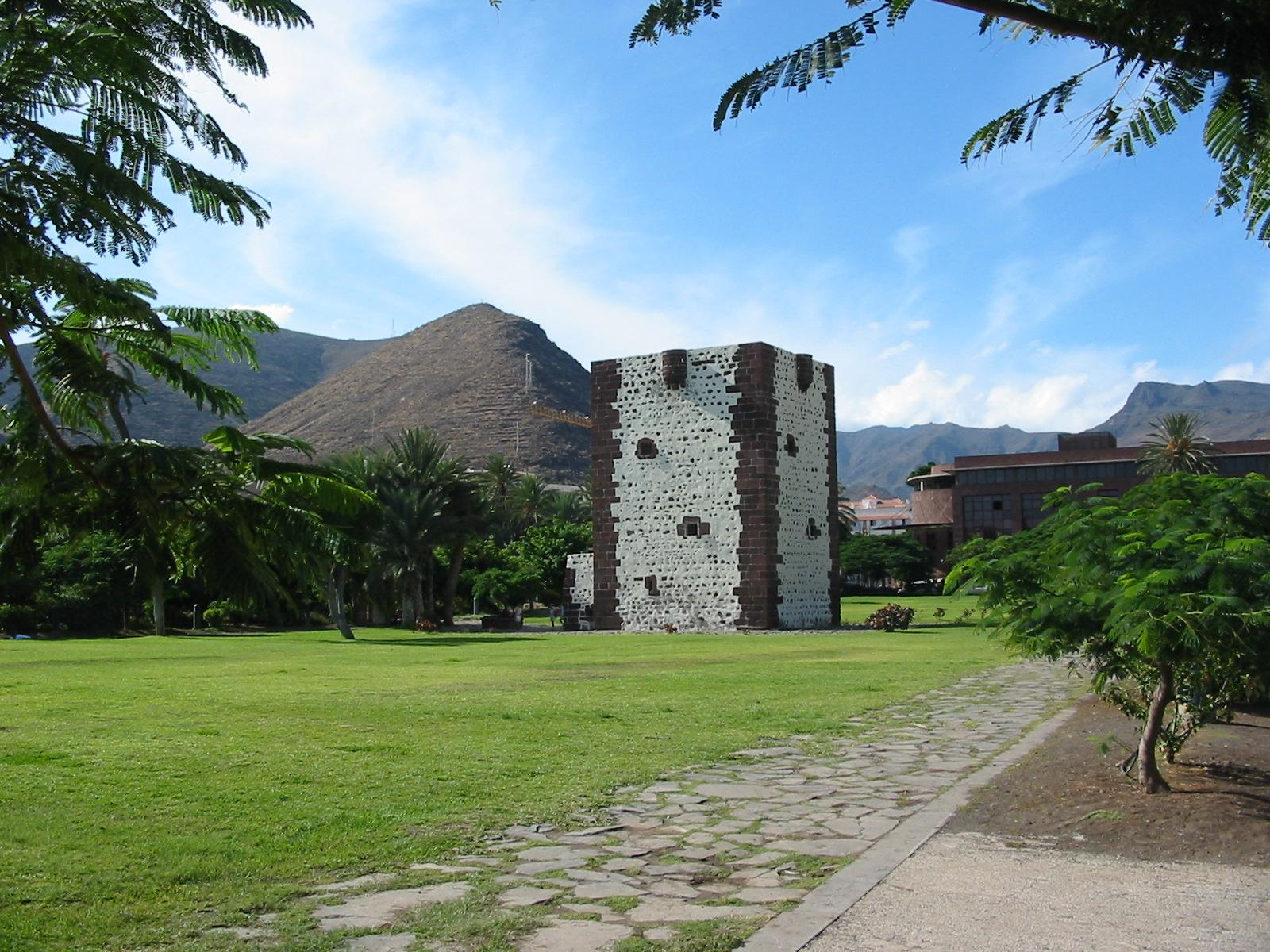
"Torre del Conde" ("Tower of the Count"), the residence tower of Hernán Peraza the Younger, originally constructed by his grandfather Hernán Peraza The Elder in 1450.

In the month of May 1481, Captain Juan Rejón accidentally arrived on the island with his family and few men, being well received by the Gomeran people of Mulagua. Rejón however, had previously been in a confrontation with Peraza's father, Diego de Herrera, in 1479, when Rejón went to the island of Lanzarote to ask for Herrera's help, but he did not accept because he was accompanied by the vassals of the lord that they had provoked with their acts in the well-known "Pesquisa de Cabitos" ("Search/quest for goats") which determined the ownership of the conquered islands. The historian Juan de Abréu Galindo claims that Hernán, by order of his father, did not allow Rejón to disembark in the port of Arrecife. Therefore when Peraza, who had become estranged from his father Diego de Herrera years earlier, learned of Rejón's presence he sent several vassals to arrest him and bring him before Peraza. Rejón refused and each confronted the other with the result that Rejón was speared to death.

Elvira de Sotomayor, Rejón's widow, and other relatives filed complaints in court against Peraza for the murder of the captain, being called to the presence of the Catholic Monarchs. As conditions for royal forgiveness, achieved through the intercession of Peraza's high-level friends and relatives in court, he was forced to marry Beatriz de Bobadilla y Ulloa-Ossorio, and also made to collaborate in the conquest of Gran Canaria that was taking place at that time. Thus, in 1482 Peraza marched to Agaete with about eighty of his Gomeran vassals, the translator Juan Mayor, and about 70–80 men left by his father from Lanzarote and Fuerteventura, and collaborated with Alonso Fernández de Lugo. Together they managed to capture the king (or guanarteme) of Gáldar, Tenesor Semidán, who after being baptized collaborated with the conquerors attracting many of his former vassals, leading to the consummation of the conquest soon after.

After the conquest of Gran Canaria in 1483, Peraza returned to La Gomera. At this time, he made an alliance pact – "Guahedun pact" – with the Gomeran cantons that did not recognize him as lord. This agreement, which Peraza and the Castilians understood as an act of submission, consisted of a symbolic twinning between Peraza and the gomeros when drinking milk from the same vessel.

In 1486 Peraza received the island of El Hierro from his mother, Inés Peraza, and in 1488 the mayorazgo of the Canary Islands. That same year Peraza was besieged in the tower of San Sebastián by the rebellious Gomeras, requesting through his mother the help of the Governor of Gran Canaria, Pedro de Vera. Aborigines were defeated, retaliated against, and sold as slaves.

Peraza's brutal treatment of the aboriginals, as well as the exposure of his scandalous affair with Yballa, an aboriginal on the side of Ipalan – and his "sister" under the Guahedun pact – led to his being tried and executed by the Gomeran warrior and leader Hautacuperche, a cousin of Yballa who then led the Gomeran rebellion of 1488. Peraza's death and the subsequent lawsuits between his widow and his mother, caused the latter to revoke the mayorazgo in 1503, just before her death early that year.

== Personal life ==
Hernán Peraza the Younger was a member of the Peraza family that was an influential force in Seville and the Canary Islands. In an arranged marriage, Peraza wed the Lady of the Court Beatriz de Bobadilla by order of Queen Isabella I of Castile in 1482. Beatriz was of the powerful and wealthy Bobadilla family yet had earned the notorious nickname “The Huntress” for her rumored high-profile affairs with Isabella’s husband King Ferdinand II of Aragon and, later on, Christopher Columbus. This marriage was one of the conditions for Peraza to obtain royal forgiveness for his participation in the murder of Captain Juan Rejón.

The couple had a son, Guillén Peraza de Ayala, who was later made the first Count of La Gomera, as well as a daughter, Inés de Herrera y Ayala, who married Pedro Fernández de Lugo, second Adelantado de Canarias and mother of Alonso Luis de Lugo, third Adelantado de Canarias.

Peraza was killed by the warrior Hautacuperche on November 20, 1488 during the aforementioned Gomeran rebellion.

== See also ==
- Peraza family
- Conquest of the Canary Islands
- History of the Canary Islands
