= Peraza family =

The Peraza family was a Castilian noble family of conquistadors, territorial lords, counts, and governors that were a significant force in the history and conquest of the Canary Islands during the Age of Discovery in the fifteenth and sixteenth centuries.

The Canary Islands were first politically unified into a single governance under their rule, though their holdings would fragment and influence would wane over time. Due to their role in the Islands' political history, they are among the oldest recorded family lineages on the Canaries.

== Overview ==
=== Background ===
The Peraza family had previously been based in Seville. The family was initially of minor prominence there with their common ancestor, Bartolomé Ruiz Peraza (ca. 1335-1390), became the city's senior collector (“recaudador mayor de Sevilla”) in 1370, like his father before him, and was later elevated to a knight.

Their status rose further as his daughter, born as Leonor Ruiz de Peraza, married Gonzalo Pérez Martel y Mathe de Luna, the VI Lord of neighboring Almonaster la Real, and born to the powerful Martel and Mathe de Luna families. He was a descendant of a French knight migrated from France to Aragon and then to Seville during the Reconquista. Gonzalo Martel also owned rights and interests in the Canary Islands, thanks to a royal grant by King Enrique III of Castile to him in 1390 allowing him to conquer them. Martel would lead a successful expedition in 1393 which returned to the court of Castile with many riches and slaves, laying the foundation for further involvement in the islands by his descendants.

=== Establishment in the Canary Islands ===
The couple's second son, Hernán/Fernán Peraza Martel (better known as "Hernán Peraza the Elder") became the patriarch of the family lineage in the Canaries. It was he that was responsible for forging the direction and execution the strategy to conquer the entirety of the Canary Islands and lay long-term family roots there. This effort took years of maneuvering, from high-level trades to outright forceful conquest.

Hernán Peraza the Elder was Lord of Valdeflores, warden of the Castle of Matrera in 1420, as well as Faithful Executor and a Knight veintiquatro of Seville. By 1424 Peraza was married to Inés de las Casas, daughter of Juan de las Casas, a member of the local nobility.

During this period Peraza began to become actively involved in the Canary Islands, first by inheriting from his father Gonzalo Martel the royal right to conquest in them. Additionally Peraza received further rights from his wife's father and uncle, Guillén and Juan de las Casas, who also owned territories there. He first received dominion of the island of Fuerteventura as a dowry by his father-in-law Juan de las Casas in the 1420s. Then Peraza purchased from the Count of Niebla Enrique de Guzmán the islands of El Hierro and Lanzarote in 1430.

Finally, he obtained the right to most of the remaining islands in 1445 when he traded with Guillén de las Casas his estate in Huévar in exchange for the rights that Guillén had over the lordship of the islands he inherited from his own father Alfonso: Tenerife, La Gomera, La Palma and Gran Canaria. This effectively unified control of most of the Canary Islands under Peraza.

=== Conquest, Consolidation, and the Death of Guillén Peraza ===
Though legally his, Peraza then set about conquering his new territories from their native populations to establish de facto ownership and rule. He then relocated to the islands permanently in 1447 with his son Guillén and three ships. They first took possession of Fuerteventura, where they were initially well received. While Peraza organized his new government of Fuerteventura, he also organized several expeditions to the other islands in search of slaves and valuables with which to pay for the conquest. A ship led by a relative and carrying his son Guillén makes an incursion into La Palma, where the natives defeat the conquerors and Guillén dies. The other two ships, under the command of Basque captain Juan Machín, arrive to El Hierro and capture the daughter of the island king.

The death of Guillén Peraza became a significant and impactful moment in the history of the Canary Islands politically and culturally. It sparked sadness and outrage among nobles in the Castilian mainland and drove his father Hernán to an increasingly brutal repression of the native people. It also inspired the first work of original Spanish literature to come from the Canary Islands, a dirge poem titled Endechas a la muerte de Guillén Peraza ("Laments to the death of Guillén Peraza"). His exact date of death was not recorded, however it can be dated between the second half of 1447 and the first quarter of 1448. His body was believed to be found during an excavation in 1980.

Peraza would continue to struggle with various native groups as well, as well as the Portuguese (in 1450 and in 1452), but otherwise successfully unified the Lordship of the Canary Islands in practice as well as law by the 1450s. In addition to unifying the lordship and establishing the Peraza family in the islands, Hernán the Elder also founded the towns of Valverde and San Sebastián de La Gomera as well as built the historic military structure and landmark now known as “Torre del Conde” - The Tower of the Count.

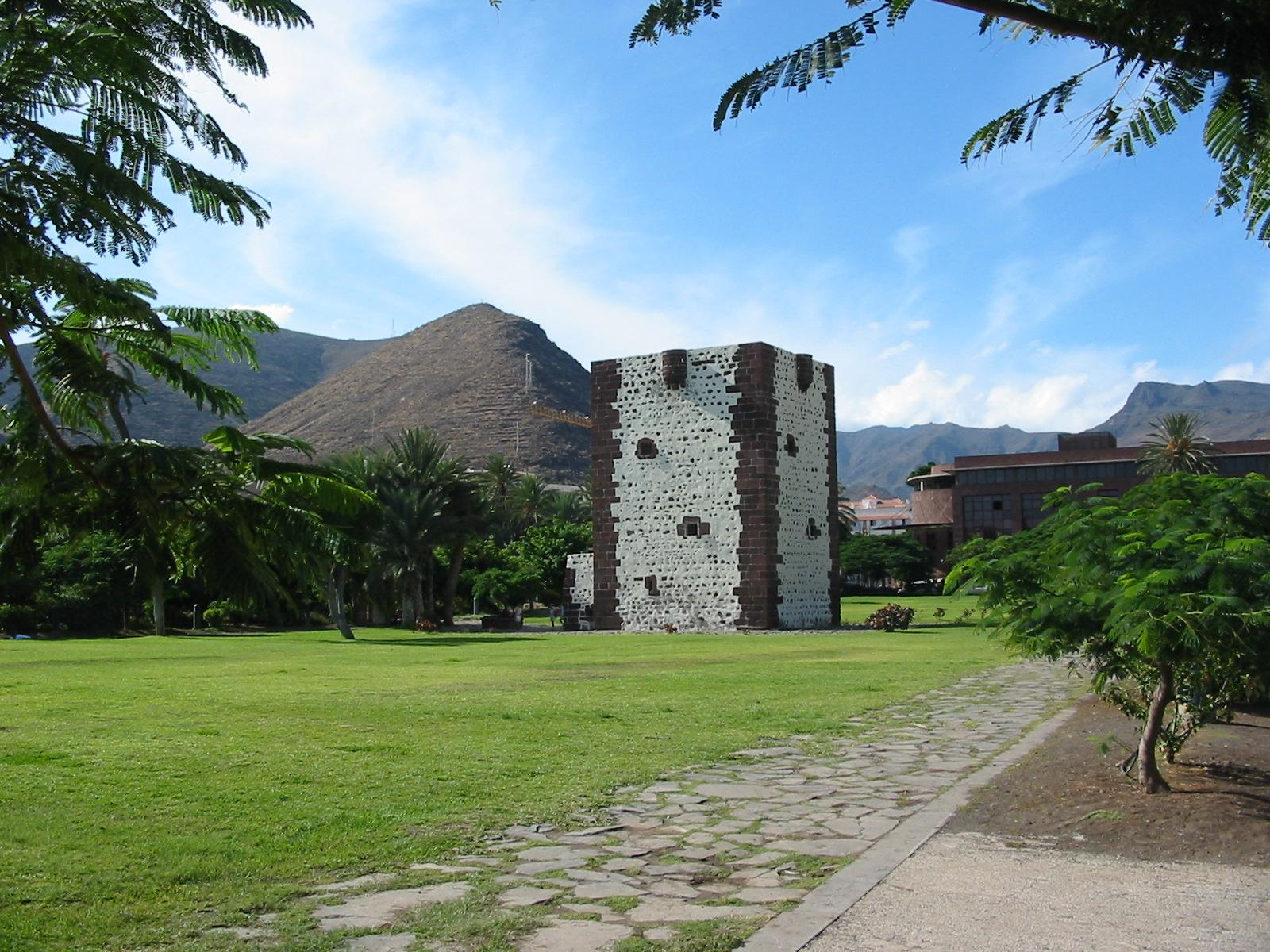
"Torre del Conde," the tower constructed by Hernán Peraza The Elder in 1450.

=== Fragmentation of the Peraza Lordship ===
Due to the previous death of his son Guillén, Hernán Peraza the Elder is succeeded by his daughter Inés Peraza following his death in 1452. After inheriting the unified lordship her father built, Inés styled herself the “Queen of the Canary Islands” for over 20 years until the seigneury was permanently splintered.

In that time Inés and her husband, Diego de Herrera, however, would struggle with the Crown of Castile as well as the Kingdom of Portugal for their rights over the islands. This resulted in numerous lawsuits that both fragmented the Peraza lordship while also reaffirming and securing their claims to certain portions of it. In 1454 the Peraza-Herrera's received from King Enrique IV of Castile the return of the island of Lanzarote to their lordship by way of a court order confirming their ownership. That same year they successfully removed Henry the Navigator from the part of La Gomera that his vassals were occupying. In 1468 Enrique IV was also forced to revoke his concession of the conquest of the unsubmissive islands he had made in favor of several Portuguese nobles in 1464.

Later the Catholic Monarchs had granted Inés and her husband the establishment of a majorat of the islands in 1476, (which later confirmed to their son Hernán Peraza the Younger in 1486). However, following a revolt against the Herrera-Perazas that same year, the islands of La Palma, Gran Canaria and Tenerife were then sold to the Catholic Monarchs in 1477, formally ending Inés’ claim as “Queen of the Canary Islands.” As a result of her tumultuous reign, Inés was the last head of the unified seigneury, though the Peraza family would remain a prominent force in the governing and shaping of the Canary Islands through the following century.

=== Third generation ===
With the sale to the Catholic Monarchs, the lordship of the Peraza-Herrera fiefdom was reduced to the islands of Lanzarote, Fuerteventura, La Gomera and El Hierro. However, increased division began in 1474 as a result of the distribution between their children as they came of age. Pedro, their eldest son, received the island of El Hierro on the occasion of his marriage, and in 1478 their second son, Hernán Peraza the Younger (named after Inés’ father) received La Gomera.

However in 1482, following Pedro's attempts against the life of his parents as well provoking revolts in the family domain, he was disinherited by Inés, who then favored the second-born Hernán The Younger, giving him control of El Hierro as well. His rule was marked by particularly brutal and despotic repression of the native Canarian groups and he was eventually assassinated by one of their leaders in 1488.

In 1502, Inés divided Lanzarote and Fuerteventura into twelfth parts among her other children: Sancho de Herrera, María de Ayala and Constanza Sarmiento - five for Sancho, four for María and three for Constanza.

=== Marriages ===
Another development that improved the prominence of the Peraza family during this period were key marriages that expanded their status for a time, even as their lordship fractured. In the late 1460s Inés's daughter María de Ayala married Diogo da Silva de Meneses, an influential member of the Portuguese court and future Count of Portalegre. This marriage significantly expanded the Peraza's diplomatic alliances beyond Castile to include the Kingdom of Portugal, which further strengthened the key position of the Canary Islands throughout the Age of Discovery as it was the final stop for other conquistadors crossing the Atlantic to the New World in the coming years.

Additionally, in 1482 Hernán Peraza the Younger entered an arranged marriage with Beatriz de Bobadilla y Ossorio. This was a condition for his forgiveness from the Court of Castile for his role in the death of the Captain Juan Rejón. Peraza had to utilize his family's influential connections in the court to secure and negotiate the royal forgiveness following the scandal and lawsuits the death caused. Beatriz de Bobadilla y Ossorio was a problematic Lady of the Court who was notorious for her rumored infamous high-profile affairs, including King Ferdinand II and (later) Christopher Columbus, earning her the nickname La Cazadora - “The Huntress.”

Queen Isabella I personally arranged the marriage between Peraza and Bobadilla, which proved to be significantly advantageous to the Perazas as it joined them with the Bobadilla family, among the most wealthy and powerful in the Kingdom of Spain at the time. Following Hernán Peraza the Younger's death in La Gomera in 1488, his widow Beatriz would succeed him as territorial Lady and ruler of La Gomera and El Hierro. Bobadilla herself was then succeeded by their son, Guillén Peraza de Ayala, who was elevated from a lord to the title of first Count of La Gomera in 1515 by Queen Joanna and Emperor Carlos V.

== Notable members ==
Notable members of the Peraza family include:

- Hernán Peraza Martel (The Elder), first Lord of the unified seigneury of the Canary Islands.
- Guillén Peraza, subject of the first work of original Spanish literature to come from the Canary Islands, the poem Endechas a la muerte de Guillén Peraza ("Laments to the death of Guillén Peraza").
- Inés Peraza de las Casas, self-styled Queen of the Canary Islands, last territorial Lord of the unified seigneury.
- Hernán Peraza de Ayala (The Younger/The Groom), Lord of La Gomera and El Hierro.
- Guillén Peraza de Ayala, First Count of La Gomera.
- Vicente de Peraza (died 1553), grandson of Inés Peraza de las Casas, served as the second Bishop of Panamá (1520–1526).

== See also ==
Bobadilla family Conquest of the Canary Islands History of the Canary Islands
