= Guillén Peraza de Ayala =

Spanish Count and Lord

Guillén Peraza
- Born: Guillén Peraza de Ayala y Rojas c. 1488; Sevilla
- Died: 1565 (77 years old); Madrid
- Other name: Guillén Peraza de Ayala
- Occupations: Count, Territorial lord
- Title: First Count of La Gomera and Lord of El Hierro
- Predecessor: Beatriz de Bobadilla y Ulloa-Ossorio
- Spouse: Beatriz Fernández de Saavedra
- Children: Catalina Peraza de Ayala y Saavedra
- Parent(s): Hernán Peraza The Younger and Beatriz de Bobadilla y Ulloa/Ossorio
- Family: Peraza family

Guillén Peraza de Ayala y Rojas (1488-1565) was a Spanish nobleman and ruler of La Gomera and El Hierro in the Canary Islands.

== Biography ==
Guillén Peraza was born in 1488 in Seville as a member of the Peraza family that was influential in the early history and conquest of the Canary Islands.

His father was Hernán Peraza the Younger, Lord of La Gomera, El Hierro, Fuerteventura, and Lanzarote. His mother was Beatriz de Bobadilla y Ulloa of the prominent Bobadilla family.

Through his high-level family contacts, he was elevated from the title of territorial lord to the first Count of La Gomera in 1515 by Queen Joanna and Emperor Carlos V. He also retained the title of Lord of El Hierro.

== Personal life ==
Peraza married Beatriz Fernández de Saavedra in 1514 and the couple had one child together, a daughter, Catalina Peraza de Ayala y Saavedra the same year. He had a son Baltazar who died in Peru in 1556.

He died in June 1565 in Madrid at the age of 77.
