= Francisca de Gazmira =

Benahoaritan woman (15th century–16th century)

Francisca de Gazmira, also known as Francisca de La Palma or Francisca Palmesa (15th century – 16th century), was a Benahoaritan woman from La Palma island, in the Canary Islands who lived between the 15th and 16th centuries, is known both for her participation in the conquest of her island by the Crown of Castile, acting as a mediator between the indigenous people and the Castilians, and the subsequent christianization of the island, defending the rights of the aboriginal Canary Islanders.

Although she does not appear in the earliest chronicles and histories of the Canary Islands, Francisca de Gazmira was rescued from anonymity by the Austrian historian Dominik Josef Wölfel, who studied Canarian documents stored in the General Archive of Simancas. According to Wölfel, Francisca's role was fundamental in "accelerating the incorporation" of the Canary Islands into Castile, "achieving more rapid pacification and evangelisation of the island", and he presented her as one of the "great architects of the Christianisation of the island and of the peace agreements and treaties made with its natives".

== Life ==
Francisca was born on the island of La Palma sometime in the second half of the 15th century. She belonged to the Gazmira clan, located in the area around the El Riachuelo ravine in El Paso, but no further details about her life are known. Scholars have postulated that she was of noble descent, considering the influence she later had on the Guanche kings.

After the conquest of Gran Canaria was completed in 1483, the new colonists frequently went on raids in search of slaves on the still unconquered islands of La Palma and Tenerife. Francisca, whose indigenous name is unknown, was enslaved in some raid on La Palma, probably before 1488 or immediately after that year, by Francisco Maldonado, governor of Gran Canaria, but certainly before 1491, which does not exclude the possibility that it was by Pedro Fernández de Saavedra, son-in-law of Diego de Herrera and Inés Peraza. Her conversion to Christianity with the name of Francisca de Gazmira granted her freedom from captivity. She was also known as Francisca de La Palma or Francisca Palmesa. Once free, she went on to serve as head maid in the household of Diego de Zurita, conqueror of Gran Canaria and one of the island's first local governors.

=== Role in the christianization of La Palma ===
The local Marian devotion to the Virgin of Candelaria since 1390s and native converts played an important role in the evangelization of the Guanches. She is credited with attracting many Guanches to the new faith with powerful preaching, suggesting to some scholars that the role of women in the old religion was used to advocate Christianity.

=== Role in the conquest of La Palma ===
Although the conquest of La Palma ended in 1493, Gazmira played an important role in the previous processes. Her influence among the Guanche leaders facilitated mediation and dialogue with the Castilian conquerors. Francisca's role as a mediator between the indigenous people and the Castilians began in 1491. At that time, she was sent along with Catalina Palmesa by the authorities of Gran Canaria on a ship to La Palma to bring back a group of twenty Benahoaritas who had been unjustly captured.

Around 1491 or 1492, the Christianized Francisca arrived in La Palma, sent by the governor of Gran Canaria, Francisco Maldonado, and the provisor of the Canary Islands, Pedro de Valdés, to talk with the island's Guanches lords, in response to a previous request from some of them to become Christians. Francisca fulfilled her mission and took five of them to Gran Canaria where they signed a pact of submission with the governor and were baptized in the Cathedral of Las Palmas. They were later returned to La Palma on condition that they would maintain peace in their territories, which freed them from slave raids. When Captain Alonso Fernández de Lugo arrived with his conquering troops at the end of 1492, most of the other lords surrendered peacefully.

Her role in the conquest of the Canary Islands is already described in contemporary sources like in the 1506 Reforma del Repartimiento de Tenerife, by the lawyer Ortiz de Zárate.

=== Indigenous rights activism ===
Gazmira is remembered for her opposition to the enslavement of the Guanches. After the conquest of the island, illegal sales of aborigines as slaves to the Iberian Peninsula took place. Gazmira became the defender of her people, traveling to the court of the Catholic Monarchs to denounce this situation.

In 1494 appeared before the Catholic Monarchs to complain about the savagery of the conquest led by Fernández de Lugo. The monarchs intervened and reduced Fernández de Lugo's power. She also sent letters to monarchs complaining about the existence of mass slave sales and managed to get more than 3,000 slaves returned to the islands after being sold in Jerez.

== Death ==
The date of Francisca de Gazmira's death is unknown, although she does not appear in contemporary documents after the end of 1500, she may have died in 1525 from poisoning.

== Legacy ==
Although her figure has been relegated in some historical accounts, Francisca de Gazmira is increasingly recognized as a key indigenous leader in the history of the Canary Islands. She is considered the first Canary Islander woman to assume a leading role in the political scene of the archipelago.

The character of Francisca also appears in two works of contemporary literary fiction. She is the protagonist of the historical drama by Tomás Monterrey "Francisca de Gazmira (Un drama histórico en tres actos)" and in Carolina-Dafne Alonso-Cortés's novel "El glauco mar de las tinieblas: la conquista de la Islas Canarias", finalist for the Nadal Prize.

== See also ==
- Creator Omnium
