= Diego Garcia de Herrera =

Castilian nobleman

Diego García de Herrera y Ayala (Seville, c. 1417 – Fuerteventura, 22 June 1485) was a Castilian nobleman and Consort-Lord of the Canary Islands. He ceded his rights and those of his wife on the unconquered islands of La Palma, Gran Canaria and Tenerife to the Catholic Monarchs in 1477.

== Biography ==
He was born in Seville around 1417, as third son of Pedro García de Herrera y Rojas, Marshal of Castile and Lord of Ampudia, and María de Ayala y Sarmiento, sister of Pero López de Ayala. He was a councillor of the Seville Council. In 1443 he married Inés Peraza, daughter and heiress of Hernan Peraza the Elder, who at the time of his death in 1453 was Lord of the Canary Islands.

The rights they possessed over the Lordship of the Canary Islands were merely nominal over unconquered Gran Canaria, Tenerife and La Palma, and very insecure on the other islands, due to the insurrection of the natives and the competition of the Portuguese.

Diego de Herrera sued both the Crown of Castile and the Kingdom of Portugal over his rights to the islands as husband of Inés Peraza, Hernán's heiress. In 1454 they obtained from King Henry IV of Castile the return of the island of Lanzarote, which Governor Maciot de Bethencourt had sold unlawfully to Prince Henry the Navigator of Portugal in 1448. In 1454 they also managed to get infante Henry the Navigator to abandon the part of La Gomera occupied by his vassals, and in 1468 the Castilian monarch revoked the concession of the conquest of the unsubmissive islands that he had made in favor of several Portuguese nobles in 1464.

Until 1464, the Lords of the Canary Islands carried out various expansion and conquest projects, in their attempts to incorporate the still unruly islands. To do so, they renewed the construction of fortresses that would serve as a base for commercial exchanges, while also being the basis of a certain political control. Thus, they built the tower of Gando in Gran Canaria and the tower of Añazo in Tenerife. The political role of the towers was reinforced by solemn acts of possession, such as the one held in Tenerife, in which nine Menceys kissed the hand of Diego García de Herrera in a pretended recognition of vassalage. Something similar occurred in Gran Canaria, where they took symbolic possession of the island before a notary in an act celebrated in Las Isletas (1461). Despite these efforts, the towers did not last long, since the excesses of the garrisons provoked their destruction by the Guanches.

In 1476 the inhabitants of Lanzarote revolted against the Lordly power of the couple Herrera-Peraza. The people of Lanzarote asked to be direct vassals of the Crown in the face of the excesses of the Lords, going to court to present complaints and other documents. The Lords of the Canary Islands then began to persecute the rebels, exiling them or executing them, until the Kings sent the judge Esteban Pérez de Cabitos to Lanzarote to collect information on which rights the Lords had over the islands.

In 1477 he was forced to grant capitulations to the Catholic Monarchs, by which in the name of his wife, he ceded to the Crown the rights they had over unconquered Gran Canaria, Tenerife and La Palma, reserving for themselves the islands of Lanzarote, Fuerteventura, El Hierro and La Gomera. The Lords were compensated with five million Maravedíes and with the promise of the title of "Count of La Gomera".

In 1478 Diego de Herrera built a tower called Santa Cruz de la Mar Pequeña at the mouth of the Mar Pequeña river, on the west coast of Africa. It was the first time that the Crown of Castile possessed a territory on that continent.

=== Marriage and children ===
In 1443 he married Inés Peraza de las Casas (c. 1424 - 1503), heiress to the Lordship of the Canary Islands.

They had five children:

- Pedro García de Herrera (c. 1449-1532), first Lord of El Hierro, later disinherited by his parents.
- Hernán Peraza the Younger (c. 1450-1488), first lord of La Gomera and El Hierro. Married to Beatriz de Bobadilla and Ulloa.
- Sancho de Herrera the Elder (c. 1452-1534), first lord of Lanzarote. Married to Violante de Cervantes.
- Constanza Sarmiento, first lady of Fuerteventura. Married to Pedro Fernández de Saavedra.
- María de Ayala, who married Diego de Silva y Meneses, first count of Portalegre since 1496.

Herrera died in Fuerteventura on 22 June 1485 and was buried in the Franciscan convent of San Buenaventura in Betancuria, which he had built at his own expense. The title of Count of La Gomera, which had been promised to him by the Catholic Monarchs in the aforementioned capitulations, was granted to him by Royal Dispatch issued in his name in 1487, when he had already died.

== See also ==
- Conquest of the Canary Islands
