= Francisco de Bobadilla =

Official under the Crown of Castile

The Most Excellent Francisco de Bobadilla
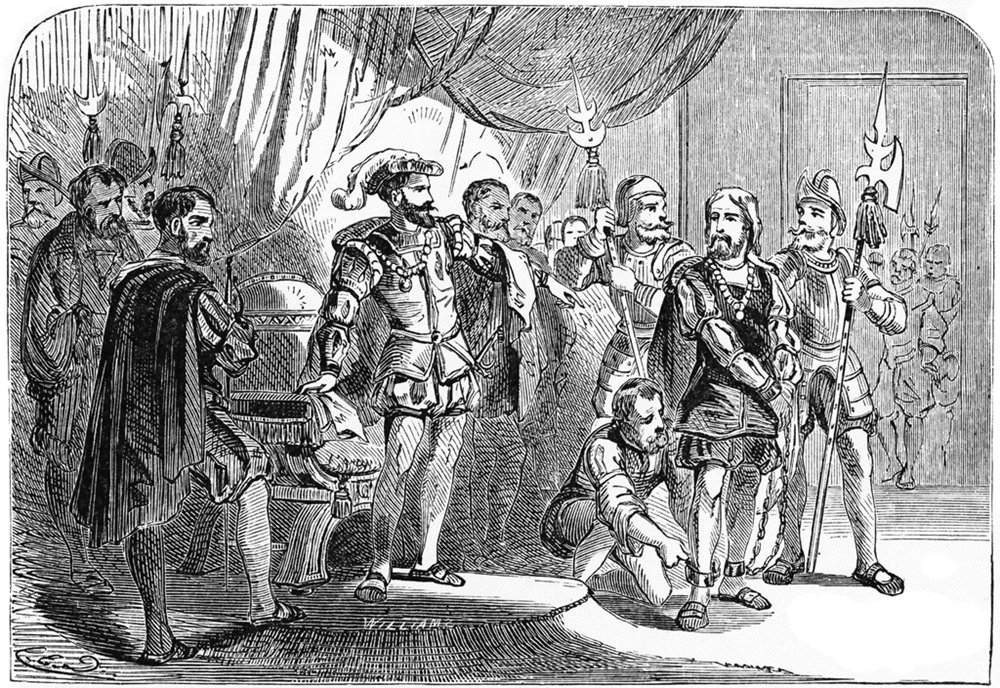
- Francisco de Bobadilla arresting Columbus

3rd Governor of the Indies
- In office August 23, 1500 – April 15, 1502
- Monarch: Catholic Monarchs
- Preceded by: Christopher Columbus
- Succeeded by: Nicolas de Ovando

Personal details
- Born: c. 1448 Kingdom of Castille
- Died: 11 July 1502 (aged 54) Mona Passage
- Relatives: Aunt: Beatriz de Bobadilla, Marchioness Moya Sister: Beatriz de Bobadilla y Ossorio Mother: Leonor Álvarez de Vadillo Father: Juan Fernández de Bobadilla Grandfather: Cristóbal Fernández de Bobadilla

Francisco de Bobadilla (c. 1448 – 11 July 1502) was an official under the Crown of Castile and a knight of the Order of Calatrava. He was also the nephew of Beatriz de Bobadilla, marchioness of Moya and of Peñalosa, a patron of Christopher Columbus and close friend to Queen Isabella. He was sent to the island of Hispaniola as a judge, where he arrested Columbus for official misconduct. He served as Viceroy from 1500 until 1502. He is often mistaken for his uncle with whom he shares a name, Francisco de Bobadilla y Maldonado. He was removed from his post as Governor of the Indies for robbing Spain of gold taxes and overstepping his authority.

== Biography ==
=== Early years ===
Francisco de Bobadilla was born between 1445 and 1450 in Medina del Campo, Valladolid, Kingdom of Castile. In 1480 he was named knight commander of the Order of Calatrava in Auñón, Berninches, Castellanos y El Collado, which indicates that he was between 30 and 35 years old and possessed of some social standing, as this position would not have been given to someone young. In Auñón, residents revolted against his policies, including making attempts on his life.

=== Judge ===
On 21 May 1499, the Catholic Monarchs of Spain named him as a judge with orders to investigate reports from Hispaniola, namely numerous complaints about the policies of Christopher Columbus and his brothers which included accusations that they accepted bribes, enslaved the natives, under-paid the quinto real for pearls and gold, mishandled the rebellion of Francisco Roldán, and that they had committed treason.

=== Investigation of Columbus and his brothers ===
Bobadilla set sail for Hispaniola at the beginning of June, arriving on 23 August 1500. He brought with him 500 men and 14 Amerindians who had previously been Columbus' slaves, and who were now being returned to their home. Once in Santo Domingo he met with Giacomo Columbus, youngest brother of Christopher, who was governing the island at that time because of Christopher being in La Vega. Shortly after the meeting began, Bobadilla ordered Giacomo to leave the fortress in which he was living, but Giacomo refused to recognize Bobadilla's authority, believing his brother Christopher's to be superior.

Francisco de Bobadilla began his investigation, basing it on the accusations that had made their way to the Spanish crown, and he gathered a large number of complaints against Bartholomew, Giacomo, and Christopher. He reputed that their governance had been disastrous, with serious abuses of authority, and was angry at them for hanging five Spaniards who had committed atrocities against the natives. Bobadilla then ordered the arrest of both brothers and that they be taken to Spain. He also seized all assets belonging to the two.

The neutrality and accuracy of the accusations and investigations of Bobadilla toward Columbus and his brothers have been disputed by historians, given the anti-Italian sentiment of the Spaniards and Bobadilla's desire to take over Columbus' position.

Bobadilla Betrays Columbus by Luigi Gregori, c. 1883 (Columbus murals at the University of Notre Dame)

=== Arrest of Columbus and his brothers ===
On Bobadilla's order, Christopher Columbus appeared before him in Santo Domingo in September 1500. Columbus was then jailed in the fortress there together with his other brother Bartholomew Columbus, who had returned to Santo Domingo after a campaign against the natives in Jaragua. At the beginning of October, the pair was sent to Spain in the custody of Captain Alonso de Vallejo. They were then turned over to Juan Rodríguez de Fonseca, who was becoming the informal head of Castile's colonial administration and was a public critic of Christopher. Despite everything, the Monarchs treated Columbus cordially and ordered his release, saying that the accusations against him were insufficient to warrant his imprisonment. They did not exonerate him, however.

Ferdinand Columbus, Christopher's illegitimate second son, was at that time a page to Queen Isabella. He would write in his father's biography that the Catholic Monarchs, seeing various factions in court alleging that payments were not being made and letters sent to Spain from people who were unhappy on Hispaniola, decided to send a judge to investigate what was happening. For Ferdinand, the visit from this judge must have seemed like a great relief for his father, since "the Admiral" seemed to be facing rebellious factions. According to Ferdinand, Bobadilla "recognized and favored the rebels" upon arriving in Santo Domingo, and absolved the population from tribute for 20 years in order to curry their favor.

=== Governor of Hispaniola ===
Francisco de Bobadilla took over the governorship of Hispaniola on 23 August 1500, shortly after his arrival. During his tenure, he incentivized private enterprise and set a policy whereby natives would primarily work in gold extraction in the existing mines in Haina and Cibao. According to Ferdinand Columbus, Bobadilla spent rents and royal tributes in order to win the population's favor, alleging that the Monarchs only wanted to possess the land and were unconcerned about anything else. He further claimed that Bobadilla auctioned off land that Christopher had obtained for the Monarchs below market price and gave natives to various rich and powerful people on the condition that they share their slaves' earnings with him. Bobadilla did cancel mining taxes in a successful attempt to stimulate gold production. Bobadilla also pardoned Francisco Roldán, who had established a competing regime in western Hispaniola in 1497.

=== End of governorship and death ===
In 1502, Bobadilla was replaced as governor of the Indies by Nicolás de Ovando y Cáceres for robbing the monarchs of gold taxes and overstepping his authority in the Indies.

Bobadilla died on 11 July [O.S. 1 July] 1502, while en route to Spain to stand trial for misconduct, during a hurricane that wrecked 20 vessels of the 31-ship convoy, including the flagship. Among the surviving ships was the Aguja, the weakest ship of the convoy and which carried the gold Columbus was owed—spurring accusations that Columbus magically invoked the storm out of vengeance.

== See also ==
- Colonial governors of Santo Domingo
- Pre-1600 Atlantic hurricane seasons
- Spanish West Indies
- Viceroyalty of New Spain

Government offices
Preceded by Christopher Columbus	Viceroy of the Indies; 1500–1502	Succeeded by Nicolás de Ovando
