= Bobadilla family =

The Bobadilla family was one of the wealthiest and most influential families within the Kingdom of Spain, particularly during the Age of Discovery.

== Overview ==
The family had a long history of service and ties to the crown of Castile. They were members of the Spanish nobility with various members holding titles including Lord, Count, and Marchioness.

It was also involved in the conquest and governing of the Canary Islands, Hispaniola, and Cuba. Several of its women in particular would become prominent figures and political leaders. Many members of the family came from the town of Medina del Campo in present-day Castile.

== Notable members ==
The Bobadilla Family
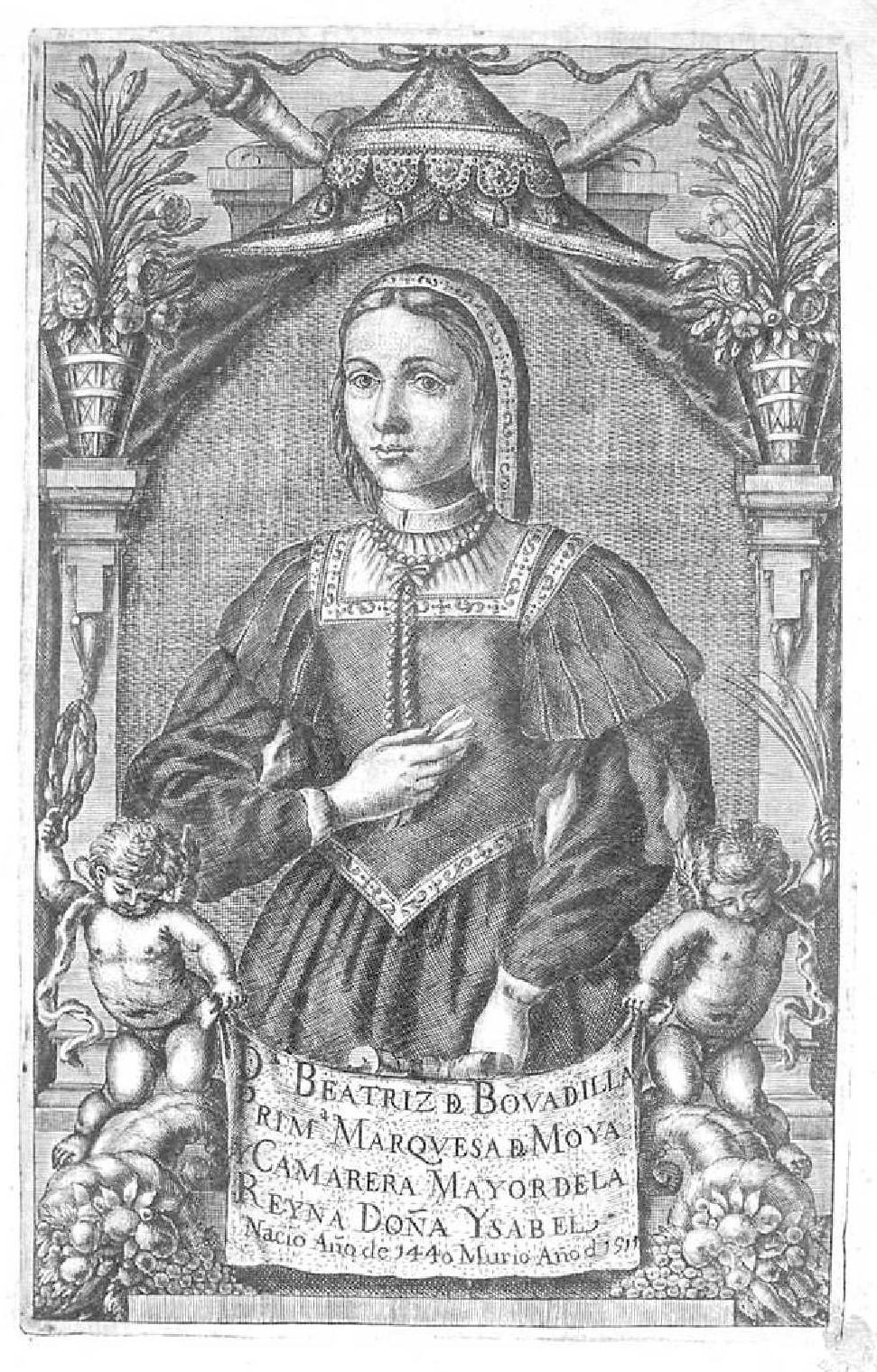
Beatriz de Bobadilla by Diego de Obregón

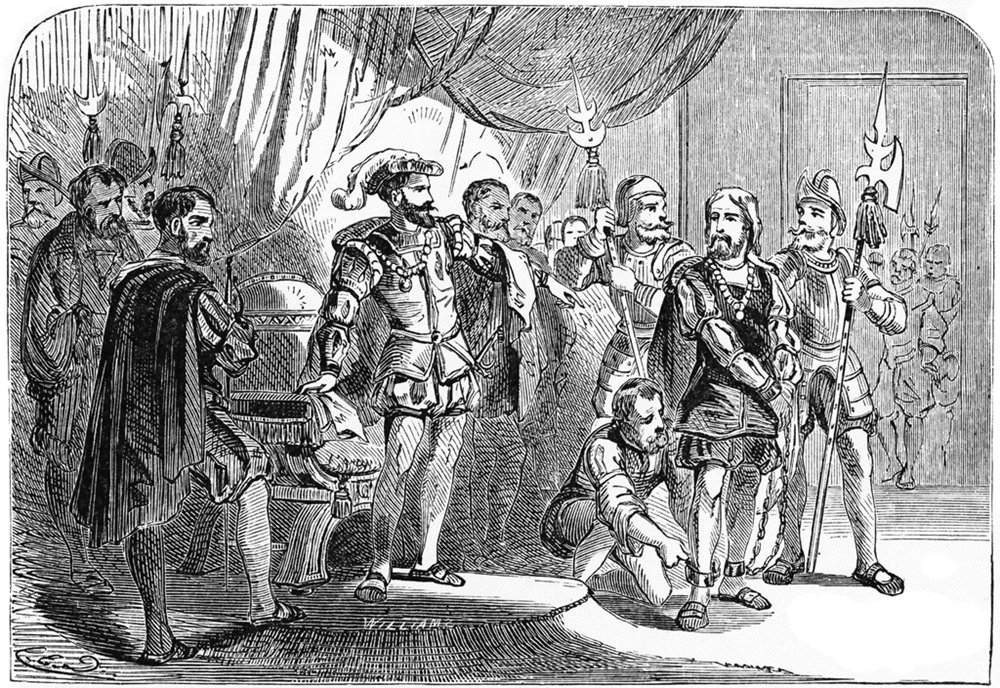
Francisco de Bobadilla with Columbus

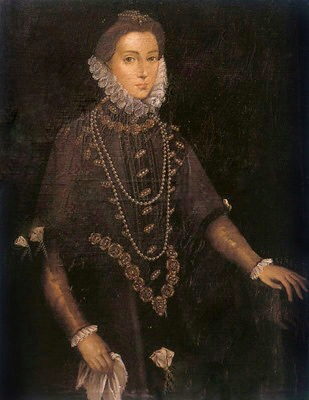
Beatriz de Bobadilla y Ulloa-Ossorio

Notable members of the family include:

- Beatriz de Bobadilla, Spanish marchioness of Moya, close confidant and advisor to Queen Isabella I of Castile
- Francisco de Bobadilla, second Governor of the West Indies after Christopher Columbus
- Beatriz de Bobadilla y Ossorio, Governor of La Gomera and El Hierro
- Isabel de Bobadilla, Governor of Cuba

Their most immediate common ancestor was the Lord Juan Fernández de Bobadilla V, who was born circa 1375. He was grandfather to Beatriz the first and her brother Francisco, great-grandfather to Beatriz the younger, and great-great grandfather to Isabel.
