= Marquess of Moya =

Title in the Peerage of Spain

- Marquis crown
- Creation date: 4 July 1480
- Created by: Isabella I of Spain
- First holder: Andrés Cabrera
- Present holder: Carlos Fitz-James Stuart y Martínez de Irujo

The Marquess of Moya (Spanish: Marqués de Moya) is a title of Spanish nobility that was created on 4 July 1480 by Queen Isabella I in favor of Andrés Cabrera, the Lord of Moya and Chinchón.

== History ==
Andrés Cabrera, Lord of Moya and Chinchón, Knight of the Order of Santiago, steward, advisor and treasurer of King Henry IV of Castile, and supporter of Isabella the Catholic in the War of the Castilian Succession, who had custody of the Alcázar of Segovia (an Alcázar that he handed over to Isabella and Ferdinand at a critical moment of the war that pitted them against the followers of Henry IV and Beltraneja) and was at odds with the Arias-Dávila brothers, especially with the Bishop of Segovia Juan Arias Dávila, paternal uncle of Pedrarias Dávila.

Its name refers to the Cuenca town of Moya, whose Lordship had been given to her by Henry IV in 1463, and his wife was Beatriz Fernández de Bobadilla, head chambermaid and great friend of Isabella the Catholic, of whom it was said that "after the queen of Castile, the Bobadilla".

Beatriz died in Madrid on 17 January 1511 and, months later, on 4 October 1511, her husband Andrés Cabrera died.

Its current title holder is Carlos Fitz-James Stuart y Martínez de Irujo, 19th Duke of Alba.

== See also ==
- Duke of Alba
