= Inés Peraza =

Spanish Territorial Lord

- Born: Inés Peraza de las Casas c. 1424; Seville
- Died: 1503 (79 years old); Seville
- Occupation: Territorial lord
- Title: Lord and Queen of the Canary Islands
- Predecessor: Hernán Peraza the Elder
- Successor: Hernán Peraza the Younger
- Spouse: Diego García de Herrera y Ayala
- Children: Pedro García de Herrera, Hernán Peraza the Younger, Sancho de Herrera the Elder, Constanza Sarmiento, María de Ayala
- Parent(s): Hernán Peraza the Elder and Inés de las Casas
- Family: Peraza family

Inés Peraza de las Casas (Seville, c. 1424 - Seville, 1503) was the territorial lady of the Lordship of the Canary Islands, which she inherited from her father Hernán Peraza the Elder and her late brother Guillén Peraza.

As the first monarch since the islands were unified by her father, Inés titled herself “Queen of the Canary Islands,” which she continued to do until the assignment to the Catholic Monarchs to the islands of La Palma, Gran Canaria and Tenerife in 1477.

== Early life ==
She was born approximately 1424 in Seville to Hernán Peraza the Elder and his wife, Inés de las Casas (for whom she was named), lords of the Canary Islands. Her father's family was influential in Seville as lords and mayors while her mother's ancestry is of French origin.

While her father and brother built a consolidated lordship in the islands, Inés remained in Seville for her early life. She was under the tutelage of the Duke of Medina Sidonia, Don Juan de Guzmán, through 1447. In the next year, 1448, she married her husband, Diego García de Herrera.

== Lordship of the Canary Islands ==
In 1445, Inés's father, Hernán Peraza the Elder, exchanged her late mother's olive estate in Huévar, with her (mother's) uncle, Guillén de las Casas, for the rights that he had over the lordship of the islands of Tenerife, La Gomera, La Palma and Gran Canaria, which Guillén had inherited from his father Alfonso. This was added to the territory Hernán Peraza had already acquired from the Count of Niebla Enrique de Guzmán in 1430 — El Hierro and Lanzarote.

Following the death of her father in 1452, as well as the earlier death of his first-born son Guillén on La Palma (circa 1447/1448), Inés remained the sole heir to the lordship of the islands.

=== Lordship lawsuits ===
Inés and her husband, Diego de Herrera, had to fight with the Crown of Castile as well as the Kingdom of Portugal for their rights over the islands.

Lanzarote had previously been leased by Guillén de las Casas, uncle of Inés Peraza's mother, to Maciot de Bethencourt, relative of the conqueror Jean de Bethencourt in 1432. He, in turn, sold it to Henry the Navigator of Portugal in 1448, however the islanders revolted against Portuguese power, leaving island disputed and considered "kidnapped" by King Juan II.

The year 1454 was significant as the Peraza-Herrera's received from King Enrique IV of Castile the return of the island of Lanzarote to their lordship by way of a court order confirming their ownership. That same year they successfully removed Henry the Navigator from the part of La Gomera that his vassals occupied. In 1468 Enrique IV was also forced to revoke his concession of the conquest of the unsubmissive islands he had made in favor of several Portuguese nobles in 1464.

Later the Catholic Monarchs had granted Inés and her husband the establishment of a majorat of the islands in 1476, which was later confirmed to their son Hernán Peraza the Younger in 1486.

=== Participation in the conquest of Tenerife ===
Inés Peraza participated directly in the conquest of the island of Tenerife, assisting the royal order to the conquering captain Alonso Fernández de Lugo in 1495 with extensive supplies. This aid had been requested by Alonso de Lugo for his second entry into Tenerife, after his army had been defeated by the Guanches in the "Acentejo massacre" the previous year.

Afterwards, as a guarantee, Inés held the children of Lugo Fernando and Pedro as hostages for the substantial debt that amounted to 600,000 maravedí.

=== Canary Islands Lordship Division ===
==== Uprising in Lanzarote ====
In 1476 the inhabitants of Lanzarote revolted against the stately power of the Herrera-Perazas. The people of Lanzarote asked to be vassals of the Catholic Monarchs before the excesses of Inés Peraza and her husband, going to court to file complaints and other documents. The lords of the Canary Islands then began to persecute the rebels, exiling or executing them, until the Kings sent Esteban Pérez de Cabitos, the investigating judge, to Lanzarote to collect information on the lords' rights to the islands.

==== Assignment of the rights of conquest of Gran Canaria, La Palma, and Tenerife ====
In October 1477, Inés and her husband renounced their rights to the islands that had not yet been conquered, transferring them to the Catholic Monarchs in exchange for financial compensation and the title of Count of La Gomera.

==== Further Lordship Division ====
With the sale to the Catholic Monarchs, the lordship of the Peraza-Herrera was reduced to the islands of Lanzarote, Fuerteventura, La Gomera and El Hierro. However, increased division begins in 1474 as a result of the distribution between their children as they came of age. Pedro, the eldest son, received the island of El Hierro on the occasion of his marriage, and in 1478 Hernán Peraza the Younger (named after her father) received La Gomera.

In 1482, in the face of Pedro's attempts against the life of his parents, as well as for provoking revolts in the family domain, he was disinherited by Inés, who then favored the second-born Hernán The Younger, giving him control of El Hierro as well. Following Hernán The Younger's death in La Gomera in 1488, further internal struggles ensued in the family against his ambitious widow Beatriz de Bobadilla (known as “The Huntress”) for control of the islands. Bobadilla would successfully retain ownership of her husband's lands and emerge as ruler of La Gomera and El Hierro. Bobadilla was succeeded by her son, Guillén Peraza de Ayala, who was elevated from a lord to a count.

In 1502, Inés divided Lanzarote and Fuerteventura into twelfth parts among her other children: Sancho de Herrera, María de Ayala and Constanza Sarmiento - five for Sancho, four for María and three for Constanza. She died at the beginning of the following year in her birthplace of Sevilla.

As a result of her tumultuous reign, Inés was the last head of the unified seigneury, though the Peraza family would remain a prominent force in the governing and shaping of the Canary Islands.

== Marriage and Progeny ==
Inés Peraza married Diego García de Herrera y Ayala in Seville in 1448. Herrera was a "Vassal of Her Majesty" and a Thirteenth Knight of the Order of Santiago.

They had five children:

- Pedro García de Herrera (c. 1449-1532), first Lord of El Hierro, later disinherited by his parents.
- Hernán Peraza the Younger (c. 1450-1488), first lord of La Gomera and El Hierro. Married to Beatriz de Bobadilla and Ulloa.
- Sancho de Herrera the Elder (c. 1452-1534), first lord of Lanzarote. Married to Violante de Cervantes.
- Constanza Sarmiento, first lady of Fuerteventura. Married to Pedro Fernández de Saavedra.
- María de Ayala, who married Diego de Silva y Meneses, first count of Portalegre since 1496.

== See also ==
- Peraza family
- Conquest of the Canary Islands
- History of the Canary Islands
