= Beatriz de Bobadilla =

15th-century Spanish noblewoman and courtier

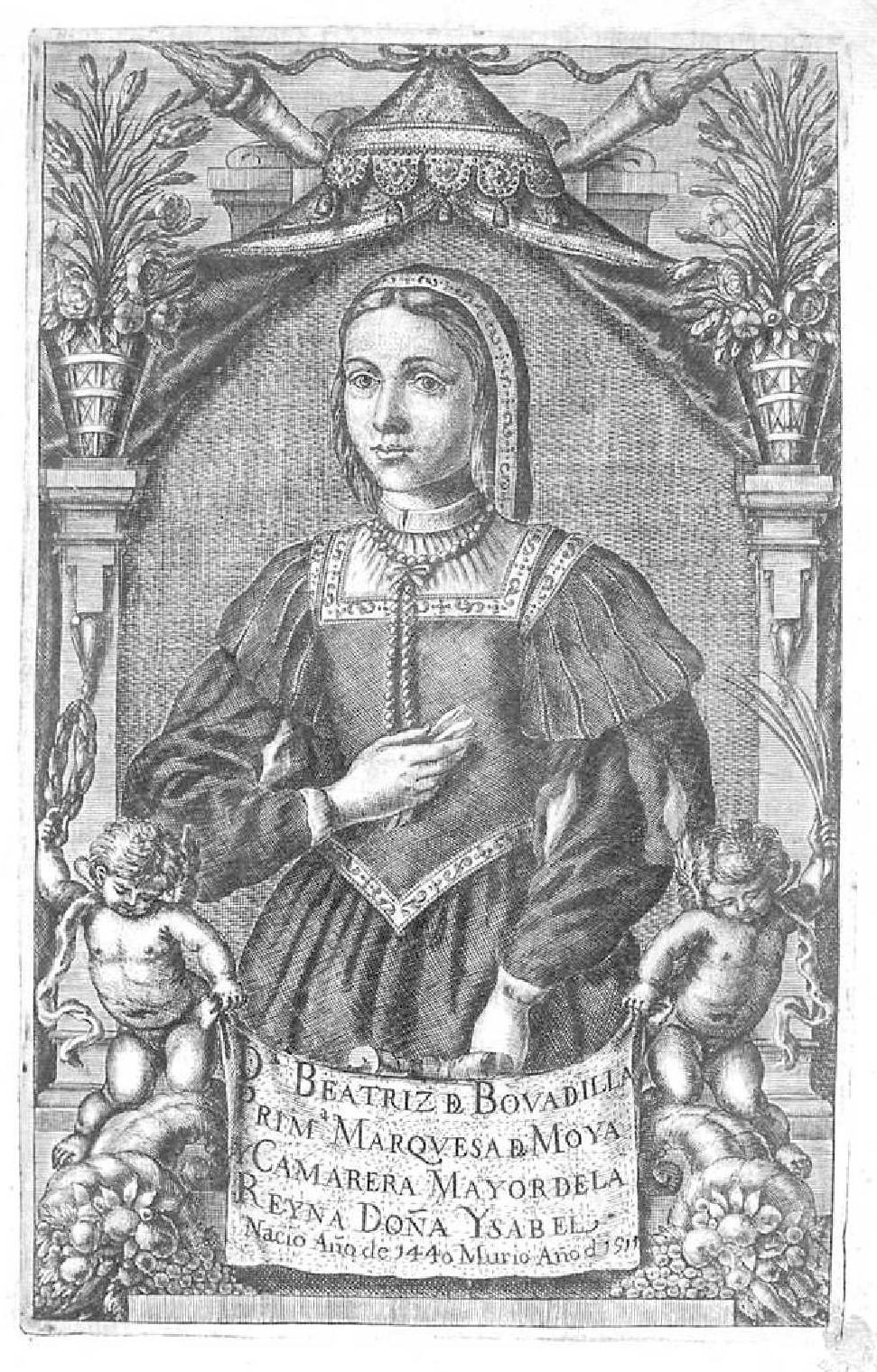
- Depiction by Diego de Obregón
- Born: 1440; Medina del Campo, Kingdom of Castile
- Died: 1511 (aged 70–71); Madrid, Spain

Beatriz de Bobadilla (1440–1511) was a Castilian noble, courtier, and confidant of Queen Isabella I of Castile. She was the childhood friend of Isabella and remained at her court as her adviser throughout her reign, once being subjected to an assassination attempt when mistaken for the queen.

For their service to the crown, in 1480 Bobadilla and her husband Andrés Cabrera were granted the Marquisate of Moya and, in 1489, the lordship of Chinchón.

== Life ==
Beatriz de Bobadilla was born in 1440 to Mosén Pedro de Bobadilla and Beatriz de Corral. Her father was castellan of Arévalo Castle, where Isabel de Trastámara, future Queen regnant of Castile, grew up and was schooled. The two girls became close; as Beatriz was a decade older than Isabella, the former filled the role of an older sibling for Isabella. They would be lifelong friends.

According to apocrypha, during the short-lived betrothal of Isabella to Pedro Girón Acuña Pacheco, many years Isabella's senior and infamously lecherous, Bobadilla is said to have threatened to kill Girón to preserve Isabella's health and happiness.

Bobadilla participated in Henry IV's attempts to keep Isabella and Ferdinand II of Aragon separate. Juan Pacheco convinced Isabella's ladies-in-waiting that the marriage was perilous, as it could deliver Castile into the hands of Ferdinand's father, King John II.

== Family ==
The Bobadilla family was one with a long history of service to the Crown of Castile.

Bobadilla's niece was Beatriz de Bobadilla y Ossorio, Governess of La Gomera, who was known as "the Huntress" for her amorous exploits at the Castilian court. Other prominent relatives include Francisco Fernández de Bobadilla and Isabel de Bobadilla.
