= Juan Rejón =

Spanish explorer

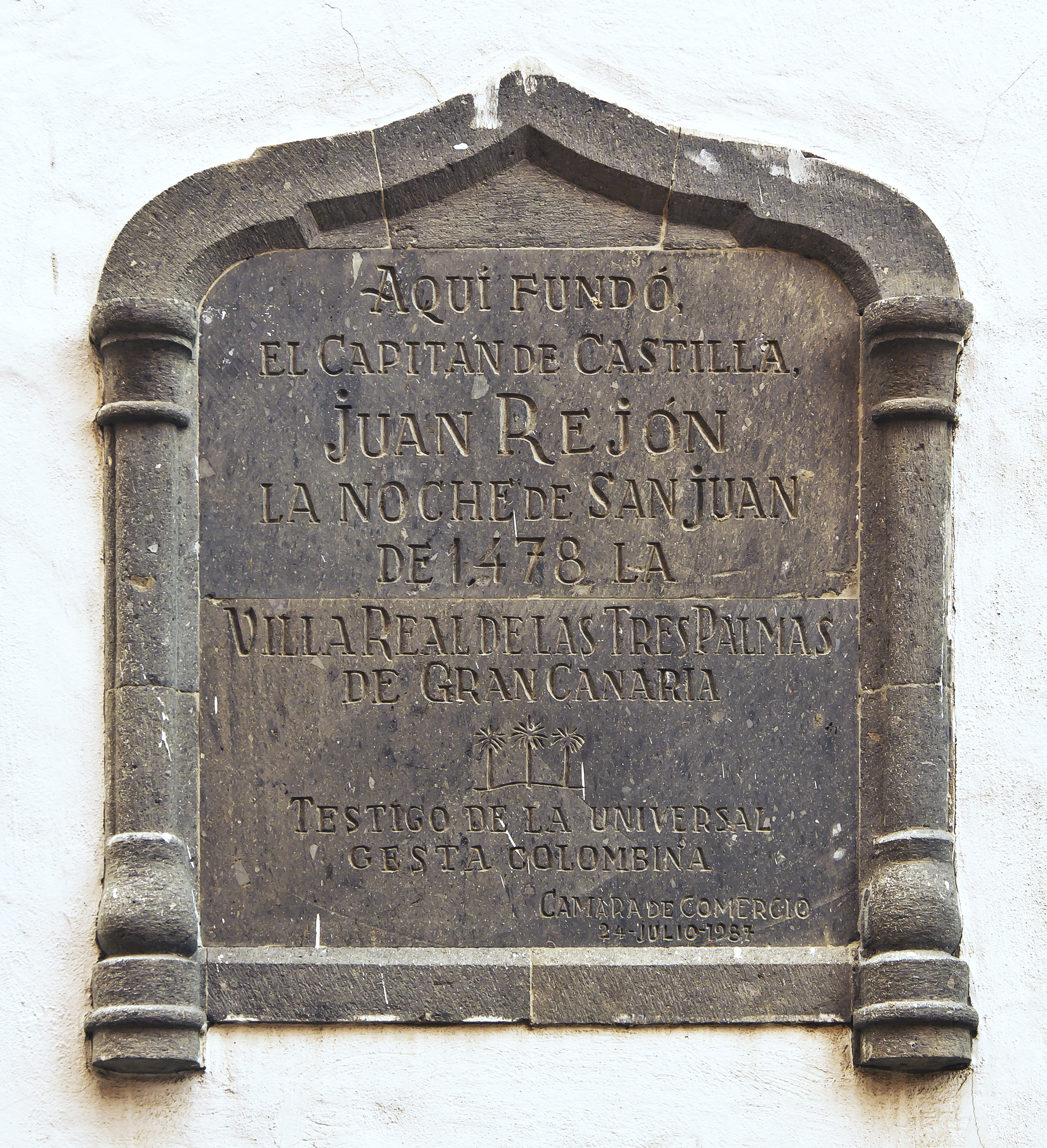
Plaque commemorating the foundation of the city of Las Palmas de Gran Canaria by Juan Rejón. Ermita de San Antonio Abad, district of Vegueta, city de Las Palmas.

Juan Rejón (died 1481) was an Aragonese captain in the service of the Castilian navy, who was appointed by the Catholic Monarchs to participate in the conquest of the Canary Islands. Rejón founded the city of Las Palmas de Gran Canaria.

After being named captain, he recruited a contingent of 600 men, mostly Andalusians. Their number included Alonso Fernández de Lugo, future conqueror of La Palma and Tenerife.

From the Puerto de Santa María, the expedition departed on three ships on 28 May 1478. On 24 June 1478, they disembarked off Las Isletas (today part of the city of Las Palmas de Gran Canaria). Rejón set up camp at a nearby palm grove; this became the nucleus of the city of Las Palmas. Tension and problems with his men, including one of his followers, named Bermúdez, resulted in Rejón being imprisoned and then sent back to Spain by his replacement as governor of Gran Canaria, Pedro de Algaba.

Rejón was taken in chains to the Castilian court. However, he obtained his liberty, returned to the Canary Islands, and ordered the decapitation of Pedro de Algaba and the exile of Bermúdez to the island of Lanzarote.

In 1480, he participated in military operations on the island of La Gomera, not fully conquered by the Castilians. He disembarked with his troops at Hermigua with two goals: to complete the conquest of the island and to meet with Hernán Peraza, the feudal lord of La Gomera. However, Peraza considered Rejón, a commander with many troops operating in territory not controlled by Castile, as a threat to his own power. Peraza sent his own troops to Hermigua. In 1481, Rejón was murdered by one of the vassals of Peraza.

Peraza was forced to explain Rejón's death at court. He was pardoned but had to meet certain conditions. He had to participate in the conquest of Gran Canaria with troops from La Gomera and complete the conquest of the island, a plan that had not been completed by Rejón. Peraza himself was later killed by the Guanche Hautacuperche in 1488.

== Bibliography ==
- Pérez, Marcos Sarmiento (January 2011). "The role of interpreters in the conquest and acculturation of the Canary Archipelago" (PDF). Interpreting. 13 (2): 155–175. doi:10.1075/intp.13.2.01sar.
