= Torre del Conde =

Torre del Conde (Count's Tower)
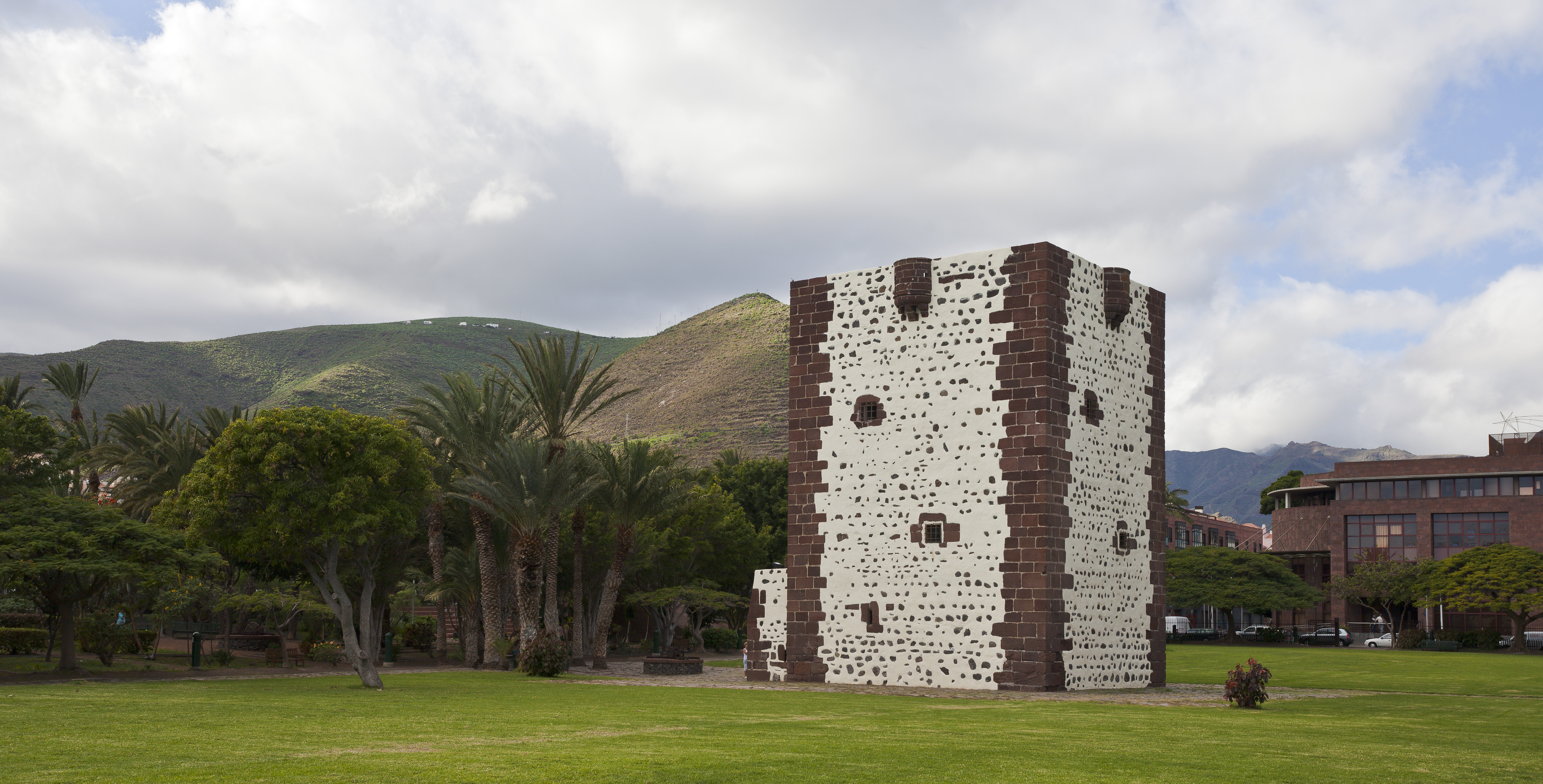

- Location within Canary Islands Location within Spain
- 28°05′26″N 17°06′42″W
- Location: San Sebastián de La Gomera, Spain

History
- Built: 1447 - 1450

Site notes
- Architectural style: Gothic

Spanish Cultural Heritage
- Official name: Torre del Conde
- Criteria: Monument
- Designated: 13 December 1990
- Reference no.: RI-51-0006884

Torre del Conde is a fortress from the 15th century located in the Villa de San Sebastián de La Gomera (Canary Islands, Spain). It is a military-type building. Its function was mainly of representation of the manorial power, and it counted on the lack of modern weapons on the part of the natives. Its location next to the port at some distance from it, with no place for firearms and at the bottom of a valley, confirms this theory.

It was ordered to be built by the Count of La Gomera Hernan Peraza the Elder between 1447 and 1450, and the stately elites of La Gomera took refuge there during the Rebellion of the Gomeros. Possibly at that time it was the center of a larger group of temporary or minor fortifications.

Of the towers built during the Conquest of the Canary Islands (Añazo, Gando, etc.), it is the only one that is preserved today.

It is in the late Gothic style, it has a prismatic shape, 15 meters high, and about 40 meters in perimeter, with walls two meters thick. It is whitewashed, with red stone blocks in the corners. It has the honor of being the southernmost medieval (specifically Gothic) construction that we have news of.

Its original design underwent several reforms, with Jacome Pelearo Fratin and Leonardo Torriani. Some of its most illustrious guests have been Christopher Columbus, Amerigo Vespucci and Hernán Cortés. It was declared a Historic-Artistic Monument on 13 December 1990. It was declared a Bien de Interés Cultural (Asset of Cultural Interest) according to the Order of 2 July 1993.
