= Conquest of the Canary Islands =

15th-century Spanish conquest and genocide

- Location of the Canary Islands

The Crown of Castile conquered the Canary Islands place between 1402 and 1496 in two periods: the Conquista señorial, carried out by Castilian nobility in exchange for a covenant of allegiance to the crown, and the Conquista realenga, carried out by the Spanish crown itself during the reign of the Catholic Monarchs. It has been described as the first instance of European settler colonialism in Africa, as well as a genocide due to the brutal treatment of the Islands' indigenous Guanches which contributed to their extinction as a distinct group.

== Introduction ==
The ties between the Canaries and the Mediterranean world which had existed since antiquity were interrupted by the decline and fall of the Western Roman Empire. Although these linkages were weakened, they were not totally severed, and the Canaries' isolation was not total. During the Middle Ages, the first reports on the Canaries come from Arabic sources, which refer to some Atlantic islands which may have been the Canaries. What does seem clear is that this knowledge of the islands did not signify the end of the cultural isolation of the native inhabitants.

Visits to the archipelago began to increase after the end of the 13th century for reasons including:

- The economic expansion of some European states, such as the Republic of Genoa, the Crown of Aragon, the Kingdom of Castile, and the Kingdom of Portugal. These states were already engaging in maritime trade along the Moroccan coast.
- Development of new navigation techniques (compass, astrolabe, stern rudder, cog-caravel) and the development of cartography: a portulan map by Angelino Dulcert of Majorca, from 1339, is the first to show some of the Canary Islands, and this date might in fact coincide with the effective rediscovery of the islands by the Genoese seaman Lanzarotto Malocello. The first expedition to visit all the islands of the archipelago took place two years later, in 1341, under the command of fellow Genoese seaman and explorer Niccoloso da Recco, at the service and on behalf of Portuguese king Afonso IV.
- Ideological and political motives: the monarchies of Southern Europe entered an expansive phase. In the case of the Iberian monarchies, their territorial expansion was spurred by the reconquista ("reconquest") of Moorish southern Spain (al-Andalus). For this reason, territorial expansion represented a reinforcement of royal power, imbued with crusader and missionary spirit.

== Pre-Conquest ==
In the 14th century, a variety of forces competed for control of the Canaries: Genoese, Majorcan, Portuguese and Castilian. In the following century, Castile and Portugal were the primary contenders.

=== Genoese phase ===
The first visit by a European to the Canary Islands since antiquity was by Genoese captain Lanceloto Malocello traditionally dated 1312 (but probably a little later, between 1318–1325). Malocello's motives were unclear – it is believed he might have been searching for traces of the Vivaldi brothers who had disappeared off Morocco, around Cape Non back in 1291. (Note: It is believed that the Canary island of Alegranza was named after Allegrancia, one of the two galleys of the Vivaldi brothers.) Malocello made landfall (possibly shipwrecked) on Lanzarote island, and remained there for nearly twenty years. Malocello may have attempted to erect himself as a ruler among the aboriginal peoples and been eventually expelled by them.

According to some sources, shortly after his return to Europe, in 1336, Malocello led a return expedition to the Canaries, sponsored by the Portuguese crown. However, the existence of this expedition has been dismissed by most modern historians, as being based on later forged documents.

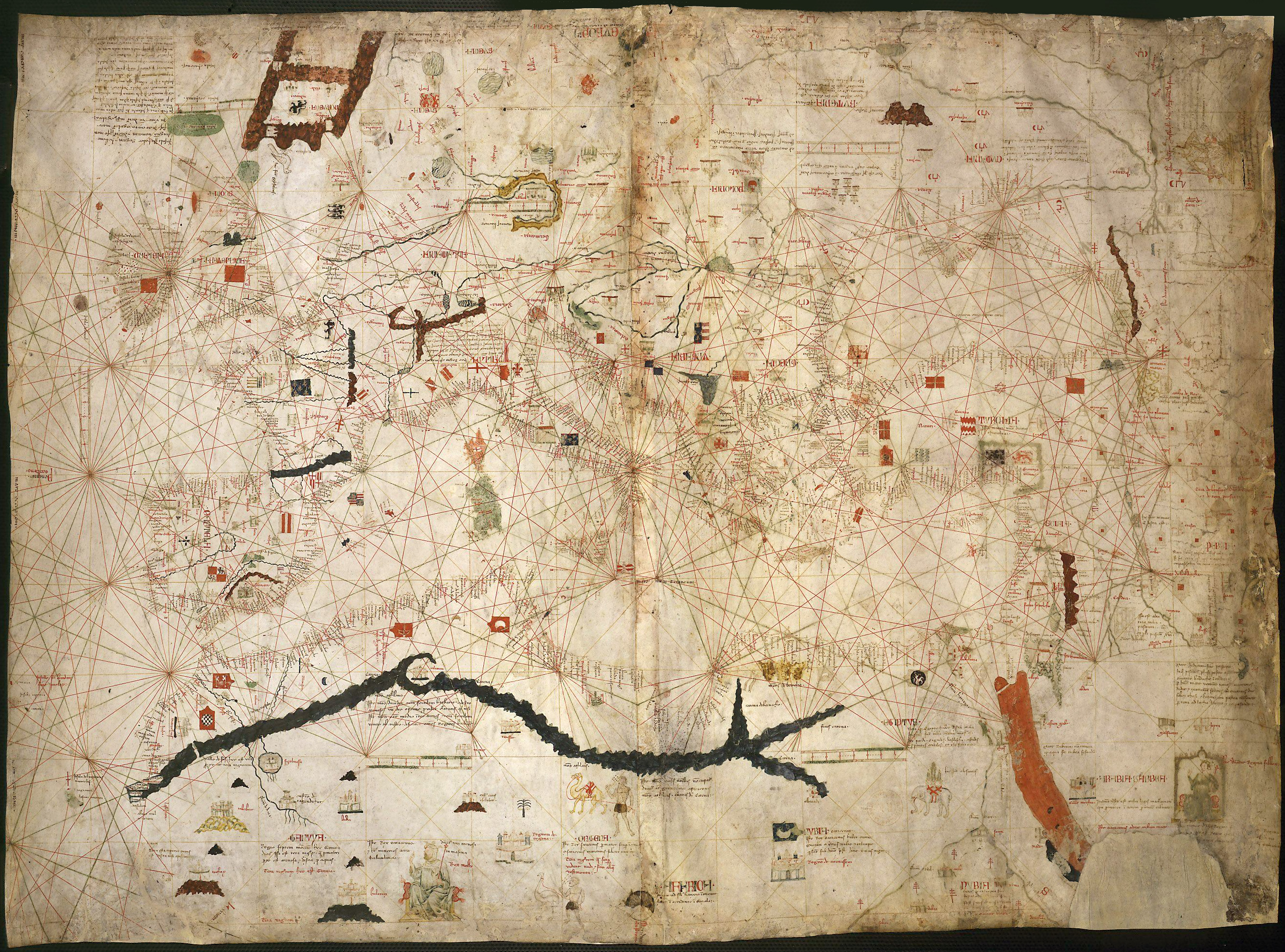
Portolan of Angelino Dulcert (1339) showing Lanzarote island

Evidently drawing from the information provided by Malocello, in 1339 appeared the portolan map by Angelino Dulcert of Majorca showing the Canary island of Lanzarote (named Insula de Lanzarotus Marocelus and marked by a Genoese shield), as well as the island of Forte Vetura (Fuerteventura) and Vegi Mari (Lobos). Although earlier maps had shown fantastical depictions of the "Fortunate Islands" (on the basis of their mention in Pliny), this is the first European map where the actual Canary islands make a solid appearance (although Dulcert also includes some fantastic islands himself, notably Saint Brendan's Island, and three islands he names Primaria, Capraria and Canaria).

In 1341, a three-ship expedition sponsored by King Afonso IV of Portugal, set out from Lisbon, commanded by Florentine captain Angiolino del Tegghia de Corbizzi and Genoese captain Nicoloso da Recco, and employing a mixed crew of Italians, Portuguese and Castilians. Cruising the archipelago for five months, the expedition mapped thirteen islands (seven major, six minor) and surveyed the indigenous inhabitants, the 'Guanches', bringing back four natives to Lisbon. (Note: The 1341 expedition is related by Giovanni Boccaccio "De Canaria et insula reliquis, ultra Ispaniam, in occeano noviter repertis".) (This expedition would become the basis of later Portuguese claims of priority on the islands.)

=== Cerda lordship ===
European interest in the Canaries picked up quickly after the 1341 mapping expedition. The descriptions of the primeval Guanches, in particular, drew the attention of European merchants, who immediately saw the prospect of new and easy slave-raiding grounds. In 1342, at least two Majorcan expeditions, one under Francesc Duvalers, another under Domenech Gual, assembled by private merchant consortia with a commission from Roger de Robenach (representative of James III of Majorca) set out for the Canary Islands. Some speculate as many as four or five expeditions were commissioned in Majorca in 1342. The results of these expeditions are uncertain.

The Catholic Church was also drawn by the news. In 1344, the Castilian-French noble Luis de la Cerda (Count of Clermont and Admiral of France), then serving as a French ambassador to the papal court in Avignon, submitted a proposal to Pope Clement VI, offering the Church the more palatable vision of conquering the islands and converting the native Canarians to Christianity. In November 1344, Pope Clement VI issued the bull Tuae devotionis sinceritas granting the Canary islands in perpetuity to Luis de la Cerda and bestowing upon him the title of sovereign "Prince of Fortuna". The pope followed this up with another bull, in January 1345, giving the projected Cerda-led conquest and conversion of the islands the character of a crusade, granting indulgences to its participants, and papal letters were dispatched to the Iberian monarchs urging them to provide material assistance to Cerda's expedition. The Portuguese king Afonso IV immediately lodged a protest, claiming priority of discovery, but conceded to the authority of the pope. Alfonso XI of Castile also protested, claiming that, by the ancient Visigothic dioceses and prior reconquista treaties, the islands fell within the Castilian jurisdiction and 'sphere of conquest', but nonetheless recognized Cerda's title.

Preparations for the Cerda expedition were stalled by the opposition of the Iberian monarchs – despite their formal concessions to Cerda's title, they did not facilitate the organization of his expedition. As a result, no expedition to the Canary islands was mounted before Luis de la Cerda's death on 5 July 1348. By the terms of the 1344 contract, the lordship of Fortuna was set to expire after five years without an expedition (although Cerda's heirs, the Counts of Medinacelli would later revive their claim).

=== Majorcan-Catalan phase ===
With Cerda out of the picture, former parties resumed their adventures. However, records over the next generation are few and far-between. There are notices of three further expeditions by Majorcans (now annexed by Aragon since 1344) to the area – the famed expedition of Jaume Ferrer in 1346 (aiming to reach the "River of Gold", i.e. Senegal, on the African coast, but may have touched the Canaries on the way), the expedition of Arnau Roger to Gran Canaria in 1352, and a royal-sponsored patrol expedition by Joan Mora in 1366. There were doubtless many unrecorded expeditions, not only by Majorcans, but also likely by merchants of Seville and Lisbon. These would have been almost wholly of commercial character, many with the purpose of capturing native islanders to sell as slaves in European markets. But there was also some peaceful trade with the locals, particularly for orchil and dragon's blood, which grew wildly on the islands and were much valued as dyes by the European cloth industry.

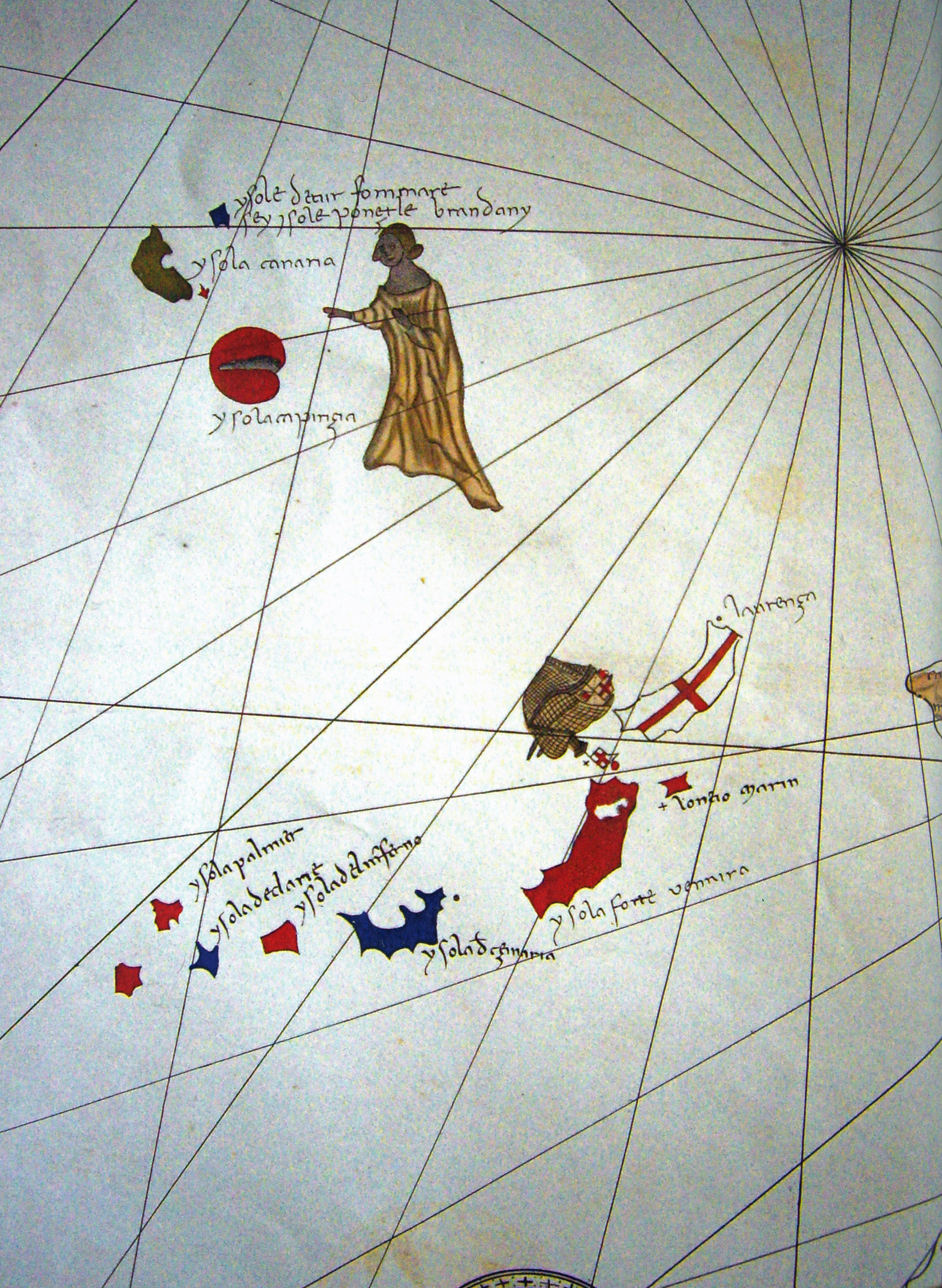
Canary islands in Pizzigani brothers chart (1367)

Despite the failure of the Cerda project, the pope did not give up on his hope of converting the natives. In 1351, Pope Clement VI endorsed an expedition by Majorcan captains Joan Doria and Jaume Segarra, with the object of bringing Franciscan missionaries, including twelve converted Canarian natives (apparently seized by previous Majorcan expeditions), to the islands. (Note: Pope Clement VI's bull Dum diligenter (15 May 1351) granting indulgences to Doria and Segarra.) Whether this expedition ever set out is uncertain, although it was most probably enveloped in Arnau Roger's expedition of 1352. Apocryphal legend relates the Majorcan missionaries succeeded in establishing an evangelizing center at Telde on Gran Canaria until they were massacred by the natives in 1354.

To encourage the missionaries at Telde the pope had erected the 'Diocese of Fortuna' in 1351, but this seems to have remained a paper appointment. Papal interest in the Canaries waned following the death of Pope Clement VI in late 1352. For the next generation, there is practically no information about the Canary islands. It is probable Majorcan-Catalan kept up their commercial interest, focused on Gran Canaria, but records are scant.

The next we hear of the Canary islands is in 1366, when King Peter IV of Aragon commissioned the captain Joan Mora to patrol the Canary islands to assert Catalan sovereignty and patrol for interlopers. Although there was still no project of conquest, interest in missionary establishments seemed to pick up again. The Avignon Pope Urban V issued a bull in July 1369 erecting the Diocese of Fortuna and appointing Fr. Bonnant Tari as bishop, and followed it up with bull of September 1369 instructing the bishops of Barcelona and Tortosa to dispatch 10 secular and 20 regular clergy to preach to the Canarians in their native languages. (Note: Pope Urban V's bull Intercaetera erecting the bishopric was issued 2 July 1369; the bull Ad Hoc Semper instructing Barcelona & Tortosa was issued 30 September 1369.) Whether this actually set out or just remained a paper project is also uncertain. We have a more reliable record of a Majorcan expedition in 1386 carried out by 'Pauperes Heremite', sponsored by Peter IV Aragon and Pope Urban VI. Although their exact fate is unknown, there is a later report that thirteen "Christian friars" who had been preaching in the Canaries "for seven years" were massacred in an uprising during 1391. (Note: Reported by Gadifer de la Salle.) At least five missionary expeditions would be sent (or at least planned) between 1352 and 1386.

Catalan Atlas (1375)

Geographic knowledge of the Canary islands coalesced with these expeditions. Eight of the Canary islands, including La Gomera and El Hierro, are depicted in the 1367 portolan chart of the brothers Domenico and Francesco Pizzigano. A few years later, the Catalan Atlas of 1375 shows the Canaries almost completely and accurately mapped (only La Palma is missing). The eleven islands are named in the Catalan Atlas (from east to west) as Graciosa (La Graciosa), laregranza (Alegranza), rocho (Roque), Insula de lanzaroto maloxelo (Lanzarote), insula de li vegi marin (Lobos), forteventura (Fuerteventura), Insula de Canaria (Gran Canaria), Insula del infernio (Tenerife), insula de gomera (La Gomera), insula de lo fero (El Hierro). The name 'tenerefiz' is first given alongside 'Infierno' in the 1385 Libro del Conoscimiento.

=== Portuguese phase ===
During the 1370s, when Portugal and Castile were engaged in the dynastic Fernandine Wars that followed the assassination of Peter I of Castile, Portuguese and Castilian privateers were dispatched against each other, several of which made detours to the Canary islands for shelter or slave-raiding jaunts.

In the first indication of a conquest project since 1344, King Ferdinand I of Portugal granted in 1370 the islands of Lanzarote and La Gomera to the adventurer 'Lançarote da Franquia' (believed by some to be none other than the impossibly-aged Lanceloto Malocello). (Note: Ferdinand I's grant of Nossa Senhora a Franca (Lanzarote) and Gomeira (La Gomera) (June 1370). The hypothesis that 'Lançarote da Franquia' was the elderly Lanceloto Malocello is principally due to Verlinden (1958), but this would make Malocello at least a nonagenarian. To reconcile the age, Verlinden disputes the authenticity of the 1312 expedition, claiming that Malocello was never marooned on Lanzarote 'for two decades', that Malocello's first trip to the Canaries was in fact the leading the murky Portuguese expedition of 1336. Another hypothesized identity for Lancerote de Framqua is Lançarote Pessanha, admiral of Portugal.) Lançarote da Franquia made an attempt to seize the islands and is reported to have engaged in fighting with "Guanches and Castilians" there by 1376, but it seems the effort at establishing a Portuguese foothold faltered after Lançarote's death in 1385. (Note: The attempt is recorded in Ferdinand I's letter of 1376. A later letter dated 1385 notes that 'Lançarote da Franquia' died in the Canaries and his titles were inherited by his son 'Lopo Affonso da Franquia', suggesting the Portuguese claimant might have succeeded in establishing some sort of presence there. Jean de Bethencourt, in Le Canarien refers to finding "an old castle, which was said to have been built by Lancelot Maloisel" (Ch. 32 in 1872 Hakluyt edition, ch.28 in 1886 Margry edition), which some historians have taken to be probably the remnants of the recent Portuguese fortress of Lançarote da Franquia, that got confused with the much older Genoese adventurer Lanceloto Malocello.)

=== Castilian phase ===
Interest in the Canary islands seems to have been principally the province of the Majorcan-Aragonese in the 1340s–60s (focused on Gran Canaria), and the Portuguese in 1370s–80s (focused on Lanzarote). There are faint references to Castilian adventurers before, but it is only really after 1390 that interest picked up and Castile finally brought its weight to bear.

In 1390, Gonzalo Peraza Martel, Lord of Almonaster, a notable of Seville, requested permission from King Henry III of Castile to conquer the Canary Islands. (Note: Abreu Galindo (1632), p. 60 identifies the 1390 petitioner as "Hernan Peraza" who is also alleged to have undertaken an apocryphal visit to Lanzarote in 1385. There is speculation that Hernan may have been a relative of Gonzalo. However, modern historians have discounted this as an error, and that the 1390 petitioner was Gonzalo Peraza, but that his name was confused with his more famous son, Hernan Peraza, future lord of the Canary islands.) The Castilian grandee Juan Alonso de Guzmán, Count of Niebla, joined his name to the effort.

Five ships were prepared, crewed by Andalusians from Seville and Basque adventurers from Vizcaya and Guipuzcoa, and set off from Cadiz in 1393. The Almonaster expedition sailed through the Canary islands, examining the coasts of Fuerteventura, Gran Canaria, Hierro, Gomera and Tenerife, before finally deciding to land and raid Lanzarote. The Almonaster raid on Lanzarote took some 170 native inhabitants captive, including the local Guanche king and his queen, along with plenty of skins, wax and dyewood, which they sold in Seville for a small fortune. Upon their return to Castile, Almonaster and Niebla presented their captives and goods before Henry III, and reported that the Canary islands were easy to conquer and very profitable. This whet the appetites of other adventurers. (Note: There is some confusion on dates. Castilian royal chronicler Pedro Lopez de Ayala (c. 1400: Cron del rey don Enrique III, Ano.3, ch.20) and Spanish Indies chronicler Lopez de Gomara (1552: ch.222) identifies the date of this expedition as 1393 (but don't name the captain). Abreu Galindo (1632), p. 24 and Viera Clavijo (1772), p. 191 agree there was a 1393 raid by "Sevillans and Biscayans" (with no named captain). But Galindo (p.24) asserts there was an earlier raid in 1385 by "Hernan Peraza" with the same result, while Viera y Clavijo (p.279) asserts there was a later raid by "Sevillans and Biscayans" under Almonaster in 1399, also with the same features. Modern historians have discounted these expeditions of 1385 and 1399 as apocryphal and confused re-tellings of the same expedition, and asserted that historically there was only one expedition of "Sevillans and Biscayans", that led by Almonaster in 1393 (e.g. Jiménez de la Romera (1868), p. 37; Bonnet Reverón (1946), Diffie & Winius (1977), p. 42n, Fernández-Armesto (2007), p. 175)

=== Apocryphal expeditions ===
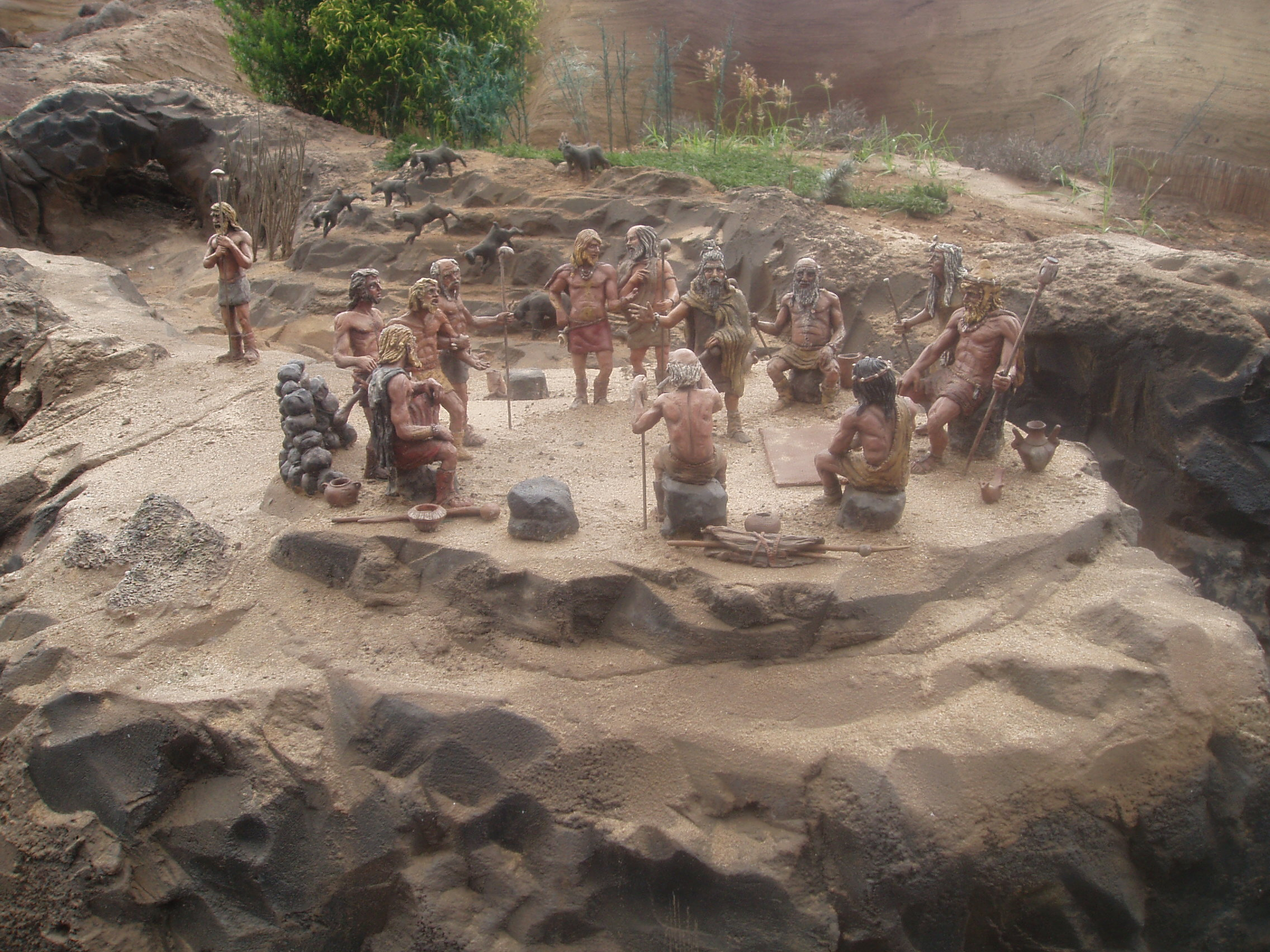
Reconstruction of a Guanche council

There were several other reputed expeditions to the Canary Islands during the 14th Century, first reported by Fr. Juan de Abreu Galindo (1632), some of them in Viera y Clavijo (1772), drawing primarily from local Canarian legends, that have since been determined to be apocryphal or confounded with other expeditions. (Note: The determination of their veracity has been exhaustively reviewed by Bonnet Reverón (1946). See Diffie & Winius (1977), p. 42n.) Among those deemed purely legendary are:

1. A 1360 Majorcan expedition of two ships, captain unknown (alleged in legend to be the same Aragonese galleys prepared for Cerda back in 1344). Upon making landfall at La Gomera or Gran Canaria, the Europeans were defeated and taken prisoner by the native Canarians. After a certain period of time living among the Canarians (possibly a few years), the native chieftains secretly decided to kill all the prisoners. The entire crew, including the clerics (two Franciscan friars according to Abreu de Galindo, five says Viera y Clavijo), were swiftly rounded up and massacred by the Canarians (probably confused with 1351 Majorcan expedition). (Note: Originally reported in Abreu Galindo (1632), p. 22 and Viera Clavijo (1772), p. 274; see also Jiménez de la Romera (1868), p. 36.)
2. A 1372 expedition by 'Fernando de Castro' (Galician, not his Portuguese namesake), who also made landing at La Gomera. After engaging in hostilities, Castro was defeated by the natives, but (unlike the 1360 expedition), the surviving Europeans were magnanimously spared and allowed to embark back to Iberia. Tradition claims that at the behest of the local king Amalahuige, Castro (or Ormel later) left behind his chaplain to convert his people to Christianity. (Note: Only reported in Viera Clavijo (1772), pp. 277–278, who insinuates it is possibly the same as the 1386 expedition of Ormel. Diffie & Winius (1977), p. 42 suggests this could be just a misdated and mangled re-telling of the expedition of Galician-Portuguese captain Fernando de Castro to conquer Gran Canaria in 1424, which had a similar outcome.)
3. The famous tale of the Biscayan privateer Martín Ruiz de Avendaño, who took shelter on Lanzarote in 1377, and, during his stay, slept with the queen Fayna, wife of native king Zonzamas. This liaison produced a daughter Ico, who went on to marry the next king Guanarame and produce a son, Guadarfia. After Guanarame's death, Guadarfia's ascension to the throne was blocked by suspicions that his mother Ico (Avendaño's daughter) was not of noble lineage, until she was put through a trial by ordeal (being smoked in hut, and survived). (Note: Story originally from Abreu Galindo (1632), p. 34. Also reported in Viera Clavijo (1772), pp. 191-92. Abreu Galindo asserts the heir of Zonzamas was Tiguafaya, who was in turn succeeded by his brother Guanarame, and that Ico was their sister (and wife of Guanarame). Abreu Galindo asserts that Tiguafaya and his queen were taken captive during the "1385" [sic] raid on Lanzarote by Hernan Peraza [sic], leaving Guanarame to succeed, and upon Guanarame's death, Ico's son Guadarfia was the heir. Viera y Clavigo (1772) confusingly says king Tinguafaya was taken captive twice – in 1393 (p. 191) and again in 1399 (p. 280). Besides the contradictions on dates and names, the original Avendaño story is suspect principally on account of age – king Guadarfia of Lanzarote was an adult when he met Jean de Bethencourt in 1403, making it unlikely he could have been a grandson stemming from Avendaño's visit in 1377. The trial by ordeal (told in Viera Y Clavigo, pp. 192–193) involved an element of human sacrifice (frequently reported in Guanche culture): Ico was placed in a sealed hut with three common village women, and fires were set and the smoke pumped into it; the determination that she was of noble blood was assessed by the fact that the three commoners suffocated to death, whereas Ico survived. Her survival is credited to an old woman who secretly gave her a wet sponge to place over her mouth.)
4. A 1382 ship from Seville, commanded by Francisco Lopez, wrecked off Guinigada (Gran Canaria), with 13 survivors; they went on to live among the Canarian natives, until their deaths c. 1394. (Note: Viera Clavijo (1772), p. 276. First reported in manuscript of Pedro de Castillo. The dead Spaniards leave a document which was later given by a native Canarian to conqueror Gadifer de la Salle, as a "testament of Christian brothers, thirteen in number, whom they killed twelve years ago" (Le Canarien, ch.40). Probably confused with the 1386 Majorcan expedition of 'Pauperes Heremite'.)
5. An expedition in 1385 by Hernan Peraza, a Sevillan with a permit from Henry III of Castile, that raided Lanzarote (probable confusion with Almonaster raid of 1393).
6. A 1386 expedition of two ships, under the command of Fernando de Ormel, of Galician origin, but noble in Castile and naval officer of John I of Castile. While patrolling the Andalusian coast, was caught up in a storm and ended up emerging at La Gomera (possibly the same as the 1372 expedition of Castro).
7. A 1399 expedition of Gonzalo Peraza Martel, Lord of Almonastor that raided Lanzarote (probable confusion with Almonaster raid of 1393).

Other legendary traditions include the apparition of the Virgin of Candelaria in 1392–1393, encountered by two Guanche goatherds on the beaches of Tenerife.

== Conquest ==
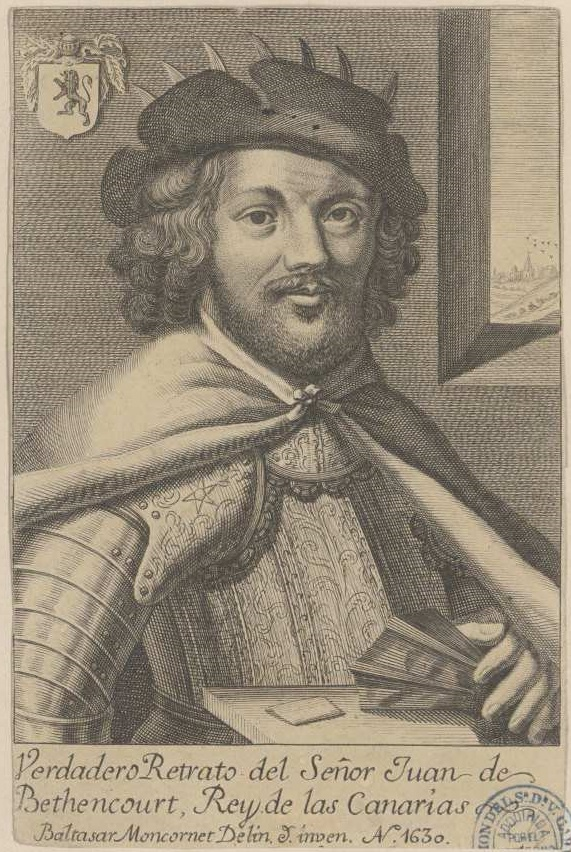
Jean de Béthencourt

The conquest took place between 1402 and 1496. It was not an easy task, militarily, given the resistance of the Guanche aboriginals in some islands. Nor was it easy politically, given the conflicting interests of the nobility (bent on fortifying their economic and political power) and the state, particularly Castile, with an interest in reinforcing its own power in competition with the nobles.

Historians identify three distinguishable periods in the conquest of the Canaries:

- Conquista señorial, so called because the conquest was carried out by the nobility for their own ends and without the direct participation of the Crown. Under a pact of vassalage the Crown granted the rights to the conquest and in exchange the noblemen swore allegiance to the Crown. We can distinguish within this period two phases. The first is known as the Conquista Betancuriana o Normanda (the Bethencourt or Norman Conquest) was carried out by Jean de Bethencourt and Gadifer de la Salle between 1402 and 1405 and involved the subjugation of Lanzarote, El Hierro and Fuerteventura.
- The second phase is known as the Conquista Señorial castellana and was carried out by Castilian nobles whose appropriation of the land was mediated through purchase, cession and marriage. This phase included the land conquered in the first phase and also the island of La Gomera and lasted until 1450. A prominent force in this phase was the Peraza family, which had managed to consolidate the Canary Islands under a single unified lordship and seigneury for the reigns of Hernán Peraza the Elder and his daughter Inés Peraza, though this did not hold.
- Conquista realenga. This term defines the conquest carried out directly by the Kingdom of Castile during the reign of the Catholic Monarchs who armed and part financed the conquest of the islands not yet subjugated: Gran Canaria, La Palma and Tenerife. This conquest ended in 1496 with the defeat of Tenerife and the integration of the Canaries Archipelago into the Kingdom of Castile. The Conquista realenga took place between 1478 and 1496.

== Norman conquest ==
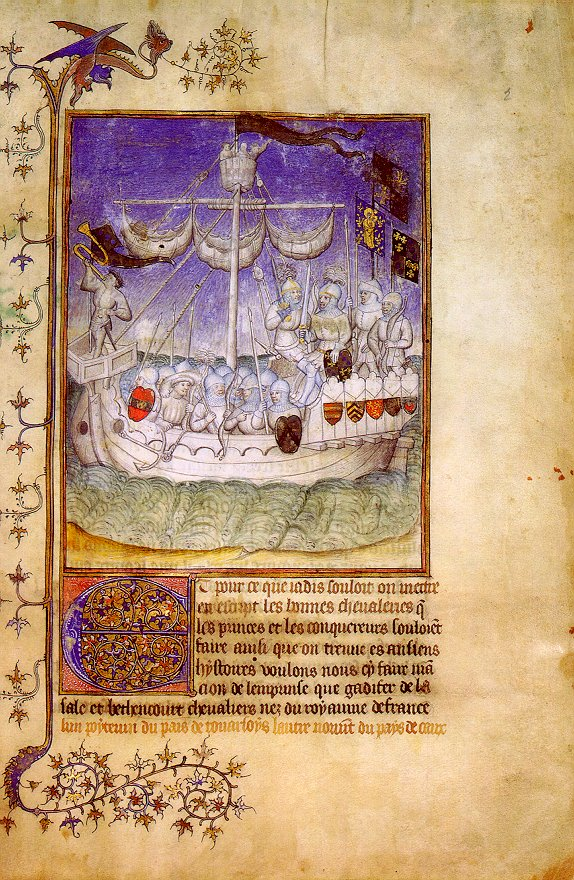
Illuminated page from Le Canarien (1490)

The first period (Spanish: Conquista Betancuriana o Normanda) of the conquest of the Canaries was carried out by the Norman nobles Jean de Bethencourt and Gadifer de la Salle. Their motives were basically economic: Bethencourt possessed textile factories and dye works and the Canaries offered a source of dyes such as the orchil lichen.

Bethencourt received important political support in the court of King Henry III of Castile. His uncle, Robert de Bracquemont, gained the king's permission for the conquest of the Canary Islands on behalf of the Norman noble. In exchange for these rights Bethencourt became a vassal of the Castilian King. Robert de Bracquemont invested a significant amount in the venture. The story of the Bethencourt Conquest was recorded in the chronicle known as the Canarian, compiled by two clerics Pierre Bontier and Jean Le Verrier. The original was adapted in two later versions, one by Gadifer de La Salle (which appears the more reliable of the two) and the other by the nephew of Bethencourt, Maciot de Bethencourt.

=== Conquest of Lanzarote ===
The Norman expedition set off from La Rochelle and stopped off in Galicia and Cádiz before arriving in Lanzarote in the summer of 1402. The island's aborigines and their chief Guadarfia were unable to resist the invading forces and surrendered. The Normans established themselves on the south of the island where they constructed a fortress and founded the Bishopric of Rubicon. From this location they attempted an assault on Fuerteventura.

=== Conquest of Fuerteventura ===
This campaign lasted between 1402 and 1405. The extended duration was not due so much to the resistance of the islanders as to the difficulties and internal divisions between the two captains leading the invaders. Hunger and a lack of resources forced the expedition to retreat to Lanzarote. Jean de Bethencourt then travelled to Castile to drum up further support. There King Enrique III supplied the necessary measures and the confirmation of Bethencourt's exclusive rights to conquer the island, thereby marginalising Gadifer.

During Bethencourt's absence Gadifer had to confront a double rebellion, one by a section of his men led by Bertín de Berneval, who had restarted the capture of slaves, and the other by the Lanzarote Guanches who resisted this practice. Pacifying the island took until 1404 and the conquest of Fuerteventura recommenced at the end of that year. However, the two commanders acted separately, each one fortifying his own domain (the castles of Rico Roque and Valtarajal). The conquest of the island was completed in 1405 with the surrender of the native kings of the island. On an unknown date Gadifer abandoned the island and returned to France to defend his rights, but he would never return to the islands.

After the victory Bethencourt, absolute owner of the islands, returned to Normandy in search of settlers and new resources in order to continue the conquest of the rest of the islands.

=== Conquest of El Hierro ===
The conquest of El Hierro took place in 1405. There was no resistance offered by the scattered Guanche population who were largely sold as slaves. The island was then repopulated with Norman and Castilian settlers.

Bethencourt remained on the islands until 1412 when he returned permanently to his lands in Normandy, leaving Maciot de Bethencourt in charge of his possessions.

== Castilian seigneurial conquest ==
The second period (Spanish: Conquista Señoral Castellana) began when the Bethencourt era ended in 1418 when Maciot sold his holdings and the rights to subjugate the remaining islands to Enrique Pérez de Guzmán. From this point on the intervention of the King of Castile increased. Between 1418 and 1445 dominion over the islands changed hands on a number of occasions. Finally, control over the conquered islands and the right to further conquests fell to Hernán Peraza the Elder and his children Guillén Peraza and Inés Peraza. The death of Guillén Peraza in the attack on La Palma has been immortalized in a moving lament. After the death of her brother Inés and her husband Diego García de Herrera became the sole rulers of the islands until 1477 when they ceded La Gomera to their son Hernán Peraza the Younger and the rights to the conquest of La Palma, Gran Canaria and Tenerife to the King of Castile.

The island of La Gomera was not taken in battle but was incorporated into the Peraza-Herrera fiefdom through an agreement between Hernán Peraza the Elder and some of the insular aboriginal groups who accepted the rule of the Castilian. However, there were a number of uprisings by the Guanches due to outrages committed by the rulers on the native Gomeros. The last one, in 1488 caused the death of the islands ruler, Hernán Peraza The Younger, whose widow, Beatriz de Bobadilla y Ossorio, succeeded him in rule and sought the assistance of Pedro de Vera, conqueror of Gran Canaria, in order to snuff out the rebellion. The subsequent repression caused the death of two hundred rebels and many others were sold into slavery in the Spanish markets.

== Royal conquest ==
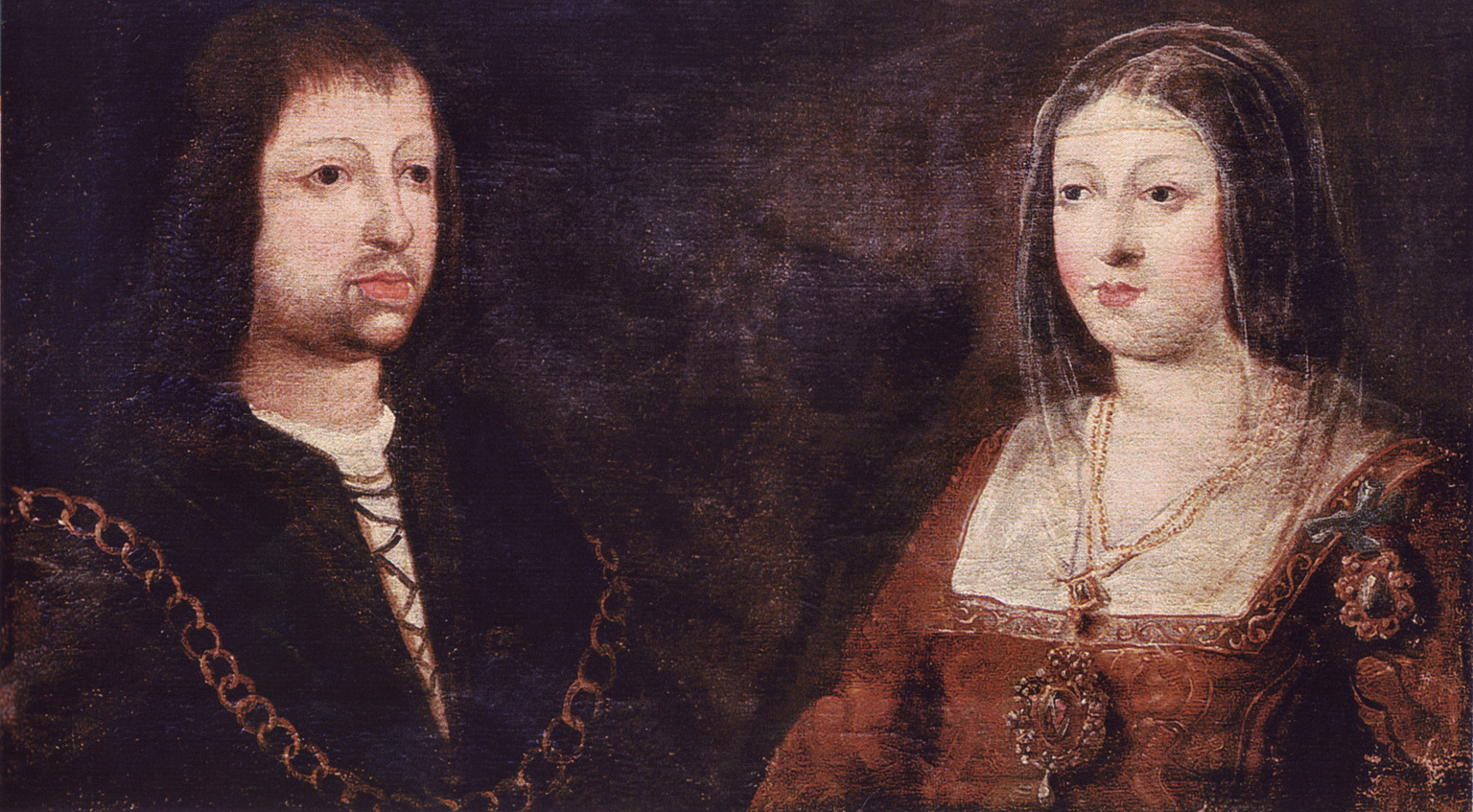
The Catholic Monarchs: Ferdinand and Isabel

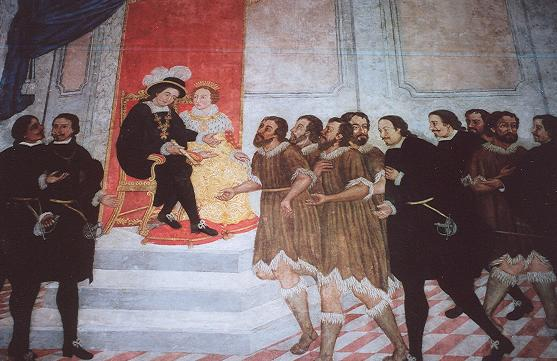
Alonso Fernández de Lugo presenting the captured Guanche kings of Tenerife to Ferdinand and Isabella

The third period (Spanish: Conquista Realenga) of the Spanish conquest of the Canaries was different from the first in a number of ways:

- The Catholic Monarchs commanded and armed the invading forces.
- The funding for the enterprise was the responsibility of the Crown and individuals interested in the economic exploitation of the island's resources.
- The islands involved, Gran Canaria, La Palma and Tenerife, had larger populations and offered the best economic rewards.
- The Guanches of the three islands, but particularly those of Gran Canaria and Tenerife, offered a clear and prolonged resistance to the conquest.

=== Conquest of Gran Canaria (1478–1483) ===
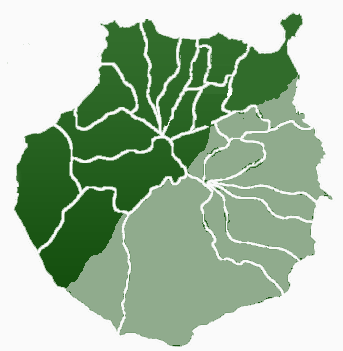
The division of Gran Canaria at the time of the conquest (Guanartemato de Gáldar – dark green, Guanartemato de Telde – light green)

There were three stages in the conquest of Gran Canaria:

a) Initial stage, June – December 1478. The first expeditionary force disembarked on La Isleta on 24 June 1478. The force was commanded by Juan Rejón and Dean Bermúdez, as representative of the Bishop of San Marcial del Rubicón, Juan de Frías, who was a co-financier of the expedition. They founded Real de La Palmas near to Barranco de Guiniguada on the site of the present day Las Palmas de Gran Canaria. A few days later the first battle of the campaign took place near to Real when the islanders were defeated. This initial victory gave the Castilians control of the northeast corner of the island.

b) Guanche resistance and Castilian divisions from the close of 1478 until 1481. This period is defined by aboriginal resistance in the mountainous interior, the lack of men and materials and internal disputes between the invaders. During this stage Juan Rejón was dismissed on the orders of the Catholic Monarchs. His place was taken by Pedro Fernández de Algaba who was subsequently executed by order of the deposed Rejón. The naming of Pedro de Vera as the new governor of the island and the arrest of Juan Rejón put an end to the in-fighting that had continued until 1481.

c) Suppression of the Guanche resistance and conquest of the island, 1481–83. Pedro de Vera, now undisputed commander of the Castilian forces, resumed the conquest of the island's interior and the Guanche fiefdom of Gáldar. He was able to do this because a large contingent of reinforcements had been sent from Gomero by Diego García de Herrera. The Guanche leader Doramas was subsequently killed in the Battle of Arucas. The capture of Tenesor Semidán, king of Gáldar, by Alonso Fernández de Lugo was a decisive factor in the victory of the invaders. Tenesor Semidán was sent to Castile where he was baptized with the name Fernando Guanarteme and after signing the Calatayud Pact with Fernando the Catholic he became a loyal and valuable ally of the Castilians. His actions have been interpreted in a number of ways throughout history: some think he was a traitor to the aboriginal cause; while others feel he was an able negotiator who saved many lives. On 29 April 1483 Guayarmina Semidán, considered to be queen of Gran Canaria, surrendered at Ansite Fortress. On the same day Chief Bentejuí and his shaman-advisor Faycán committed suicide by jumping off a cliff while shouting Atis Tirma (for my land).

The role of the indigenous woman Francisca de Gazmira is considered key to the pacification and evangelisation of the island after the conquest, and the defence of indigenous rights.

=== Conquest of La Palma (1492–93) ===
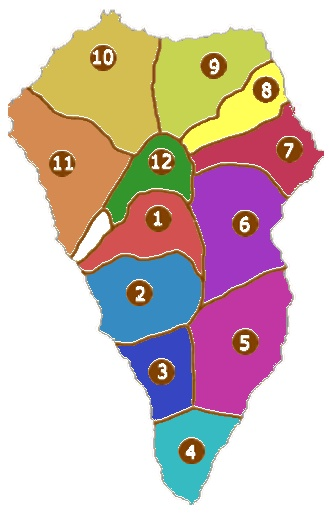
The division of La Palma at the time of the conquest

Alonso Fernández de Lugo, who played an important role in the conquest of Gran Canaria was granted the rights of conquest for La Palma and Tenerife by the Catholic Monarchs. The agreement with the Crown included a fifth of the captives and 700,000 maravedís if the conquest was completed within a year.

In order to finance the enterprise Alonso Fernández de Lugo entered into association with Juanoto Berardi and Francisco de Riberol. Each partner contributed a third of the costs and would receive the same proportion of the benefits.

The campaign was relatively easy, commencing on 29 September 1492 when the Castilians landed in Tazacorte. Alonso Fernández de Lugo made use of agreements and pacts with the Guanches which respected the rights of the chieftains giving full equality with the Castilians in order to attract them to his cause. Resistance was generally minimal, with the exception of an incident in Tigalate. However, there was more concerted resistance in the canton of Aceró (Caldera de Taburiente) where the chief, Tanausú, was easily able to hold out as the only two access points to the area were readily defendable against the advance of the invading forces.

Seeing that the year would soon be up and fearing that he would lose the bonus of 700,000 maravedíes Fernández de Lugo proposed a meeting with Tanausú which was to take place in Los Llanos de Aridane. The Castilians ambushed and captured Tanausú when he left the Caldera. He was then sent to Castile as a prisoner; however, he starved to death on the journey. The official date for the end of the conquest is given as 3 May 1493. Following this part of the population of Aceró and other cantons which had signed peace treaties were sold as slaves although the majority were integrated into the new society formed after the conquest.

=== Conquest of Tenerife (1494–96) ===
The division of Tenerife at the time of the conquest

Tenerife was the last island to be conquered and the one that took the longest time to submit to the Castilian troops. Although the traditional dates of conquest of Tenerife are established between 1494 (landing of Alonso Fernández de Lugo) and 1496 (conquest of the island), it must be taken into account that the attempts to annex the island of Tenerife to the Crown of Castile date back at least to 1464. For this reason, 32 years passed between the first attempt in 1464, until the island's final conquest in 1496.

In 1464, takes place in the barranco del Bufadero taking symbolic possession of the island by the Lord of the Canary Islas Diego Garcia de Herrera. This signing a peace treaty with menceyes, allowing shortly after mencey Anaga build a tower on their land, where Guanches and Europeans had treatment until it is demolished around 1472 by the same Guanches.

In 1492 the governor of Gran Canaria Francisco Maldonado organized a raid ending in disaster for Europe, as they are defeated by the Guanches of Anaga.

In December 1493 Alonso Fernández de Lugo obtained the Catholic Monarchs confirmation of his right of conquest over the island of Tenerife and in exchange for renouncing the bonus promised for the conquest of La Palma he claimed governorship of the island, although he would not receive revenue from the quinto real tax.

The finance for the conquest was achieved by the sale of his sugar plantations in the valley of Agaete, obtained after the conquest of Gran Canaria, and by forming an association with Italian merchants who had settled in Seville.

At the time of the conquest Tenerife was divided into nine Menceyatos or kingdoms which can be divided into two camps, one largely in favour of the Castilians and the other opposed to them. The former which became known in Spanish as "el bando de paz", comprised the peoples of the south and east of the island (from the "menceyatos" of Anaga, Güímar, Abone and Adeje) who had previous contact with Castilians through the activities of the missionary Candelaria. The opposing "bando de guerra" was based in the "menceyatos" of the north: Tegueste, Tacoronte, Taoro, Icoden and Daute and maintained a fierce resistance to the invasion.

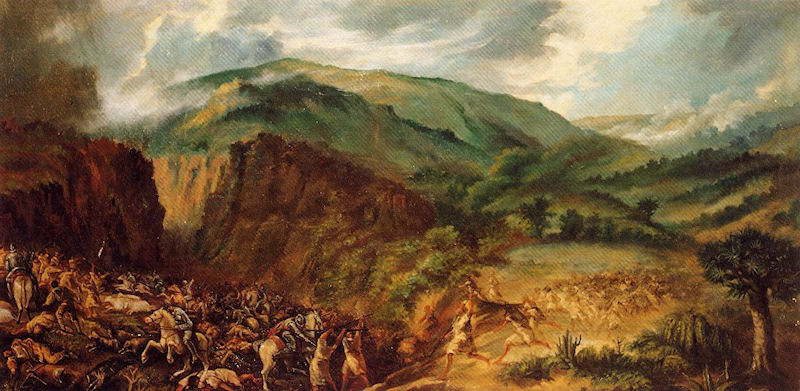
La matanza de Acentejo (The massacre of Acentejo) painted by Gumersindo Robayna, depicting the First Battle of Acentejo, Tenerife

The invading force set sail from Gran Canaria in April 1494 and landed on the coast of present-day Santa Cruz de Tenerife. The force comprised 2,000-foot soldiers and 200 cavalry made up of peninsular Castilians as well as soldiers from the other Canary Islands (mainly from Gomera and Gran Canary). After building a fortress they advanced towards the interior of the island. They tried to negotiate with Bencomo, the most important king in the "bando de guerra", and offered peace if he accepted Christianity and submitted to the authority of the Catholic Monarchs. Bencomo rejected the conditions attached to the offer making confrontation inevitable.

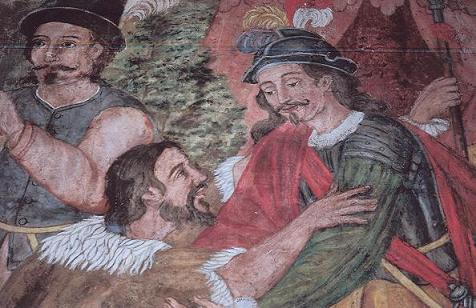
The native kings of Tenerife surrender to Alonso Fernández de Lugo, 25 July 1496

The first armed encounter between the two sides was the celebrated First Battle of Acentejo that took place in a ravine called the Barranco de Acentejo or Barranco de San Antonio in the present day municipality of La Matanza de Acentejo. A force of more than 2,000 men advanced towards the north of the island through the valley of Taoro. The objective was to defeat the Guanches in the centre of their heartland. The Guanches ambushed the invaders who suffered a grave defeat, losing eighty percent of their forces in the battle. After the battle the Guanches destroyed the fortress built by the Castilians.

Alonso Fernández de Lugo requested and received extensive further aid and supplies from neighboring territorial lord Inés Peraza totalling 600,000 maravedí and returned to Tenerife with a better trained and armed force. After rebuilding the fortress at Añazo he advanced towards the plains of Aguere (San Cristóbal de La Laguna) where in November he defeated Bencomo in the Battle of Aguere as the gaunche leader committed the error of engaging the Castilian forces in battle in open ground. The use of cavalry and reinforcements provided by Fernando Guanarteme were the deciding factors in the Castilian victory. The Guanches lost 1,700 men including Bencomo and his brother (or possibly stepbrother) Tinguaro. It is claimed that an epidemic had infected the population before the battle, decimating the island's population and leaving the survivors weak or ill, this is known as the "gran modorra" or the great drowsiness. However, the exact size of the epidemic and its importance in the outcome of the battle remains disputed by some historians.

In December 1495, after a long period of guerrilla warfare, pillaging and war fatigue the Castilians again advanced on the interior in the direction of Taoro, this time from the north. A force of several thousand Guanches awaited them in a ravine near to the present day municipality of La Victoria de Acentejo, not far from the site of the First Battle of Acentejo. The Castilian victory in the Second Battle of Acentejo brought about the collapse of aboriginal resistance and access to the Taoro Valley remained open. The battle marked the conquest of the island of Tenerife and the end of the conquest of the Canary Islands.

It was in the Orotava Valley the conquest of Tenerife ended on July 25, 1496, with the Treaty of Los Realejos between the Taoro mencey and Alonso Fernández de Lugo. It was in honor of the cessation of hostilities that the first Christian church, Parroquia Matriz del Apóstol Santiago, in honor of the patron saint of Spain, was built.

== Survival of the indigenous population ==
Despite the intensity of the colonisation and the relatively low native population of the archipelago, the conquest ended abruptly with no further wars or major losses due to epidemics and violence, and a significant part of modern Canarians descend from the Guanches.

== Academic analysis ==
Some historians have labelled the conquest genocidal in nature due to the brutal treatment of the Islands' indigenous Guanches which contributed to their extinction as a distinct group.

Historian Francisco Morales Padrón wrote in 1978 that the conquest of the islands constituted a genocide. Historian Daniele Conversi locates the conquest of the Canary Islands within the history of colonial and imperial genocides. Genocide scholar Mark Levene has stated that while there was not the intent by the Castilian crown to commit genocide, the result of their conquest was the same as if they had intended to commit genocide. Historian and specialist in genocide studies Mohamed Adhikari published an article in 2017 analysing the settler colonial history of the Canary Islands as a case of genocide, saying that the Canary Islands were the scene of "Europe's first overseas settler colonial genocide," and that the mass killing and enslavement of natives, along with forced deportation, sexual violence and confiscation of land and children constituted an attempt to "destroy in whole" the Guanche people. The tactics used in the Canary Islands in the 15th century served as a model for the Iberian colonisation of the Americas.

== See also ==
- Kingdom of the Canary Islands
- Battle of Aguere
- First Battle of Acentejo
- Second Battle of Acentejo
