= Hernan Peraza the Elder =

Spanish Conquistador

Hernán Peraza
- Born: Hernán Peraza Martel c. 1390; Sevilla
- Died: 1452 (62 years old); San Sebastián de La Gomera
- Other names: Fernán Peraza, The Elder (El Viejo)
- Occupations: Conquistador, Mayor, Alderman, Territorial lord
- Title: Lord of the Canary Islands
- Term: 1445-1452
- Predecessor: Guillén de las Casas
- Successor: Inés Peraza de las Casas
- Spouse: Inés de las Casas
- Children: Guillén Peraza and Inés Peraza
- Parent(s): Gonzalo Pérez Martel and Leonor Ruiz de Peraza
- Family: Peraza family

Hernán (or Fernán) Peraza Martel also known as Hernán/Fernán Peraza the Elder (El Viejo), (Seville, c. 1390 – San Sebastián de La Gomera, 1452) was a Castilian nobleman and Conquistador, and the territorial lord of the Lordship of the Canary Islands in the fifteenth century.

He was the founder of the towns of San Sebastián de La Gomera and Valverde.

== Biography ==
=== Early life ===
Likely born in Seville at the end of the fourteenth century, he was the second son of Gonzalo Pérez Martel, VI Lord of Almonaster, jury of the coalition of El Salvador, Major Collector of Seville and Procurator in the Court of Madrid in 1391. His Mother was Leonor Ruiz Peraza, daughter of Bartolomé Ruiz Peraza, a Sevillian knight. His siblings were Alonso Pérez Martel, first-born and VII Lord of Almonaster, and Leonor Martel, wife of Fernán Arias de Saavedra, the renown Lord of Castelar and warden of Cañete la Real.

By 1410 Peraza was engaged in the trade of olive oil from his olive groves in Valdeflores, where he was lord. He was also warden of the Castle of Matrera in 1420, Faithful Executor and a Knight veintiquatro of Seville.

During the 1430s he would act in the Canary Islands on behalf of Guillén de las Casas and his father-in-law Juan, who owned the rights to them.

=== Unification of the Lordship of the Canary Islands ===
Through his father, Gonzalo Martel, Hernán Peraza owned certain rights over the lordship of the islands, thanks to the grant by King Enrique III of Castile to Gonzalo in 1391 to conquer them.

From his marriage to Inés de las Casas, Peraza received the dominion of the island of Fuerteventura, granted as a dowry by his father-in-law Juan de las Casas, while he obtained the right to the rest of the islands in 1445 when he traded with Guillén de las Casas, a relative of his wife, his estate in Huévar in exchange for the rights that Guillén had over the lordship of the islands, both inherited from his father Alfonso - Tenerife, La Gomera, La Palma and Gran Canaria - and acquired from the Count of Niebla Enrique de Guzmán in 1430 — El Hierro and Lanzarote. This effectively unified control of most of the Canary Islands under Peraza.

=== Establishment on the islands ===
Peraza relocated to the islands in 1447 with his son Guillén and three ships, first taking possession of Fuerteventura, where they were well received.

While Peraza organized the new government of Fuerteventura, he also organized several expeditions to the other islands in search of slaves and loot with which to pay for the conquest. A ship led by a relative and in which his son Guillén goes, makes an incursion in La Palma, where the natives defeat the conquerors and Guillén dies, while the other two ships, under the command of Biscayan captain Juan Machín, arrive to El Hierro and capture the daughter of the island king.

The death of Guillén Peraza becomes a highly significant and impactful moment in the history of the Canary Islands politically and culturally. It sparks sadness and outrage among nobles in the Castilian mainland and drove his father Hernán to an increasingly brutal repression of the native people. It also inspired the first work of original Spanish literature to come from the Canary Islands, a dirge poem titled Endechas a la muerte de Guillén Peraza - Laments to the death of Guillén Peraza. His exact date of death was not recorded, however it can be dated between the second half of 1447 and the first quarter of 1448. His body was believed to be found during an excavation in 1980.

Returning his army to Fuerteventura, Hernán Peraza embarked to take possession of his domain. They arrived in Gran Canaria, but they do not get to disembark due to a large number of hostile aborigines concentrated on the beaches of the bay of the Islets.

=== Reconquest of El Hierro ===
Although the island of El Hierro had been conquered by Jean de Bethencourt in 1404 or 1405, the instability of the dominion of the Canary Islands during the first half of the fifteenth century caused its relative abandonment by the conquistadors and the aboriginal Bimbaches to return to their native customs. Therefore, already in possession of the lordship, Peraza arrived on the island with his army in November 1448 with the intention of dominating it. With the intercession of the island princess captivated by Juan Machín, Peraza achieved the submission of the aboriginal king Osinisa.

Once the island was dominated, Peraza founded the town of Valverde and left his relative Luis González Martel de Tapia as governor, who married a daughter of the deposed Bimbache king.

=== Occupation of La Gomera and conflicts with the Portuguese ===
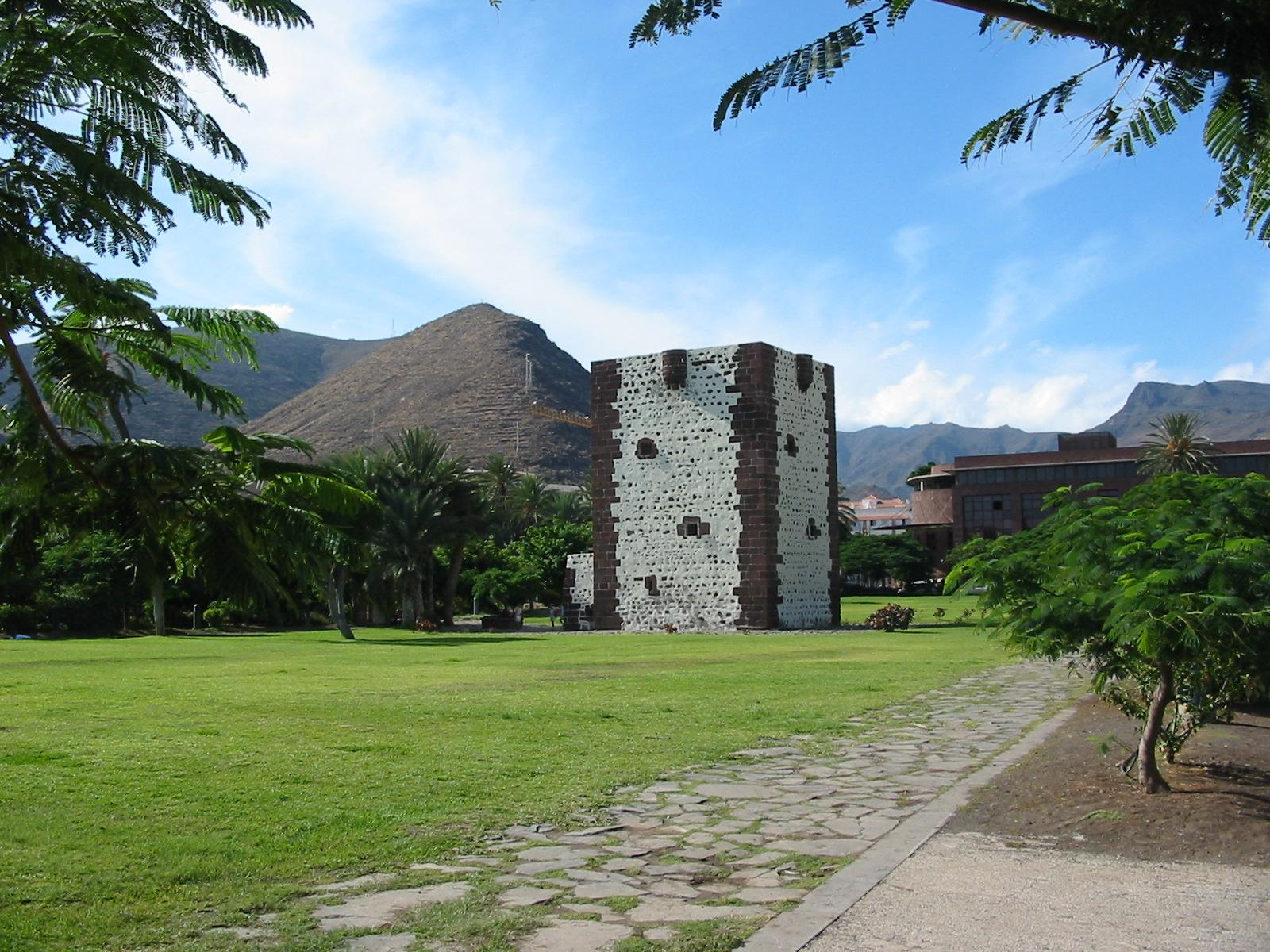
"Torre del Conde," the tower constructed by Hernán Peraza The Elder in 1450.

In January 1450 Peraza reached the edge of gomero de Orone, where he receives the submission of the native king. As a consequence of this peace, the sides of Hermigua or Mulagua and Agana, aligned to the Portuguese since 1423, rebelled against Peraza. For this reason, Peraza chooses to build a tower on the side of Ipalan where the best port on the island was located, building what is now known as La Torre del Conde - "The Tower of the Count."

Peraza faced several attacks by the Portuguese in 1450 and in 1452.

=== Entry into Tenerife ===
After dominating La Gomera, Peraza continued to make inroads into the islands without conquering. In an entry he made to Tenerife, he captured a Guanche boy who was fishing on the shore. Peraza took him as a servant, baptizing him with the name of Antón and who, years later, would return to the island and would be the one to instruct the Guanche people on the image of the Virgin of Candelaria.

== Personal life ==
Peraza was married to Inés de las Casas, daughter of Juan de las Casas, by 1424. The Count of Niebla had transferred ownership of the islands to him through her.

Their son, Guillén Peraza, died in battle on La Palma. Therefore, the right of conquest of the Canary Islands passed to their daughter, Inés Peraza.

Hernán Peraza died in San Sebastián de La Gomera in 1452.

== See also ==
- Peraza Family
- Conquest of the Canary Islands
- History of the Canary Islands
