= Beatriz de Bobadilla y Ossorio =

16th-century Spanish mistress of the Canary Islands

Beatriz de Bobadilla y Ulloa-Ossorio
- Born: 1462; Medina del Campo, Kingdom of Castile
- Died: 1504 (aged 41–42); Las Palmas de Gran Canaria
- Other names: Beatriz de Bobadilla y Ulloa, Beatriz de Bobadilla y Ossorio
- Occupations: Lady and Governor of La Gomera and El Hierro
- Spouse: Hernán Peraza the Younger
- Children: Guillén Peraza de Ayala and Inés de Herrera y Ayala

Beatriz de Bobadilla y Ulloa-Ossorio (1462 – 1504) was the daughter of Juan de Bobadilla and named after her cousin Beatriz de Bobadilla. Beatriz de Bobadilla y Ossorio was married to the ruler of the La Gomera and El Hierro islands, Lord Hernán Peraza the Younger and after his death she succeeded him as ruler.

== Background ==
Beatriz was born in Medina del Campo to the powerful and wealthy Bobadilla family with close ties to the Crown of Castile. Her father, Juan de Bobadilla, held numerous roles including alderman for Medina del Campo, governor of Madrid, and chief huntsman for the Catholic Monarchs. As a result of this last role, Beatriz became known as "La Cazadora" – The Huntress. The name was also a reference to her attractiveness and her rumored high-profile relationships with King Fernando and Christopher Columbus. As a result of the former, Queen Isabella arranged for her to marry Hernán (also known as Fernán) Peraza, Lord of La Gomera and El Hierro, in 1482.

== Conquest of the Canary Islands ==
During the Spanish Conquest of the Canary Islands the island of La Gomera was not taken in battle but was incorporated into the Peraza-Herrera fiefdom through an agreement between Hernán Peraza the Elder and some of the insular aboriginal groups who accepted the rule of the Castilian. However, there were a number of uprisings by the Guanches aboriginals due to outrages committed by the rulers on the native Gomeros. The last of these, in 1488, resulted in the death of his son and Beatriz's husband, Hernán Peraza the Younger. Beatriz de Bobadilla y Ossorio then had to seek the assistance of Pedro de Vera, conqueror of Gran Canaria, in order to snuff out the rebellion. The subsequent repression caused the death of two hundred rebels and many others were sold into slavery in the Spanish markets. Beatriz then took her deceased husband's place as Lord of La Gomera and El Hierro, ruling for over ten years until their son, Guillén Peraza de Ayala, was old enough to rule himself.

== Columbus ==
Christopher Columbus made La Gomera his last port of call before crossing the Atlantic in 1492 with his three ships. He stopped here to replenish his crew's food and water supplies, intending to stay only four days. Beatriz de Bobadilla y Ossorio, the Countess of La Gomera and widow of Hernán Peraza the Younger, offered him vital support in preparations of the fleet and he ended up staying one month. When he finally sailed, she gave him cuttings of sugarcane, which became the first to reach the New World.

Columbus would visit her a further two times, in 1493 and 1498.

== Children ==
Beatriz de Bobadilla y Ossorio had two children, Guillén Peraza de Ayala and Inés de Herrera. Guillén succeeded her as ruler of the islands and was made a Count by Queen Juana of Castile/Emperor Carlos V.
