= Territorial lord =

Ruler who held sovereignty over a territory

A territorial lord (German: Landesherr) was a ruler in the period beginning with the Early Middle Ages who, stemming from his status as being immediate (unmittelbar), held a form of authority over a territory known as Landeshoheit. This authority gave him nearly all the attributes of sovereignty. Such a lord had authority or dominion in a state or territory, but this fell short of sovereignty since as a ruler of the Holy Roman Empire, he remained subject to imperial law and supreme authority, including imperial tribunals and imperial war contributions. The territorial lord was generally a member of the high aristocracy (Hochadel) or clergy, who was the title bearer or office holder of an existing or constituent state through the custom of primogeniture or feudal law.

In the Holy Roman Empire, the lords of the individual member states, the imperial states or Reichsstände (excluding the Holy Roman Emperor), were the territorial lords of the regions ruled by them. During the High Middle Ages, the system was further expanded as the lords began reclaiming territories and this was done by granting vassals jurisdiction over the acquired lands. It is also suggested that this development has led to the freedom of the peasants, since there were instances where they were granted freedom and, in practice, ownership of the land.

== Authority ==
The territorial lord usually had the rights of coinage and jurisdiction over his domain. A prerequisite for being a territorial lord was the combination of property and estate ownership, as well as sovereignty, in one person as a unified legal concept. The lords' economic domination, particularly in the Western European territories, can be demonstrated in the way ownership of the mill was vested in their hand. This ensured the dependence of the peasantry, since they were forced to grind their grains in their lord's mill.

An account cited that a uniquely good phenomenon that resulted from the emergence of the territorial lords was the way they manifested claim to dominion, which was responsible for the thriving forests in Europe today. Based on available forest history, these forests became a foundation of political power, and were thus not only subsumed within a territory but also protected rather than cleared. This was significant because it protected the great forests from the increasing appetite for wood of the emergent mining industry, particularly in Germany.
