= Bettencourt =

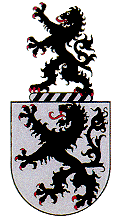
- Arms of the Bettencourt family.
- Current region: Azores, Brazil, Canary Islands, France, Madeira, Uruguay
- Earlier spellings: Béthencourt
- Etymology: Toponymic name meaning Betten's Estate
- Origin: Normandy
- Estates: Bettencourt Palace; Madre de Deus Manor

The Bettencourt family (French pronunciation: [betɒ̃kuʁ]) is a French noble family of Norman origin. The head of the family in the 14th century, Jean de Béthencourt, organized an expedition to conquer the Canary Islands, resulting in his being made King of the Canary Islands by Pope Innocent VII. Though the royal title would be short-lived, it allowed the family to firmly establish itself afterwards in the Azores and Madeira islands. The family is one of the most expansive and established families of the Portuguese nobility, as well as the Spanish nobility.

Through the expansion of the Portuguese Empire and Spanish Crown, the family and name spread across the world, mainly throughout Iberian America (Portuguese America and Spanish America), as well as Portuguese Africa.

== Variants of the name ==
Though the spelling Bettencourt is the most widely used and standardized spelling of the family, both in Portuguese and French, other spellings of the name have arisen. Some of these spellings include: Bethancourt/Betancourt, Bettencourt, Béthencourt, Bentancour, Bentancourt, Betancoor, Betancur, Betancurt, Betancurth, Betancor, Betencur, Bethancourt, Bittencourt, Bitencourt and DeBettencourt.

== Family history ==
Communes of France ending with -court

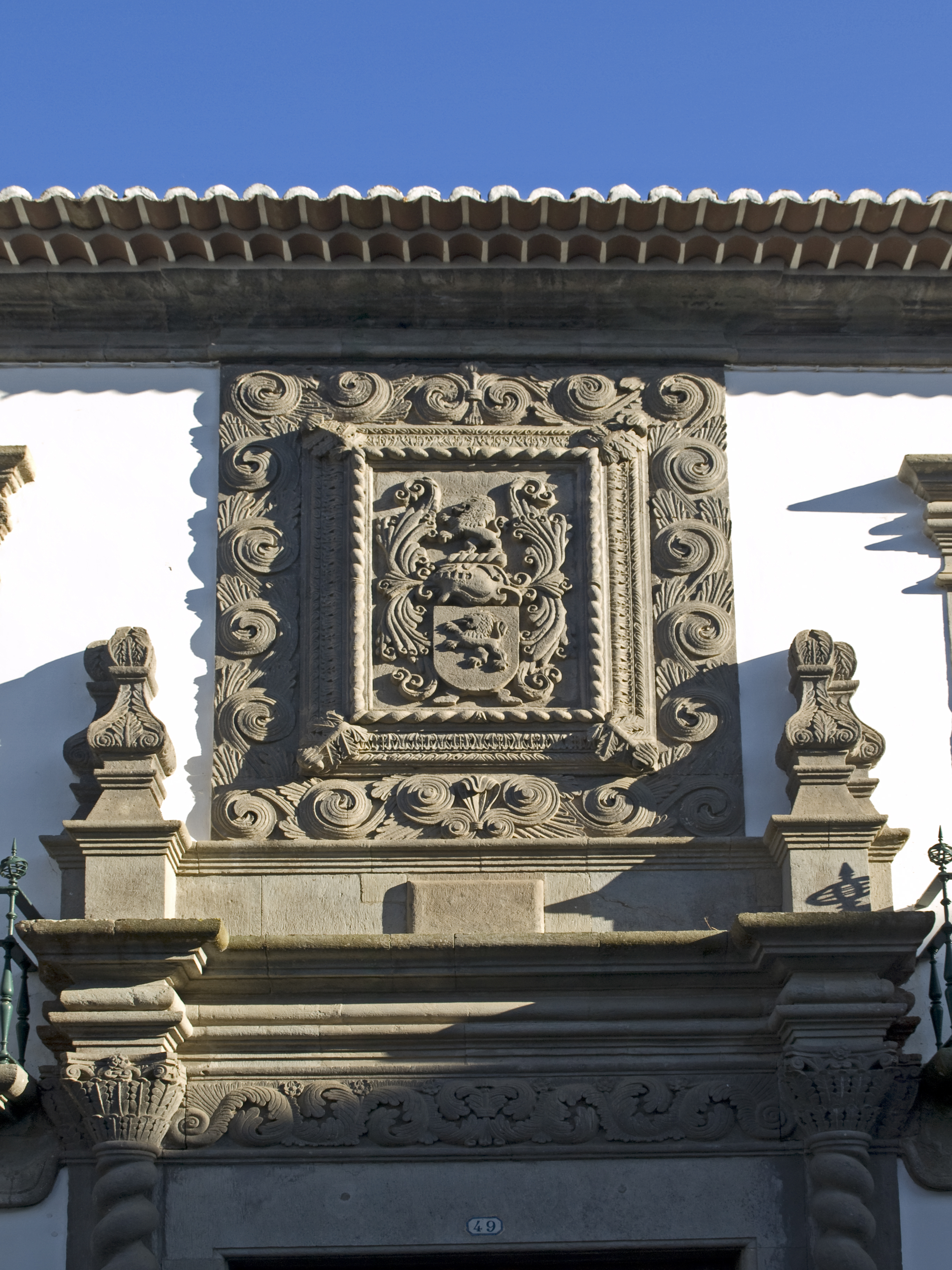
Coat of arms above the main entrance of Bettencourt Palace, Angra do Heroísmo

Bettencourt and Betancourt are originally place-names in Northern France. The place-name element -court ("courtyard, courtyard of a farm, farm") is typical of the French provinces, where the Frankish settlements formed an important part of the local population. It is a Gallo-Roman calque from the Old Low Franconian word *hof, meaning "courtyard", "courtyard of a farm", "farm" (Dutch, Old English hof, German Hof "courtyard", "farm").

The first part Betten- is the Germanic personal name (owner's name) Betto.

Bettencourt and Béthencourt correspond with Bettenhoffen, Bettenhof or Bettenhoven found in Alsace, Germany or Flanders cf. the Belgian town of Bettincourt called in Dutch Bettenhoven.

The surname Bettencourt/Béthencourt with various spellings extended throughout Spain, Portugal and their colonies, after the Norman-French explorer Jean de Béthencourt, who conquered the Canary Islands for Spain and received the title King of the Canary Islands.

To this day, Betancourt and other forms of this surname are quite frequent among Canary Islanders and people of Canary Islander descent, thanks to the offspring of Béthencourt's nephews who followed him in his conquest, especially Maciot de Bethencourt who acted as King of the Canary Islands after his uncle had returned to France.

Examples include former Cuban president Salvador Cisneros Betancourt, who also was Marquess of Santa Lucía, former Colombian president Belisario Betancur, former Venezuelan president Rómulo Betancourt, and Hermano Pedro de San José de Betancurt, a saint of the Catholic Church. Other modern notables are Venezuelan baseball player Rafael Betancourt, Azorean (Portuguese)-born American musician Nuno Bettencourt, Colombian-French activist/politician Ingrid Betancourt and Uruguayan activist Walner Ademir Bentancour Garin, disappeared by the Uruguayan and Argentinian military juntas in 1976.

== People with the surname ==
=== Bettencourt ===
- André Bettencourt (1919–2007) – French politician, served as Foreign Minister under President Georges Pompidou
- D.J. Bettencourt (born 1984) – American politician
- António Maria de Bettencourt Rodrigues (1854–1933) - Portuguese Doctor, Diplomat, Politician and Foreign Minister under President Oscar Carmona
- Diogo de Barcelos Machado Bettencourt (1847–1922) – Portuguese magistrate and politician
- João de Bettencourt de Vasconcelos (1589–1670) – Portuguese nobleman and governor
- Liliane Bettencourt (1922–2017) – French businesswoman, majority shareholder of L'Oréal, richest woman in history
- Nuno Bettencourt (born 1966) – Portuguese-born American musician
- Paul Bettencourt (born 1958) – American politician, currently Texas Senator from the 7th district
- Tiago Bettencourt (born 1979) – Portuguese singer-songwriter

=== Betancourt ===
- Agustín de Betancourt (1758–1825) – prominent Spanish structural engineer, educator, and urban planner
- Alfredo Betancourt (1914–2013) – Salvadoran writer
- Carlos Betancourt – American artist
- Carmelo Betancourt (born 1993) – Puerto Rican basketball player
- Christian Rogelio Benítez Betancourt (1986–2013) – Ecuadorian footballer
- Gabriel Betancourt (1918–2002) – Colombian politician and father of Íngrid Betancourt
- Gaspar Betancourt Cisneros (1803–1866) – Cuban writer
- Íngrid Betancourt (born 1961) – French-Colombian politician
- Jeanne Betancourt (born 1941) – American author
- John Gregory Betancourt (born 1963) – science fiction writer
- Kim Betancourt – American publisher
- Lázaro Aristides Betancourt (1936–2025) – Cuban hurdler
- Michael Betancourt – critical theorist, art and film historian, and animator
- Mick Betancourt (born 1974) – writer
- Nelson Betancourt (1887–1947) – West Indian cricketer
- Philip Betancourt – American Archaeologist
- Porfirio Armando Betancourt (1957–2021) – Honduran footballer
- Rafael Betancourt (born 1975) – Major League Baseball pitcher for the Colorado Rockies
- Rómulo Betancourt (1908–1981) – 47th and 54th President of Venezuela
- Sterling Betancourt (1930–2026) – Trinidadian musician

=== Bethancourt ===
See Bethancourt

=== Béthencourt ===
See Béthencourt

=== Bittencourt ===
See Bittencourt

=== Other variants ===
- Belisario Betancur (1923–2018) – Colombian conservative politician who served as the 26th President of Colombia
- Carmelo Bentancur (1899–?), Uruguayan soldier and fencer
- Diego Betancur Álvarez – Ambassador of Colombia to Australia
- Jorge Betancur (born 1991) – Nicaraguan footballer
- Peter of Saint Joseph Betancur (1626–1667), Spanish saint and missionary
- Rubén Bentancourt (born 1993) – Uruguayan footballer
- Rodrigo Bentancur (born 1997) – Uruguayan footballer

== See also ==
- Betancuria, municipality in the Canary Islands, Spain
- Bettencourt-Rivière, a French commune in the Somme department
- Bettencourt-Saint-Ouen, a French commune in the Somme department
- Béthencourt (disambiguation)
