= Angra do Heroísmo Museum =

Museum in the Azores, Portugal

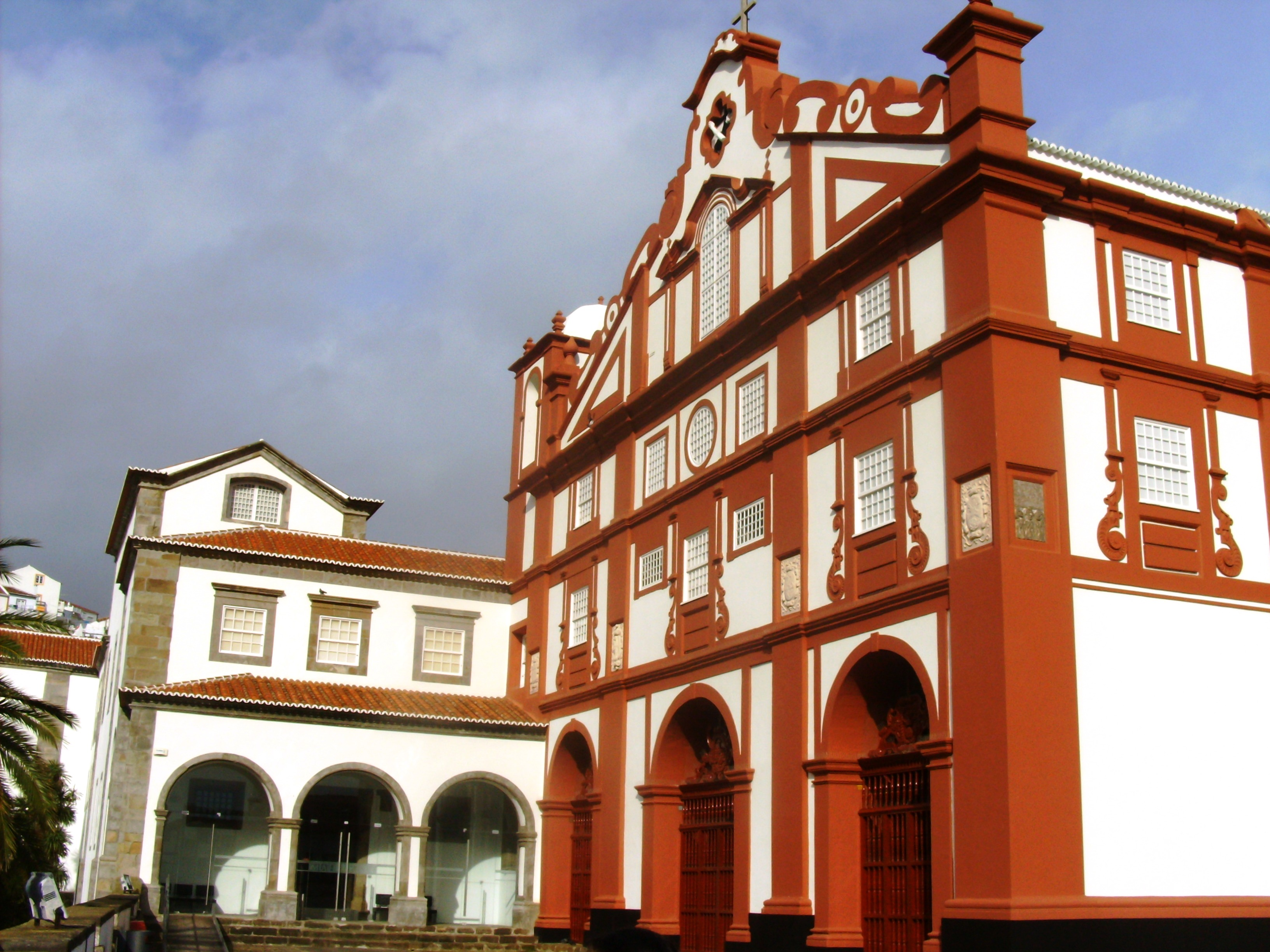
- Established: 30 March 1949
- Location: Ladeira de São Francisco, 9700-181 Angra do Heroísmo, Terceira, Azores, Portugal
- Coordinates: 38°39′25″N 27°13′01″W
- Website: https://museu-angra.cultura.azores.gov.pt/

The Angra do Heroísmo Museum is situated in the UNESCO World Heritage Site of Angra do Heroísmo on Terceira Island in the Azores archipelago, which is an autonomous region of Portugal. The museum covers the history and culture of Portugal in relation to that of the Azores and, specifically, Terceira Island and the city of Angra. In addition to its main location, in the former Convent of Saint Francis in Angra, there are also other smaller museums and sites in Terceira that fall under the Museum's remit.

== History ==
The museum was officially founded on 30 March 1949. Its first director was Manuel Coelho Baptista de Lima, who supervised its development over three decades. It was first based in Bettencourt Palace in Angra, sharing the building with the Angra District Archives between 1951 and 1969, before being transferred to its current location, the former Convent of Saint Francis, which has a church and cloister of significant architectural importance. It was run by the Autonomous District of Angra do Heroísmo until that became part of the Government of the Azores in 1976. The building was seriously damaged by the earthquake of 1 January 1980. While, some rooms on the lower floor remained open to the public significant repair work did not begin until 1991. Inauguration of the restored museum took place in November 1997, but it was not fully reopened until September 2000 when the permanent exhibition was completed. The church of the former convent, particularly noted for its organ, is now an integral part of the museum.

The museum added an additional site in 2016, with the opening of the Manuel Coelho Baptista de Lima Military History Unit, in the former Boa Nova Military Hospital in Angra. On 9 October 2020, the Carmina Contemporary Art Gallery, situated to the east of Angra, was donated to the museum by its founder, Dimas Simas Lopes.

== The collection ==
The main collection is housed on the entire upper floor of the main building. Called Do Mar e da Terra: uma história no Atlântico (Of Sea and Land: A History of the Atlantic), the exhibition explores the role of Terceira and the Azores in Portuguese history, from the settlement of the islands during the Age of Discovery to the present day, placing great emphasis on the strategic position of the Azores as the crossroads of the Atlantic.

The upper floor is divided into four sections. Section 1 looks at the discovery of the islands of the Azores from 1427, the beginnings of settlement in 1439, and the development of agriculture based on cereal cultivation and livestock rearing. It considers how the location of the Azores made the islands indispensable for navigation as Portuguese explorers began to head further afield. This is explored further in Section 2, which looks at the role of Angra do Heroísmo in the 16th century as a base for travel and trade between Portugal and its colonial outposts. Its importance opened it up to threats from other countries, leading to the Spanish Conquest of the Azores in 1583, with Spanish rule lasting until the Portuguese Restoration War (1640–1668). Section 3 looks at the establishment of the Captaincy General of the Azores in 1766, with its headquarters in Angra, and Terceira's role in the Liberal Wars between 1828 and 1834. These were followed by considerable emigration to Terceira, which led to clashes with the local population. Section 4 covers the 19th and 20th centuries, including the increased use of modern inventions, steps taken to improve the defences of the island, and Terceira's role in World War II, notably through the granting of access to Lajes Field airbase to the Allies.

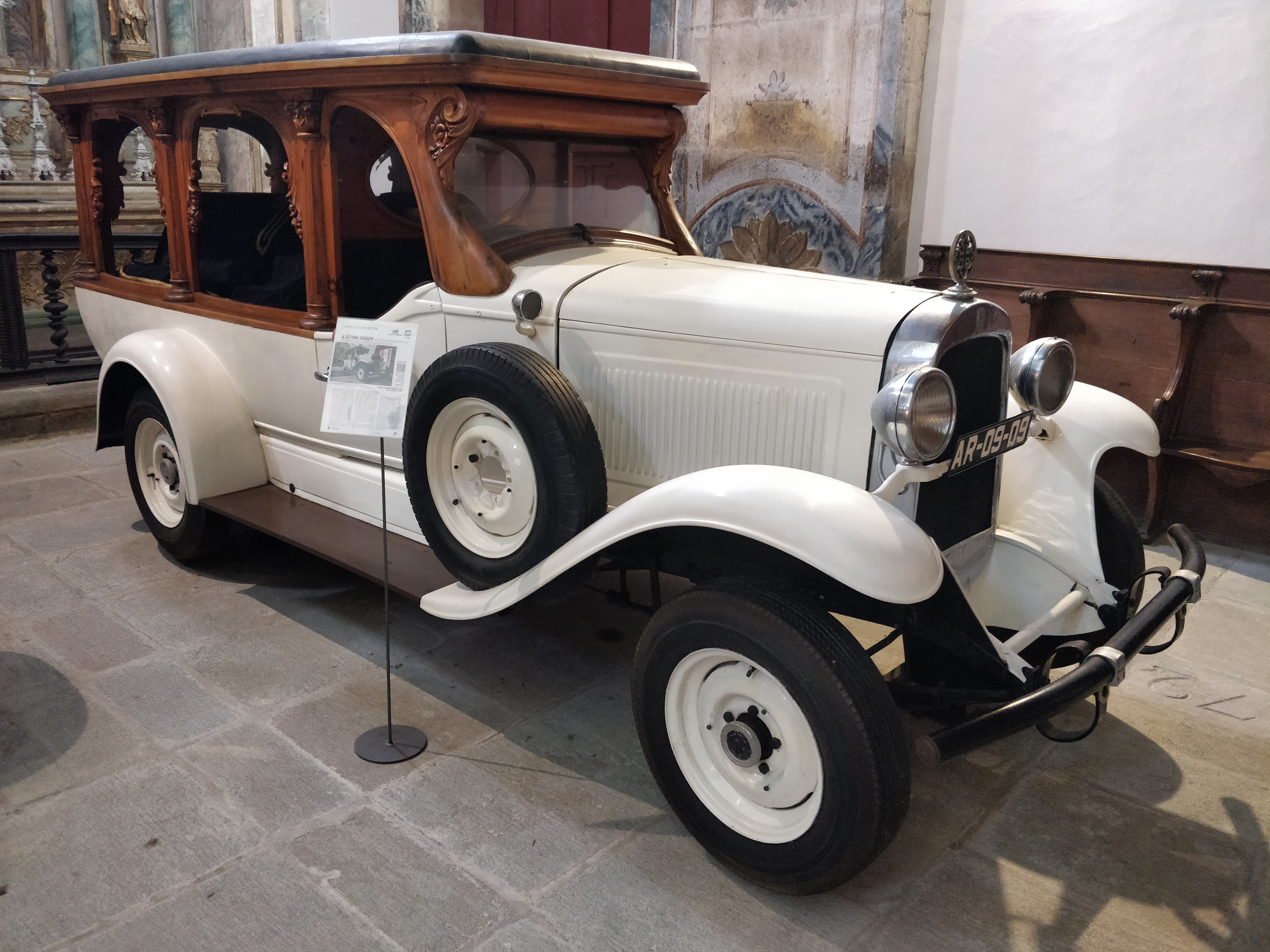
Tereceira's first motorised hearse

There are two other exhibition spaces for temporary exhibitions, along with visitable collections on artwork in stone, including tombstones, coats of arms, a wide variety of architectural elements from old civil and religious buildings and equipment used in domestic and farm activities. The museum describes itself as a "museum of synthesis". Its most notable feature is its eclectic nature, or diversity, covering ethnography, weaponry and military equipment, painting, imagery, ceramics, costumes, musical instruments, and furniture, as well as transport and the inevitable wars in the region. There are also medal and stamp displays and a collection of paintings by António Dacosta, an artist from Angra do Heroísmo.

The Frederico Vasconcelos Room examines the history of the Vasconcelos Family, which since the late 18th century has developed businesses in various areas of commerce and industry with relevance to the economy of the Azores. It provides a reminder of the history of the Industrial Revolution and the family's investments, which reflected the fortunes of the island's economy.

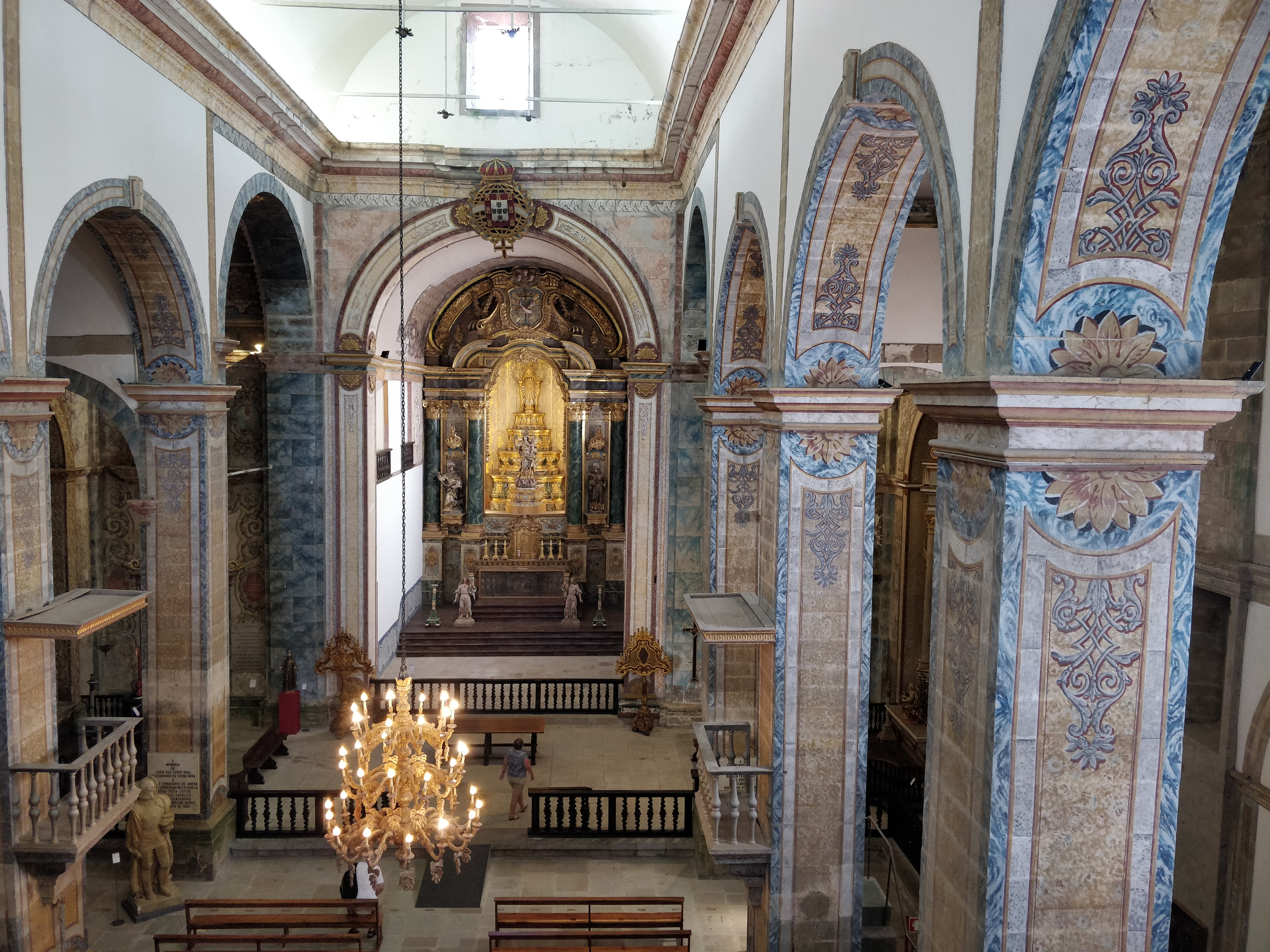
Interior of the church

== Church of Our Lady of the Guide ==
The church of the Convent of St. Francis is now an integral part of the museum. The Igreja de Nossa Senhora da Guia is in a Portuguese architectural style marked by austere forms. It stands close to the site of a small chapel built in the 15th century for the same patron saint by the sailor Afonso Gonçalves Baldaia, one of the first settlers on the island.

Built between 1666 and 1672, the current church has three naves. The sacristy, opened to the public in 2018 after restoration, is particularly known for a rosewood chest, attributed to Manoel de Almeyda. The choir loft was reserved for the Franciscan friars. The walls are covered in tile paneling from the first half of the 18th century, narrating episodes from the life of Saint Francis, attributed to Valentim de Almeida (1692–1779). The organ, the oldest existing pipe organ in the Azores, was made in 1788 by António Xavier Machado e Cerveira, one of Portugal's leading organ makers. The Dutch organist Gustaaf van Manen is the resident artist.

== See also ==
- Convent of São Francisco (Angra do Heroísmo)
