= Bittencourt =

Bittencourt is a surname, a spelling variant of Bettencourt. Notable people with the surname include:

- Amaro Soares Bittencourt (1885–1963), Brazilian general, diplomat, military and civil engineer
- Caroline Bittencourt (1981–2019), Brazilian model and TV presenter
- Danny Bittencourt Morais (born 1985), Brazilian football player
- Franklin Bittencourt (born 1969), Brazilian football player and coach
- Leonardo Bittencourt (born 1993), German football player
- Márcio Bittencourt (born 1964), Brazilian football player
- Rafael Bittencourt (born 1971), Brazilian guitarist, composer and co-founder of Angra
- Rafael de Andrade Bittencourt Pinheiro (born 1982), Brazilian football player
- Rodrigo Oliveira de Bittencourt (born 1983), Brazilian football player
- Maria Luísa Bittencourt, (1910–2001), Brazilian politician
- Simone Bittencourt de Oliveira (born 1949), Brazilian singer
- Maria Eduarda Matos Bittencourt (born 2012)

== See also ==
- Estádio Jair Bittencourt, multi-use stadium in Itaperuna, Brazil
- Rodovia Régis Bittencourt (SP-230), a section of the BR-116 road that connects São Paulo and Curitiba, Brazil
- Vila Bittencourt, a populated place in Amazonas, Brazil
