= Béthencourt (disambiguation) =

Béthencourt is a commune in department Nord, Nord-Pas-de-Calais, France.

Béthencourt may also refer to:

== France ==
- Béthencourt-sur-Mer, a French commune in department Somme, Picardie
- Béthencourt-sur-Somme, a French commune in department Somme, Picardie
- Béthencourt, a former parish brought under the commune of Dancourt, Seine-Maritime
- Béthencourt, a hamlet of the commune Tincques, department Pas-de-Calais, in Nord-Pas-de-Calais

== People with the surname ==
- Jean de Béthencourt (1362–1425), French explorer and conquistador
- Antoine de Béthencourt, French general of the French revolution, participated in the Battle of Mas Deu
- Jacques de Béthencourt (fl. early 16th century), French physician

== See also ==
- Bettencourt
