= Colégio Pedro II =

Public school in Rio de Janeiro, Brazil

Pedro II School
- Colégio Pedro II
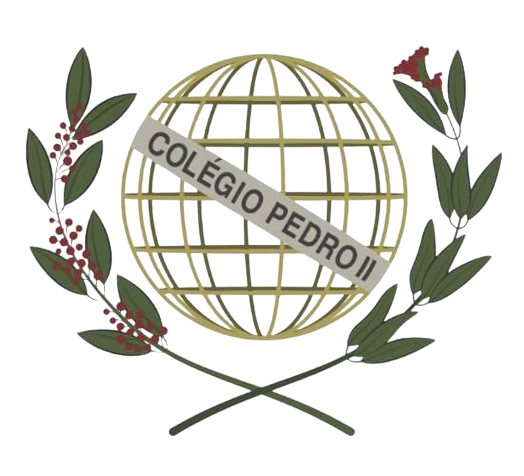

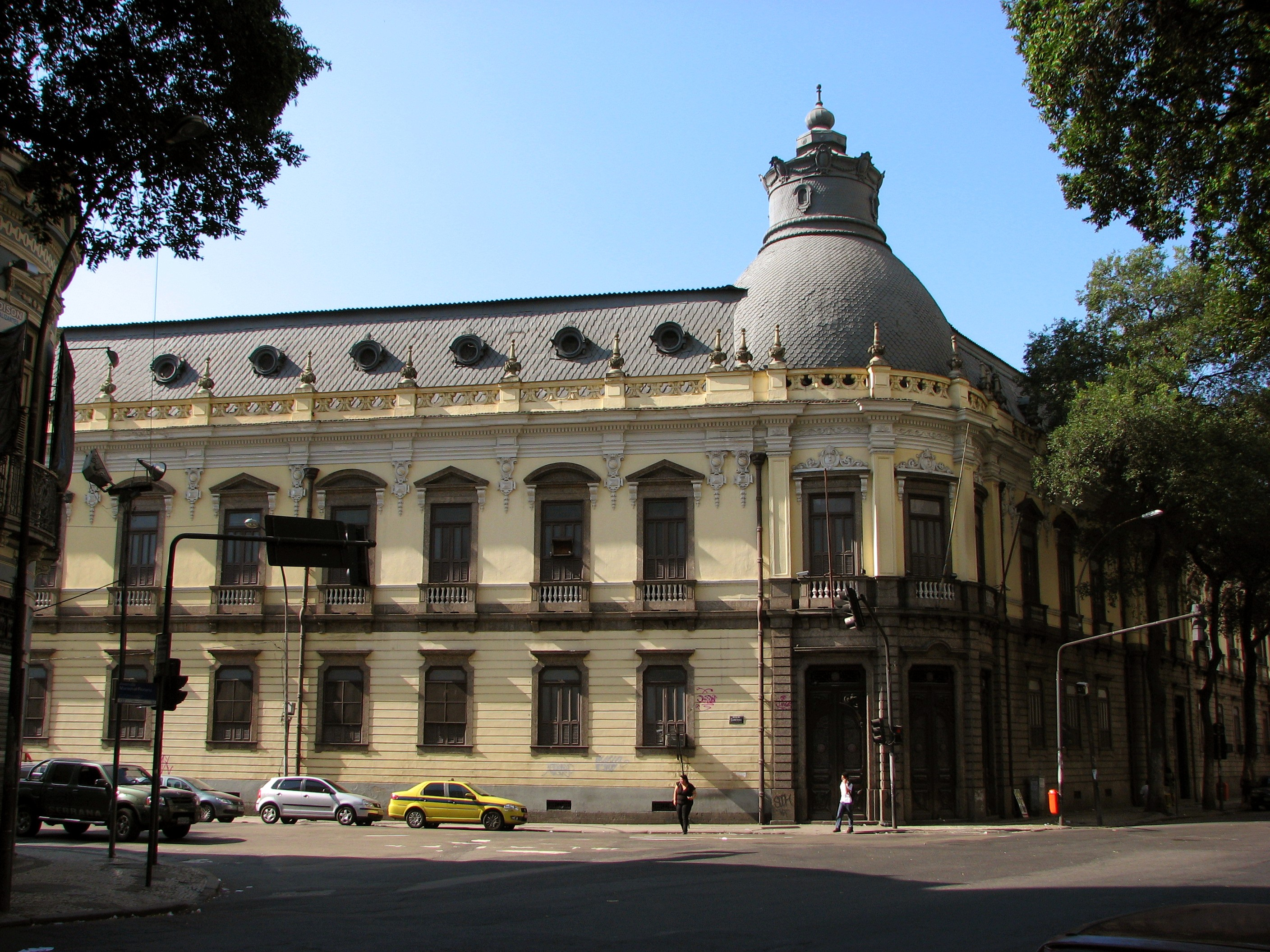

Location
- Campo de São Cristóvão, 177; Rio de Janeiro, Niterói and Duque de Caxias; Brazil, Rio de Janeiro, 20921-903
- Coordinates: 22.8992°S 43.2211°W

Information
- School type: Federal public school
- Motto: "Buscamos no saber a perfeição suprema" (We seek in knowledge the supreme perfection)
- Established: December 2, 1837; 188 years ago
- Rector: Ana Paula Giraux Leitão
- Enrollment: 12000
- Campuses: Humaitá (2 units) Centro; São Cristóvão (3 units); Tijuca (2 units); Realengo (2 units); Engenho Novo (2 units); Duque de Caxias; Niterói

Colégio Pedro II (Pedro II School) is a federal public school located in the state of Rio de Janeiro. Named after Pedro II of Brazil, it was established on 2 December 1837, and made official by Imperial decree on 20 December of the same year. It was named after the Emperor, since it was established on his birthday. Its first campus, downtown Rio de Janeiro, functions to this day.

== History ==
Its origins can be traced to the Saint Peter Orphans' School founded in 1739, and later renamed to Saint Joachim School in 1766.

The Imperial Colégio de Pedro II was established in 1837 as part of a drive for national unity under the monarchy.

The school is mentioned in the Brazilian Constitution, which says that it should remain under the Federal orbit.

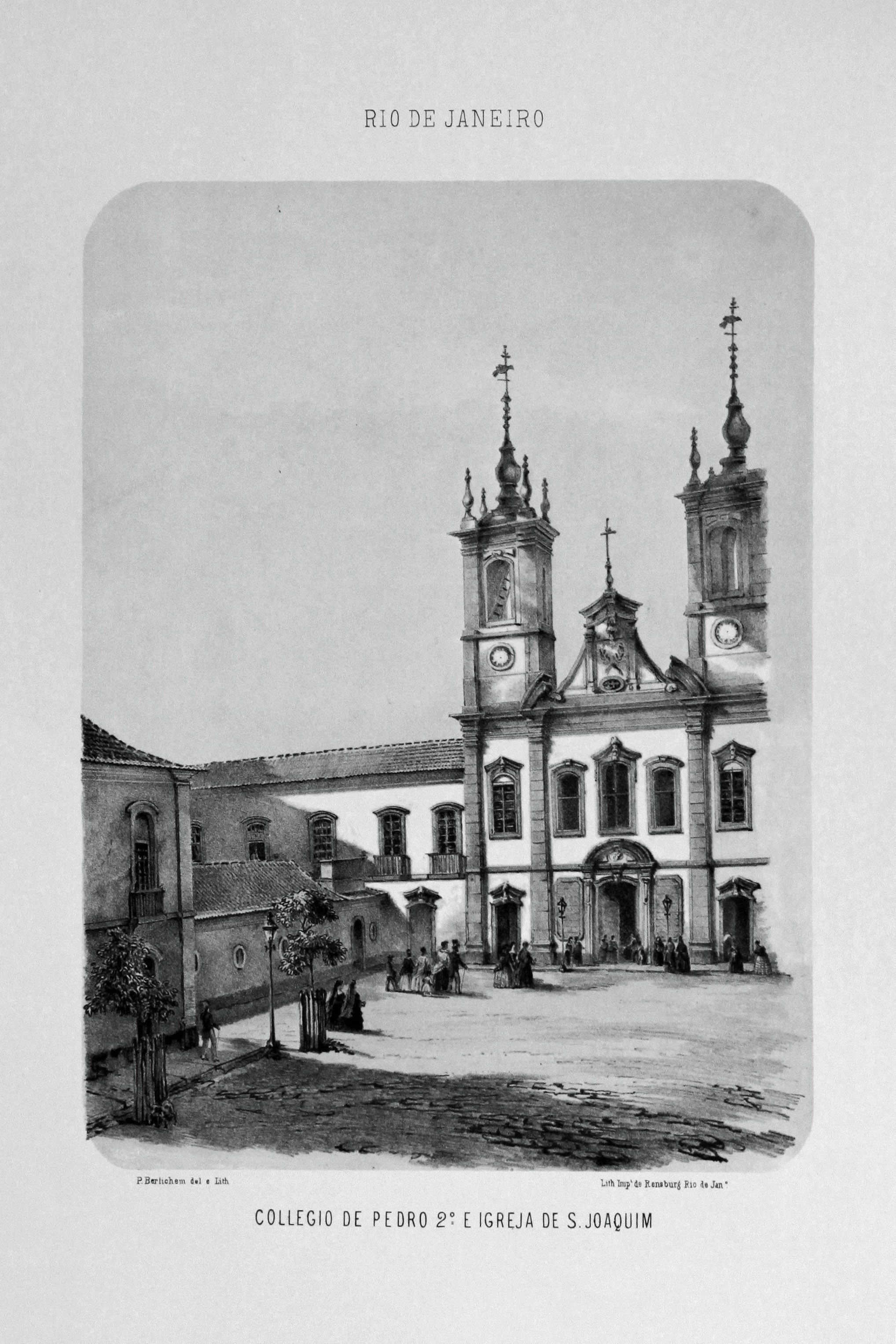
1856

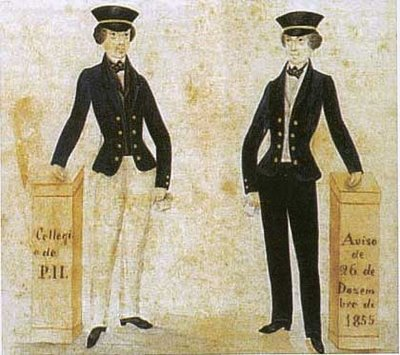
School uniforms (1855)

== Notable faculty ==
- Álvaro Lins, lawyer and journalist, member of the Academia Brasileira de Letras.
- Antônio Gonçalves Dias, poet, lawyer and playwright, author of Canção do Exílio, patron of the 15th chair of the Academia Brasileira de Letras.
- Capistrano de Abreu, historian, writer and former librarian at the National Library of Brazil.
- Euclides da Cunha, journalist and writer, author of Os Sertões, member of the Academia Brasileira de Letras.
- Gonçalves de Magalhães, medic, diplomat and poet, author of Suspiros Poéticos e Saudades, patron of the 9th chair of the Academia Brasileira de Letras.
- João Ubaldo Ribeiro, journalist, writer and philologist, member of the Academia Brasileira de Letras.
- Joaquim Manoel de Macedo, medic, journalist and writer, author of A Moreninha (novel), patron of the 20th chair of the Academia Brasileira de Letras.
- José Veríssimo, writer, educator and journalist, founding member of the Academia Brasileira de Letras.
- Silvio Romero, lawyer and polymath, founding member of the Academia Brasileira de Letras.

== Notable alumni ==
- Andréa Beltrão, actress and producer
- Anitta (singer), singer and entertainer.
- Arlindo Cruz, singer and songwriter.
- Augusto Rademaker, vice president of Brazil during the military dictatorship in Brazil (1969–1974).
- Carlos Chagas Filho, president of the Brazilian Academy of Sciences (1965–1967).
- Cássia Eller, Brazilian singer and songwriter.
- Coelho Netto, writer and member of the Academia Brasileira de Letras.
- Fátima Bernardes, journalist.
- Fernanda Montenegro, actress and member of the Academia Brasileira de Letras.
- Floriano Peixoto, president of Brazil (1891–1894).
- França Júnior, writer and patron of the 12th chair of the Academia Brasileira de Letras.
- Hermes da Fonseca, president of Brazil (1910–1914).
- Ivan Pinheiro, General Secretary of the Brazilian Communist Party (2005–2016).
- João do Rio (João Paulo Emílio Cristóvão dos Santos Coelho Barreto), Brazilian journalist, writer, translator and playwright.
- Jorge Picciani, president of the Legislative Assembly of Rio de Janeiro (2003–2011 and 2015–2017).
- Luís Alves de Lima e Silva, Duke of Caxias
- Luiz Fux, minister of the Supreme Federal Court (2011–).
- Manuel Bandeira, writer and member of the Academia Brasileira de Letras.
- Marco Aurélio Mello, minister of the Supreme Federal Court (1990–2021).
- Maria Luísa Bittencourt, state representative of Bahia (1935–1937).
- Mário Lago, lawyer, poet, broadcaster, songwriter, writer and actor. The theater in the São Cristóvão campus is named after him.
- Mr. Catra, Brazilian rapper.
- Nilo Peçanha, president of Brazil (1909–1910).
- Rodrigues Alves, president of Brazil (1902–1906).
- Washington Luís, president of Brazil (1926–1930).
