= Bettencourt Palace =

Palace in the Azores, Portugal

Palace Bettencourt
- Palácio Bettencourt
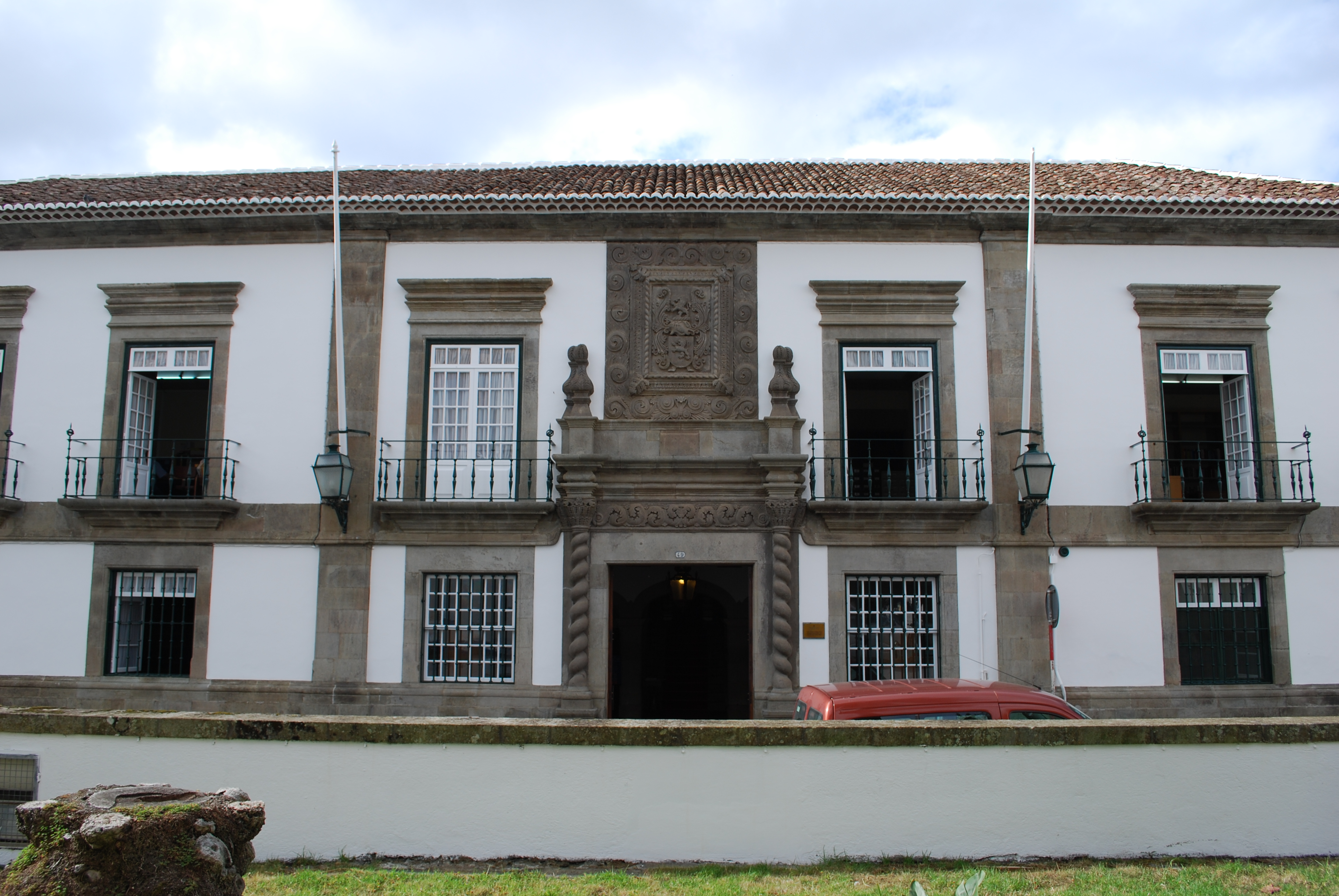
- The main entrance to public library and regional archive which was installed in the Palace Bettencourt during the 20th century
- Interactive map of the Palace Bettencourt area

General information
- Type: Palace
- Architectural style: Medieval
- Location: Terceira, Central, Azores, Portugal
- Coordinates: 38°39′17.11″N 27°13′15.17″W
- Owner: Portuguese Republic

The Palace Bettencourt (Portuguese: Palácio Bettencourt) is a former residence of the Bettencourt family, and current seat of the public library and regional archive, in the civil parish, in the municipality of Angra do Heroísmo, in the Portuguese archipelago of the Azores.

== History ==
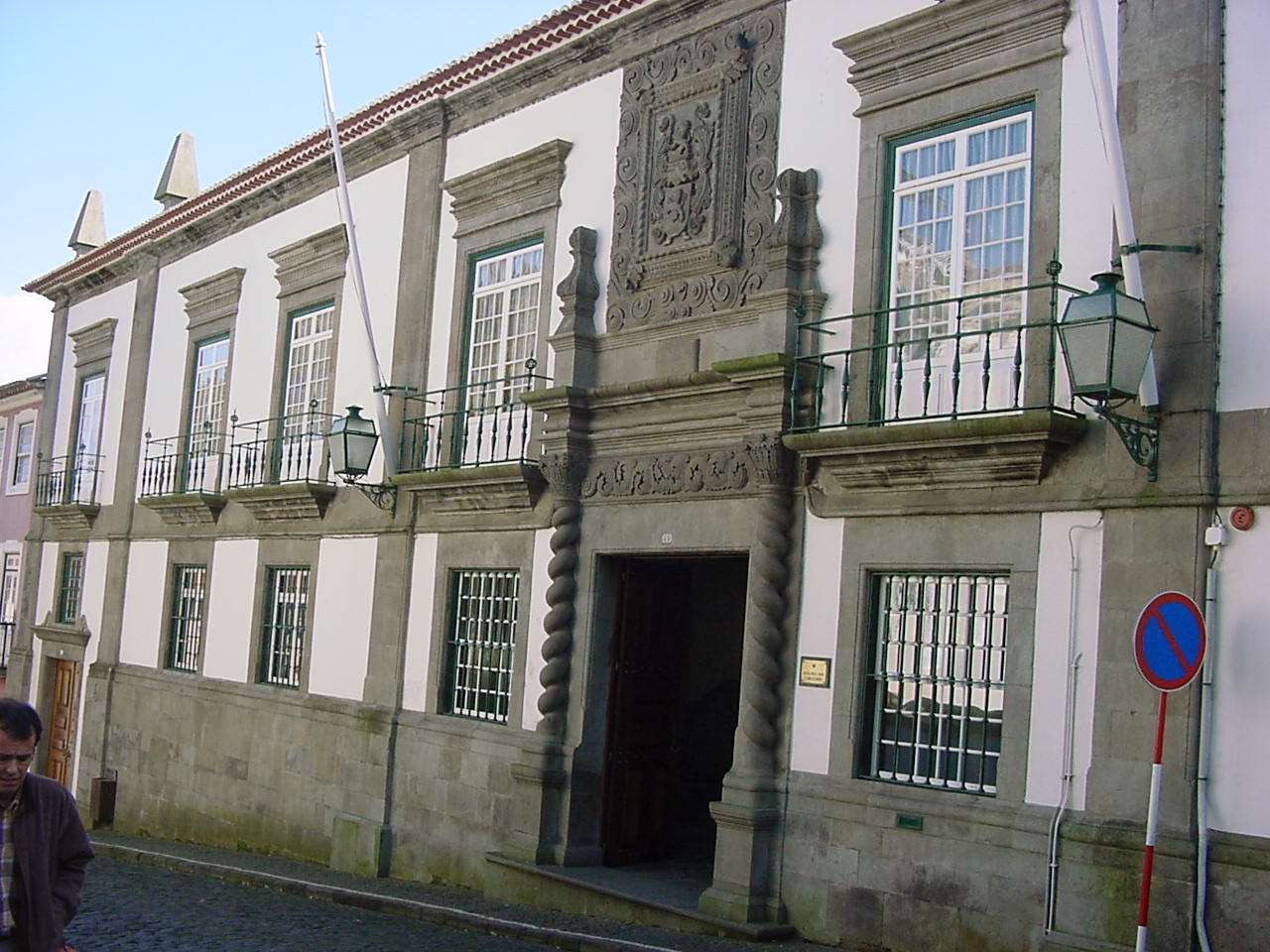
The front facade of the palace, with the large coat-of-arms of the Bettencourt family

It is likely that the building was constructed sometime between the end of the 17th and beginning of the 18th century.

Alterations to the interior and exterior occurred sometime between the 18th and 19th century, at the point when Francisco António de Araújo e Azevedo, then 7th Captain-General of the Azores was in power (the last during the absolutist regime).

Following the fire at the Episcopal Palace, on 31 July 1885, the bishop moved his residence to the Bettencourt palace.

D. Francisco José Ribeiro Vieira de Brito organized a banquet in order to hommage Augusto Castilho, commander of the corvette Duque Terceira on 21 May 1896.

Owing to an epidemic of typhus in the seminary at the Convent of São Francisco resulted in the move of the Lyceum of Angra to the palace. The bishop, who continued to live at the Palace to this period, transferred his residence to Rua D. Amélia, 74. This move lasted until 1913, when the Lyceum was returned to the Convent.

It was sometime in the 20th century, that the facade was remodelled, leading in 1956 to the installation of the public library.

The palace was classified by a resolution-in-council (126/2004) on 9 September 2004, and included within the historical classification of the historic centre of Angra. Three years later, in February, there was a presentation of a public project for a new building for the library and regional archive for Angra.

== Architecture ==
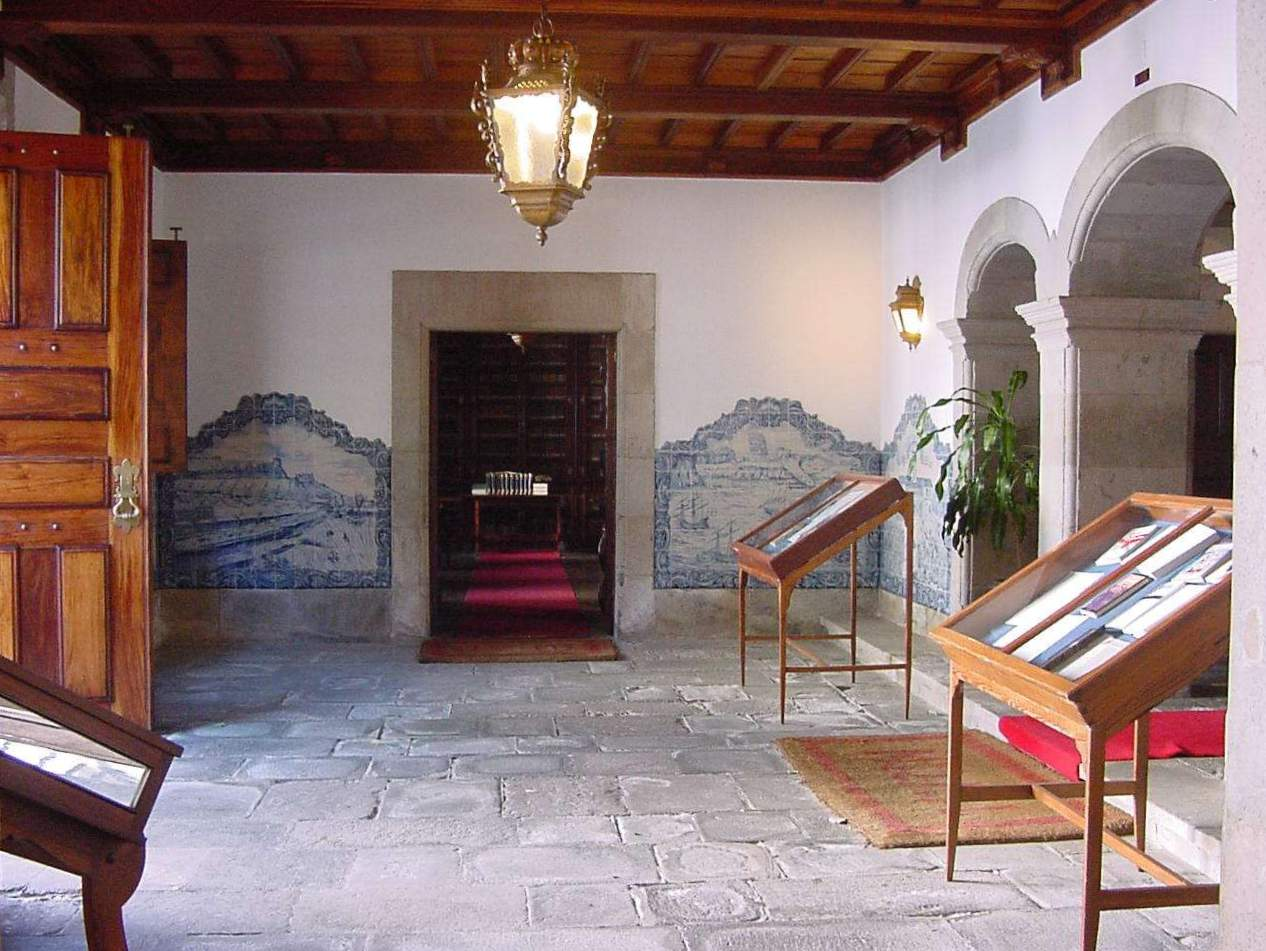
The vestibule, decorated with azulejo panels

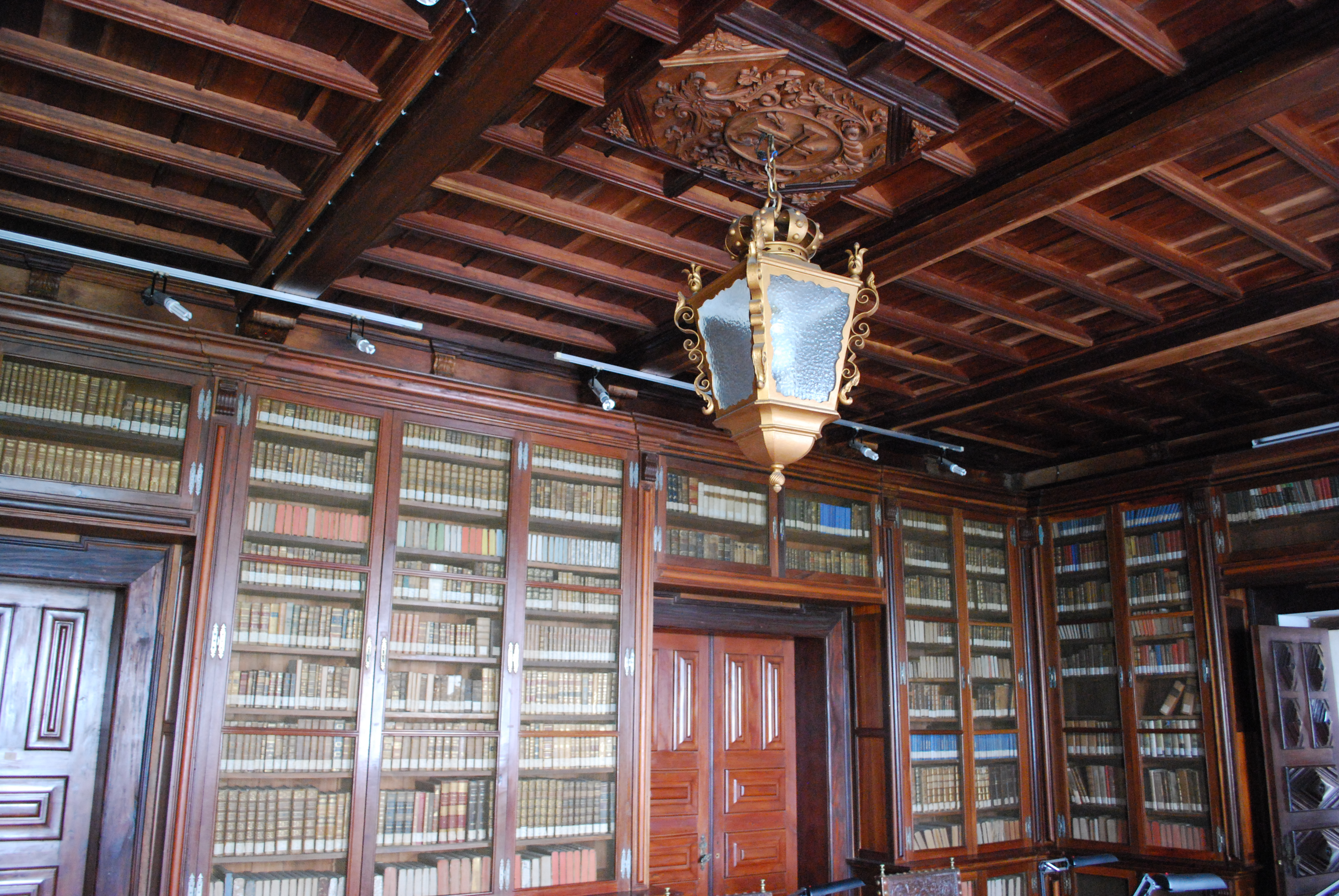
The library spaces, with stacks and ornate wood ceiling

The building is located in a central place, in the city of Angra do Heroísmo, on a subtle declive, with its lateral wings sitting flush with its neighbours. To the south is a small garden, with rectangular wing, while to the front is the Cathedral of the Santíssimo Salvador; and around it are various residences of notable architectural interest, including the palacete Violante Castro.

The principal doorway is framed and decorated with sculpted stone, and surmounted by a large rectangular cartouche with the coat-of-arms of the Bettencourt family.

The architecture conforms to a 17th-century noble residence, in an irregular L-shaped plan, integrating a rectangular tower with two-story facade, separated by friezes and with pilastered corners. There are many decorative elements constructed in basalt, such as the frames, rectangular windows and ornate door. The main facade is marked by picture windows on the first floor and several friezes and cornices over the coat-of-arms of the family. Its interior includes a central vestibule, open to the front by arched entrance over pilasters, from which was constructed a staircase.
