= Montrose Christian School =

Location
- 5100 Randolph Road; North Bethesda (Rockville address), Maryland 20852; United States; 39°3′12″N 77°6′6.5″W

Information
- Type: Private, Christian school
- Motto: Shaping Leaders... Impacting the World!
- Religious affiliation: Christian
- Established: 1977
- Closed: 2013
- Chancellor: Ken Fentress
- Grades: K–12
- Campus type: Suburban
- Website: Montrose Christian School website

Montrose Christian School was a private Christian school in North Bethesda, Maryland, with a Rockville postal address. It was operated by the Montrose Baptist Church, Maryland's second-largest Southern Baptist church. Its first class graduated in 1986, and it educated around 370 students before it closed in 2013.

== Early history ==
Montrose Baptist Church, which had established a nursery school in 1968 and a daycare in 1971, sought to further its evangelical mission by creating a full-time day school. On April 30, 1977, the church incorporated Montrose Christian School in Rockville, Maryland. Starting with a kindergarten class of five children, the school expanded the next year to grades 1-4, then added a grade or two each year until it graduated its first class of high schoolers in May 1986.

== Athletics ==
The school had been recognized for its athletic accomplishments, particularly for those of its basketball team, which recruited players across the United States and around the world to play in Rockville. Kevin Durant's transfer to the school led USA Today to name Montrose its preseason pick for the top spot on its Super 25 rankings of the top high school basketball teams in 2005-06.

The school had appeared regularly on USA Today's Super 25 national rankings, finishing the season ranked 25th in 2000-01, 9th in 2002-03, 19th in 2003-04, 19th in 2005-06 and 22nd in 2006-07.

== Controversies ==
in February 1997, the school was sued by three employees, represented by the ACLU, who said they were fired for not belonging to the school's parent church. A judge ruled in the favor of the dismissed employees, but the decision was overturned on appeal in 2001 based on the argument that "'for a religious corporation, association, or society to hire and employ employees of a particular religion,' is severable and valid."

In October 2002, Reverend Ray Hope, a.k.a. Dr. Otis Ray Hope, senior pastor at the Montrose Baptist Church, resigned after the church's governing council questioned his involvement with the Maryland International Students Association, an organization that recruited foreign students attending Montrose Christian School. Church officials alleged that the recruiting organization had failed to reimburse the school for the cost of the students' education and that Hope owed the school more than $580,000.

In February 2012, a female teacher at Montrose Christian School was arrested and charged with sexually abusing a student for more than a year.

Due to fiscal mismanagement, the school had suffered from financial difficulties in its later years and had 16 liens placed against its properties.

== Notable alumni ==
- Justin Anderson (born 1993), professional basketball player
- Isaiah Armwood (born 1990), professional basketball player
- Miguel "Ali" Berdiel (born 1983), Puerto Rican former professional basketball player
- Carmelo Betancourt (born 1993), professional basketball player
- Jarrell Brantley (born 1996), professional basketball player
- Jason Conley (born 1981), first freshman basketball player to lead NCAA Division I in scoring
- Kevin Durant (born 1988), former NBA basketball player
- Tyrone Johnson (born 1992), former professional basketball player.
- Linas Kleiza (born 1985), former NBA basketball player
- K.J. Matsui (born 1985), played guard on the Columbia University basketball team, becoming the first Japanese-born NCAA Division I player
- Patrick McCaw (born 1995), professional basketball player.
- Terrence Ross (born 1991), former NBA player
- Josh Tillman (born 1981), musician known as Father John Misty.
- Yuki Togashi (born 1992), Japanese professional basketball player.
- Greivis Vasquez (born 1987), former professional basketball player, and Venezuela national team
- Ish Wainright (born 1994), American-Ugandan professional basketball player
