= António Xavier Machado e Cerveira =

Portuguese organ builder (1756–1828)

António Xavier Machado e Cerveira (Tamengos, Anadia, 1 September 1756-Caxias, 14 September 1828) was a Portuguese organ builder. He is considered one of the most remarkable Portuguese Baroque organ builders.

== Built instruments ==
Number	Year	Church	City	Photography	Stop number	Accessories	Current state
2	1784	São Roque Church	Lisboa				Operational
3	1785	Mártires Church	Lisboa		14 (LH) + 16 (RH)		Operational
22	1788	Nossa Senhora da Guia Church - Angra do Heroísmo Museum (former São Francisco convent)	Angra do Heroísmo		11 (RH) + 11 (LH)	Mixture Stop (2 footpads)	Operational
23	1789	Mártires Basilica (High choir)	Lisboa				Inoperational
24	1790	Calheta Parish Church	Calheta		5 (LH) + 5 (RH)	Mixture stop (2 footpads)	Operational
32	1791	Mártires Basilica (Choir organ)	Lisboa				Operational
36	1792	Chagas Church	Lisboa				Inoperational
38	1793	São Mateus da Praia Church	Santa Cruz		6 (LH) + 6 (RH)	Mixture stop (2 footpads)	Operational
40	1793	Praia da Vitória Parish Church	Praia da Vitória		8 (LH) + 8 (RH)	Mixture stop (2 footpads)	Operational
46	1795	Covões Church	Covões				
47	1795	Lorvão Monastery	Lorvão				Operational
53		Misericórdia de Viseu Church	Viseu		32		Inoperational
56	1798	Nossa Senhora do Carmo Church (College)	Angra do Heroísmo		10 (LH) + 10 (RH)	Mixture stop (2 footpads) / Reed stop (2 footpads) / C and F drums	
72	1806	Nossa Senhora do Socorro Church	Lisboa				Inoperational
83	1817	Santíssimo Sacramento Parish Church	Lisboa				Inoperational
87	1818	Misericórdia Church	Santarém		10 (LH) + 10 (RH)	Mixture and reed stop (2 footsliders)	Operational
96	1822	Victória Church	Lisboa				Operational
98	1826	Nossa Senhora da Encarnação Church	Lisboa				
102	1828	Igreja Matriz (São Sebastião), Ponta Delgada					
103	1828		Barreiro				
		Nossa Senhora da Ajuda Church	Lisboa		10 (LH) + 11 (RH)	Operational	
