= Mary Jane Wallner =

American politician (born 1946)

Deputy Minority Leader of the New Hampshire House of Representatives
- Incumbent
- Assumed office March 25, 2022; Acting: March 2, 2022 – March 25, 2022
- Leader: David Cote
- Preceded by: David Cote

Majority Leader of the New Hampshire House of Representatives
- In office 2007 – December 1, 2010
- Preceded by: Michael O’Neill
- Succeeded by: D.J. Bettencourt

Member of the New Hampshire House of Representatives from the Merrimack 10th district
- Incumbent
- Assumed office December 3, 1980

Personal details
- Born: October 25, 1946 (age 79) St. Louis, Missouri, U.S.
- Party: Democratic
- Spouse: Nicholas
- Education: University of New Hampshire (BS)
- Profession: Educator

Mary Jane Wallner (born October 25, 1946) is a Democratic member of the New Hampshire House of Representatives, one of the three members representing the Merrimack 10th District since 1980. She served as the Majority Leader from 2007 to 2010.
