= Madre de Deus Manor =

Manor of Madre de Deus
- Solar da Madre de Deus
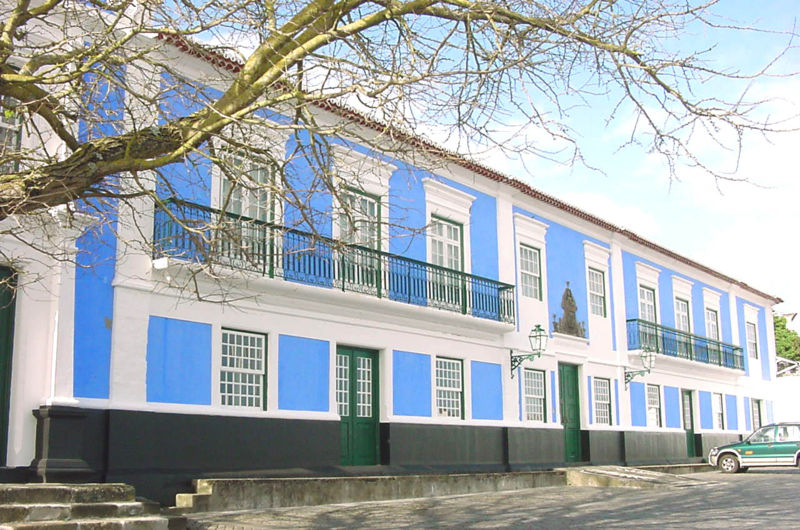
- The main facade of the Madre de Deus Manor

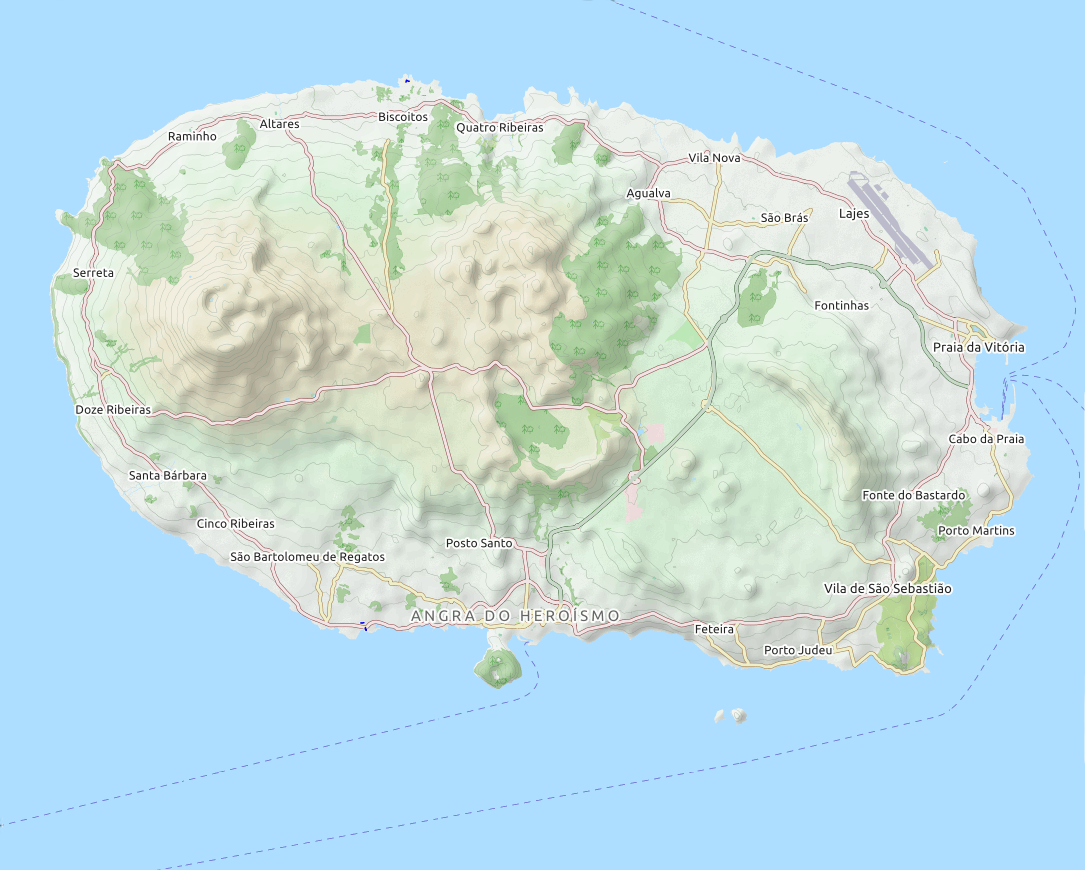
- Location within Terceira

General information
- Type: Manorhouse
- Architectural style: Baroque
- Location: Sé, Angra do Heroísmo, Portugal
- Coordinates: 38°39′27.40″N 27°13′27.96″W
- Opened: 17th century
- Owner: Portuguese Republic

UNESCO World Heritage Site
- Official name: Central Zone of the Town of Angra do Heroismo in the Azores
- Location: Europe and North America
- Criteria: iv, vi
- Reference: 206
- Inscription: 1983 (7th Session)

Manor of Madre de Deus (Portuguese: Solar da Madre de Deus) is a historic former residence of the Bettencourt family in the civil parish of Sé, in the municipality of Angra do Heroísmo, in the Portuguese archipelago of the Azores. It is the official residence of the Representative of the Republic to the Azores.

== History ==
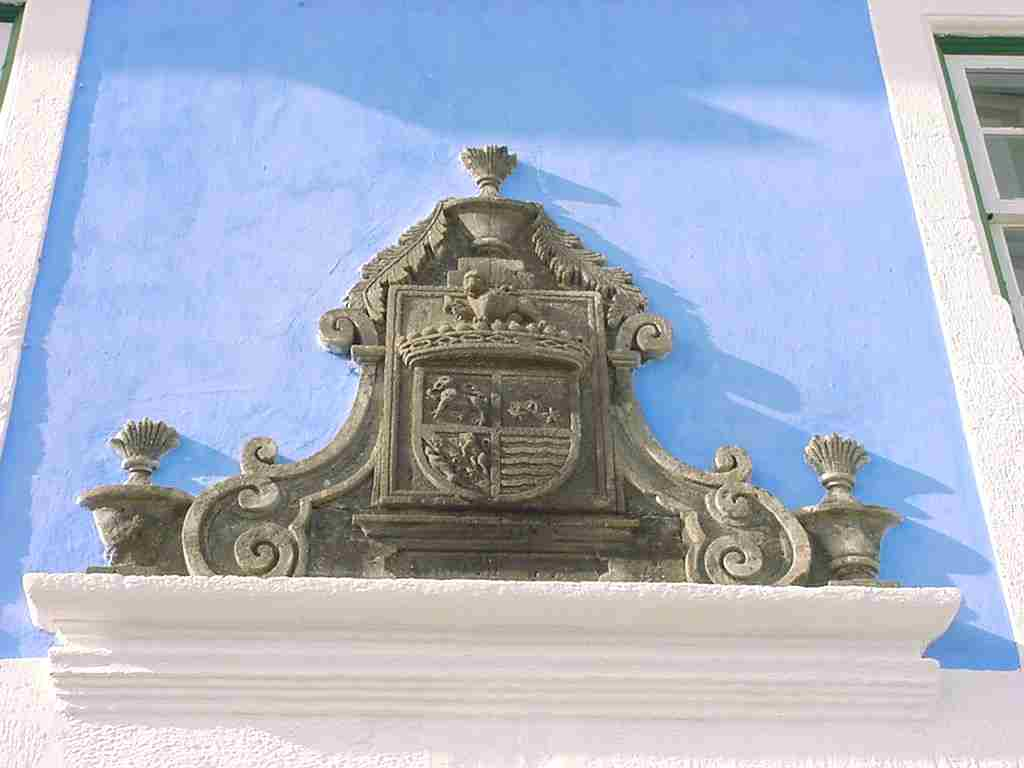
The coat-of-arms of the Bettencourt family above the main doorway

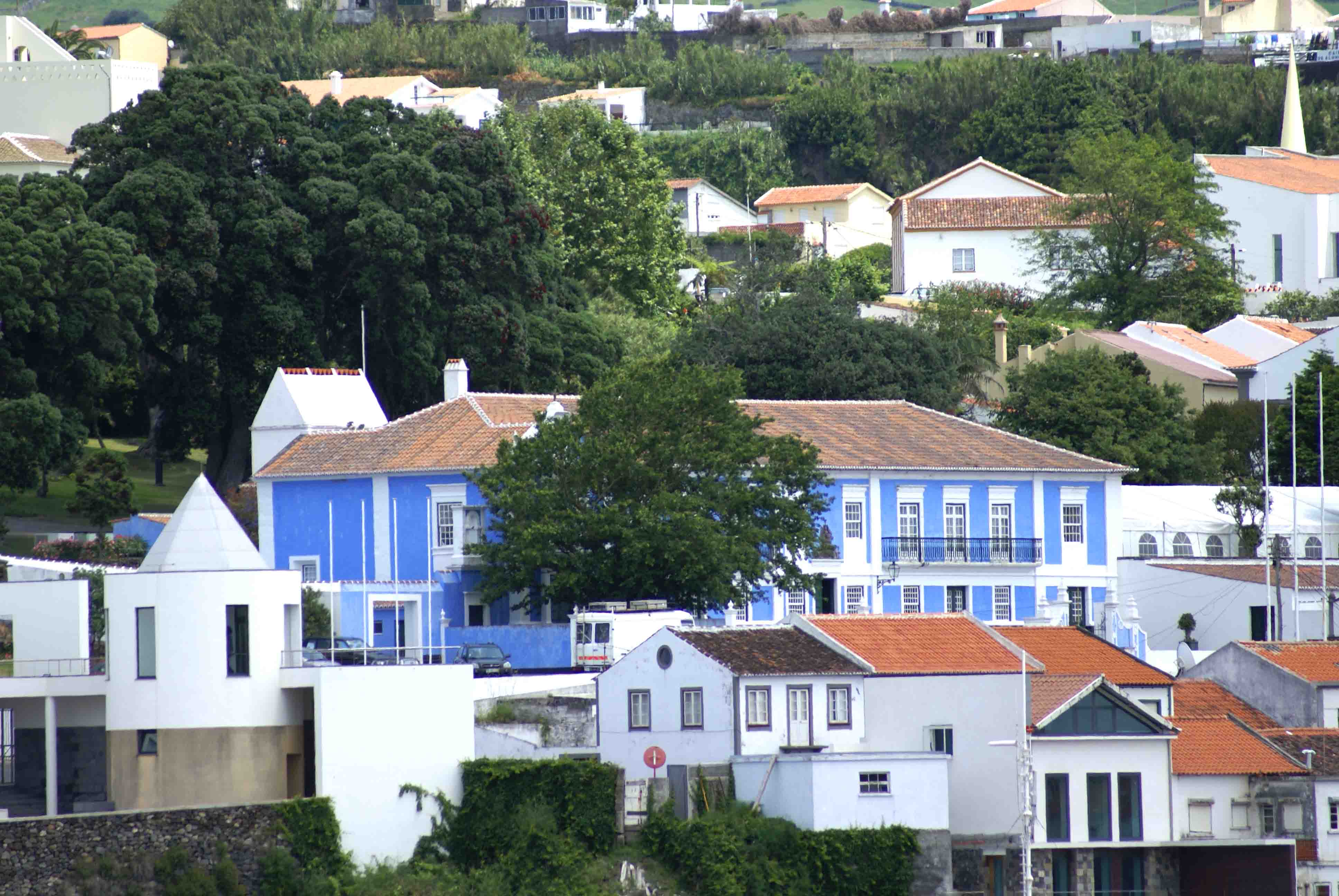
The location of the manorhouse in the foothills of Angra do Heroísmo.

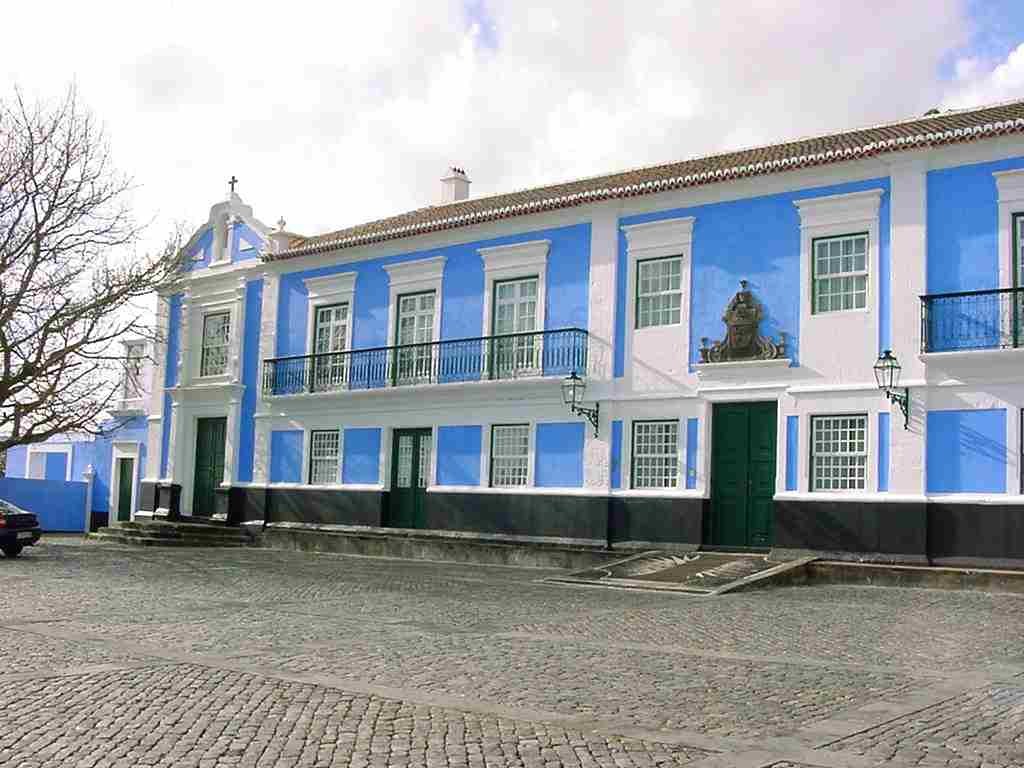
The left wing of the manor, showing the chapel/hermitage

The manor was constructed by the Majorat and Captain-major of Angra, João de Bettencourt de Vasconcelos (an extended member of the Bettencourt family) in the second half of the 17th century, from a small residence whose principal facade was oriented towards the east (now the wall dividing the dining-room in the principal edifice).

João de Bettencourt de Vasconcelos, along with his brother-in-law, Captain-major Francisco Ornelas da Câmara (who presided over the local Military War Council) used this building in 1641 during their blockade of the fortress of São João Baptista, and carved-out trenches around the building in order to defend the site.

Following years of political instability, the site became a centre of equestrianism on Terceira, with various redoubts and ring, supporting and teaching several famous bullfighters from around the island.

The small chapel at the site is dedicated to the invocation of Nossa Senhora da Madre de Deus (Our Lady the Mother of God) and was constructed in 1727, under the initiative of Vital de Bettencourt de Vasconcelos, the great-great-grandson of João de Bettencourt. The following year, on 15 June, the Bishop of Angra, D. Manuel Álvares da Costa, passed a charter to establish a cult, owing to "the parameters necessary, bell-tower and doorway towards the road". This last detail implied that the hermitage was a public space, since the door was allows to be open to those who wished to attend the religious services.

The old gate, that gave rise to the patio, the fountain and the entranceway were part of the elaborate changes made by the older owners. Over the main doorway is the coat-of-arms of the Bettencourt family.

The 1980 Azores earthquake caused serious damage to the internal structure of the building, demanding major repairs, consolidation of walls and restore of spaces. Yet, owing to the expense, the family sold the estate to the State, which was restored and re-qualified to serve as the cabinet of the Ministry of the Republic in the Azores.

The manor of Madre de Deus was classified as a Imóvel de Interesse Público (Property of Public Interest) by resolution 41/80 (11 June 1980), and included within the central zone of the historic centre of Angra do Heroísmo.

== Architecture ==
The former manorhouse is situated within the limits of the historic centre of Angra do Heroísmo, and is the current official residence and district centre of the Republican representative to the Azores.

It is an example of the larger manorhouses that were constructed in the 17th century, that supported a large rural estate (that extended to the north of the residence). This manor continued to be held by descendants until the 1980 Azores earthquake, when the former property-owners sold the building to the State.

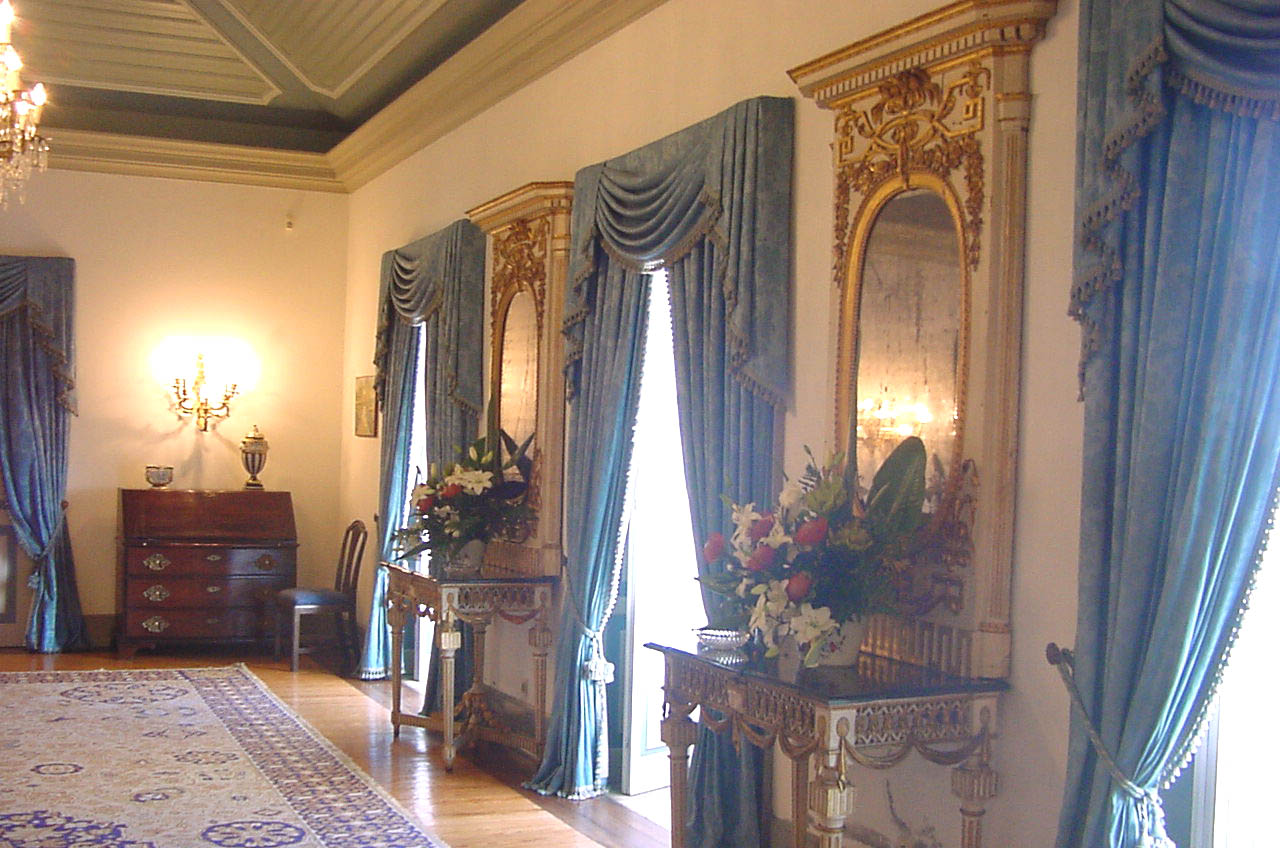
An aspect of the sala nobre (noble hall)

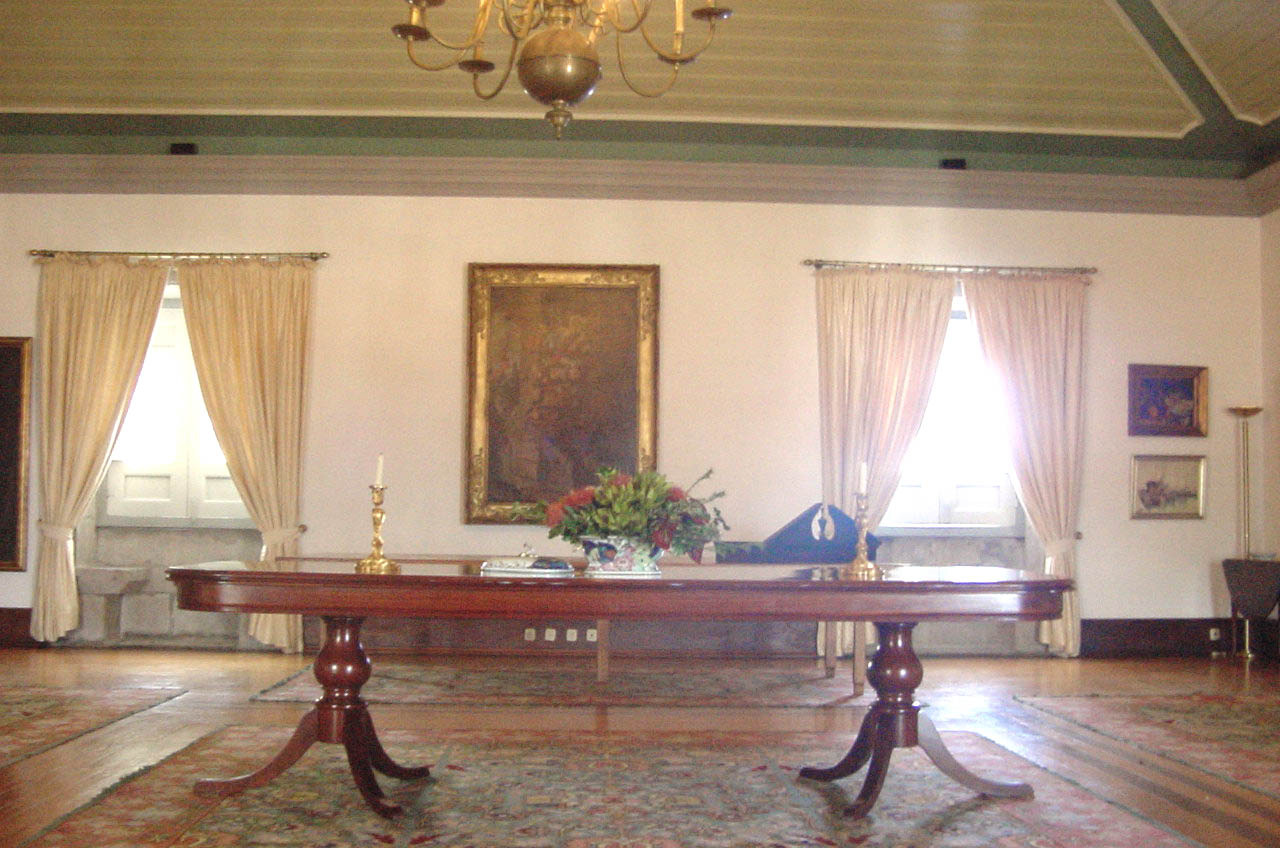
The elegant wood table in the noble hall

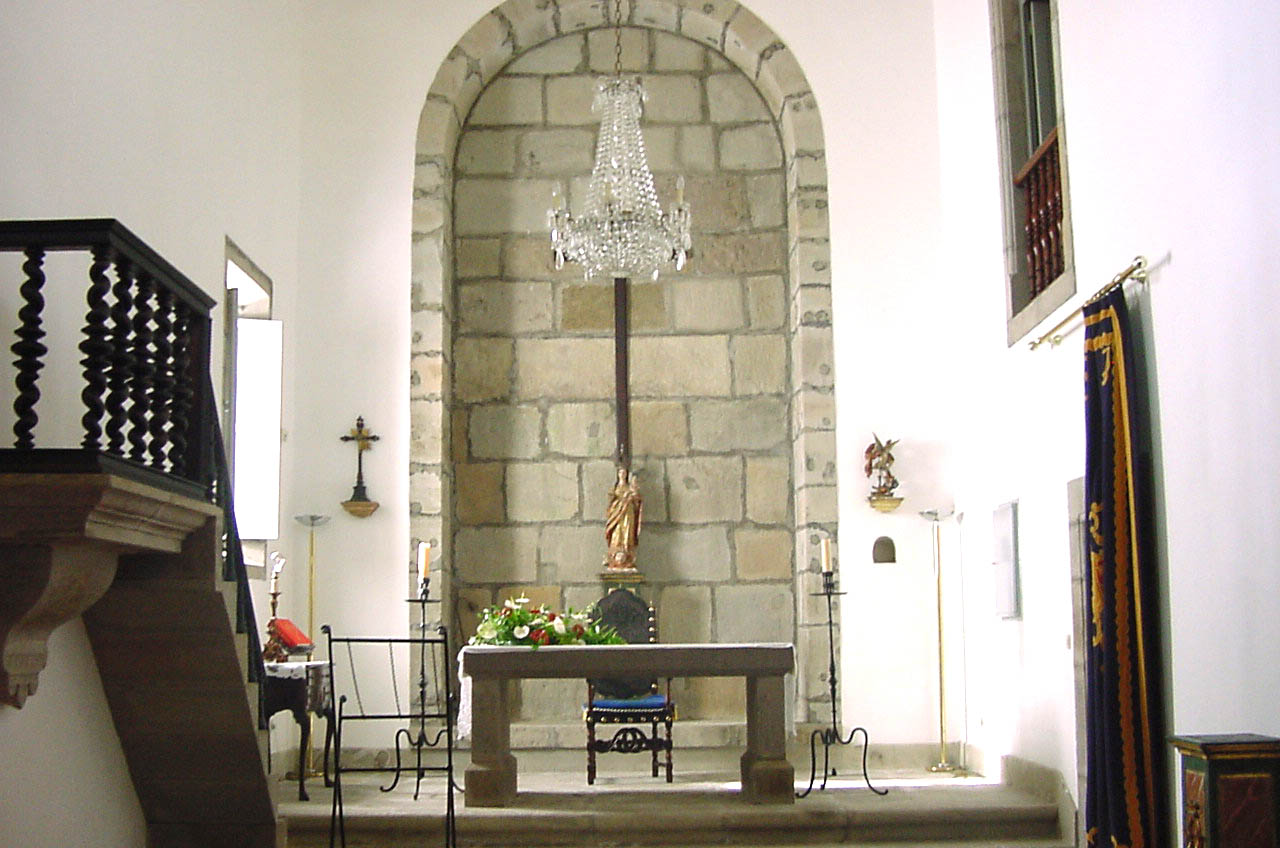
The interior of the chapel
