= Bethancourt =

Bethancourt is a surname, a variant of Bettencourt. Notable people with the surname include:

- Brandon Bethancourt, member of electronic band Alaska in Winter
- Christian Bethancourt (born 1991), Panamanian baseball player
- Joe Bethancourt (1946–2014), American folk musician
- Mat Bethancourt, member of English stoner rock band The Kings of Frog Island
