= Maria Luísa Bittencourt =

Brazilian politician

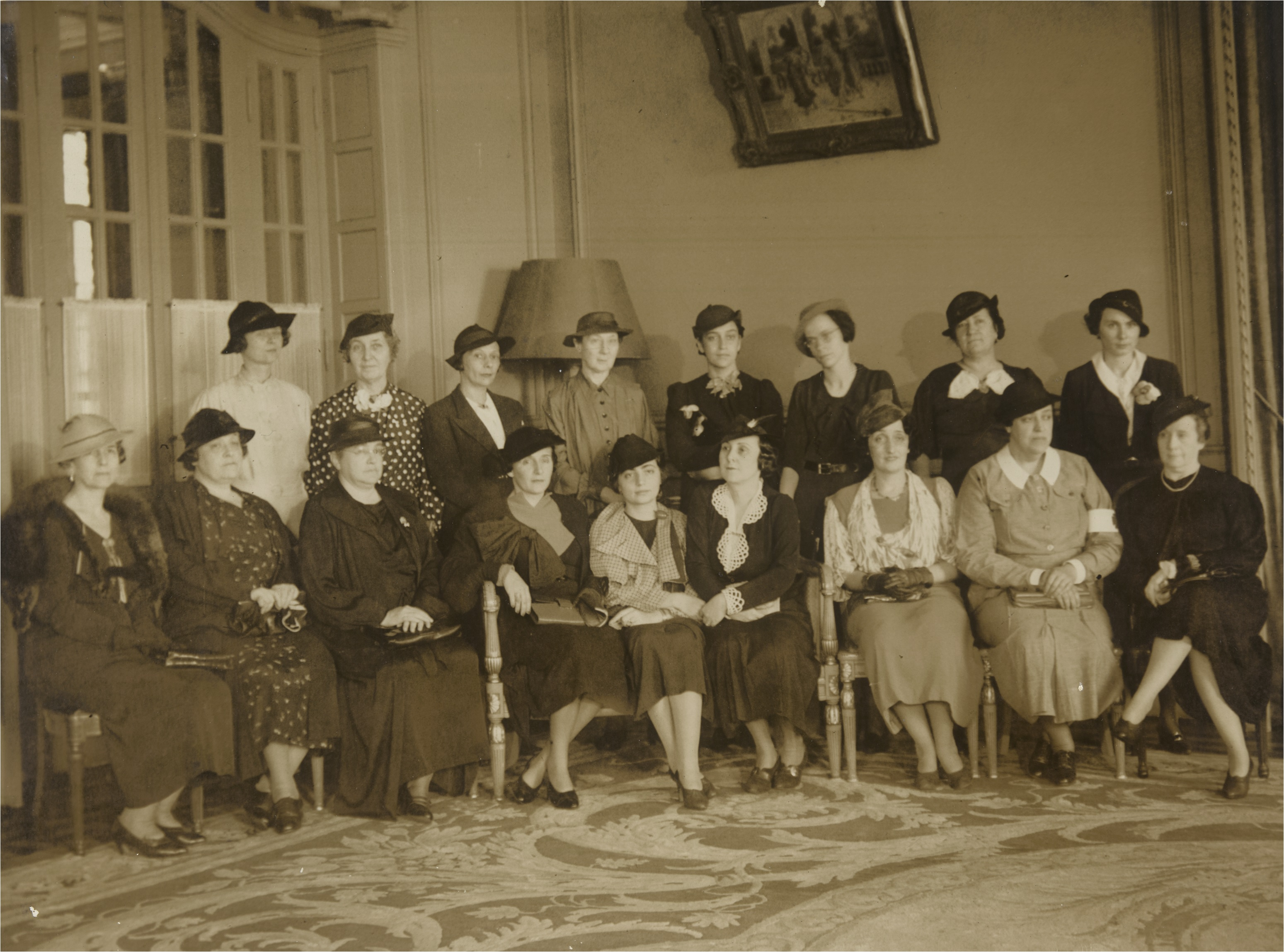
- Luncheon offered to Maria Luísa Bittencourt, elected Constituent Deputy in Bahia, at the Hotel Glória, Rio de Janeiro, on November 26, 1936. Brazilian National Archives

Federal deputy
- In office 6 May 1935 – 1937
- Constituency: Bahia

Personal details
- Born: Maria Luísa Dória Bittencourt; 1910 Salvador, Bahia, Brazil
- Died: 2001 (aged 90–91)
- Party: Social Democratic Party of Bahia
- Occupation: Politician, activist, lawyer

Maria Luísa Dória Bittencourt, better known as Maria Luísa Bittencourt (Salvador, Bahia, 1910–2001), was a Brazilian politician and feminist. She was the first female state deputy of Bahia, holding the position from May 1935 to 1937. She was affiliated with the Federação Brasileira pelo Progresso Feminino (FBPF).

== Biography ==
Maria Luísa Bittencourt was born in Paripe, a subdistrict of Salvador, daughter of Luiz de Lima Bittencourt and Isaura Dória Bittencourt.

Her basic studies were completed at Colégio Pedro II and, after being one of the rare women who managed to enter higher education in 1927, four years later she graduated with a bachelor's degree from the Federal University of Rio de Janeiro Faculty of Law. She decided to join the Federação Brasileira pelo Progresso Feminino at the age of 20, developing a friendship with Bertha Lutz. At that time, she became one of the founders of the Brazilian Association of University Women.

After graduating in law in Rio de Janeiro in 1931, she returned to Bahia, where she joined the local feminist movement, becoming a notable activist. Maria Luísa Bittencourt would become involved in local politics, running for election to the Bahia State Constituent Assembly in 1935.

In 1935, she received a Fellowship award from Radcliffe College, where she attended and, the following year, completed a specialization in social economics, finance and rationalization.

After the closure of the Bahian legislature, she established a law office in Rio de Janeiro with Maria Rita Soares Andrade, a lawyer from Sergipe who would become the first female federal judge in Brazil. The office was located on Rua da Quitanda, in downtown Rio de Janeiro.

With the end of the Estado Novo in 1945, she participated in the founding of the National Democratic Union (UDN), even supporting Eduardo Gomes' candidacy for president of the Republic. In 1947, she ran for a seat as a city councilor in the Federal District for the Democratic Left (a party that would change its name to the Brazilian Socialist Party), but was not elected.

She served as interim president of the Casa do Estudante do Brasil (Brazilian Student House) in 1951, an organization in which she had previously held positions on the board of directors.

At approximately 78 years of age, in 1988, she received the Ruy Barbosa Merit Diploma from the Brazilian Association of University Women for being the first woman to serve on the Constituent Assembly of Bahia.

== Political career ==
Maria Luísa was elected, representing the Social Democratic Party of Bahia, as an alternate state deputy to the constituent assembly and, at the age of 25, she assumed the parliamentary mandate in May 1935, due to the absence of state deputy Humberto Pacheco Miranda.

At that time, the election of women was very rare, and throughout Brazil, only four other women had been elected state deputies: Lily Lages (Alagoas); Alaíde Borba (São Paulo); Quintina Diniz (Sergipe); and Marta Miranda Jordão (Amazonas). Therefore, Maria Luísa Bittencourt was the first woman elected to assume the mandate of state deputy in Bahia.

She was politically linked to the group of the interventor Juracy Magalhães, having a prominent role in the Bahia State Constituent Assembly, where she actively participated in the "Commission of Nine" (Comissão dos Nove) the group responsible for drafting the constitutional text. She ended up being the rapporteur for the chapters on Education and Economic and Social Order in the 1935 Bahia State Constitution.

In 1936, she suggested to the interventor Juracy Magalhães the name of Nair Guimarães Lacerda to hold the public office of municipal interventor (mayor) of the Urandi municipality. Because of this political maneuver by Maria Luísa, Nair Lacerda became the first woman to hold the position of head of the Municipal Executive Branch in the state of Bahia.

One characteristic of her parliamentary pronouncements was the defense of the rights of women in Bahia and of democracy, having risen up in 1937 against the coup d'état of the Estado Novo and the closure of the state parliament by the Getúlio Vargas dictatorship.
