= Bettencourt-Rivière =

- Commune
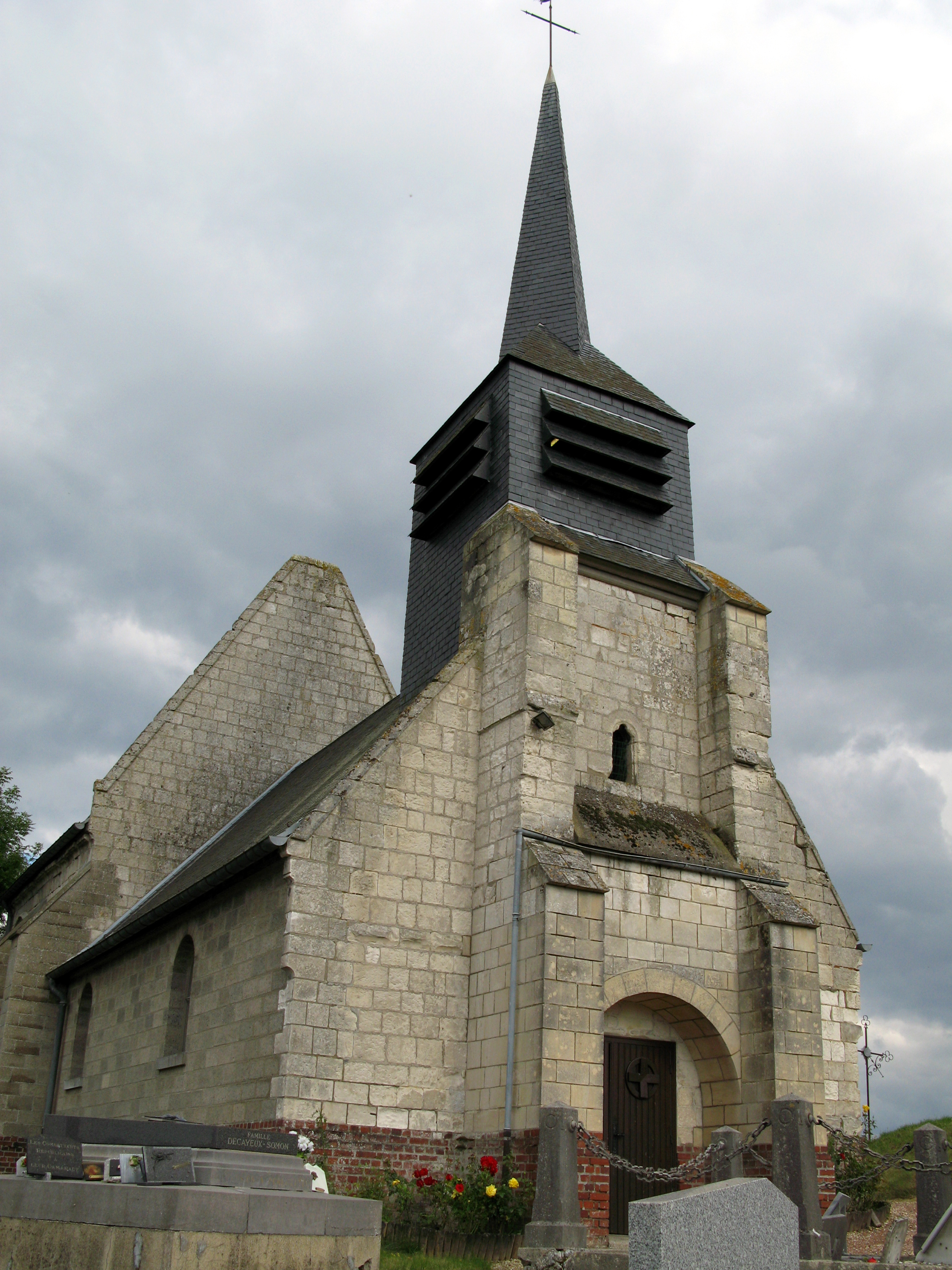
- The church in Bettencourt-Rivière

- Coat of arms
- Location of Bettencourt-Rivière
- Location within France Location within Hauts-de-France
- Coordinates: 49°59′52″N 1°58′41″E
- Country: France
- Region: Hauts-de-France
- Department: Somme
- Arrondissement: Abbeville
- Canton: Gamaches
- Intercommunality: CA Baie de Somme

Government
  - Mayor (2021–2026): Maryline Deroussent
- Area^{1}: 7.38 km^{2} (2.85 sq mi)
- Elevation: 20 m (66 ft)
- Highest elevation: 94 m (308 ft)
- Lowest elevation: 11 m (36 ft)
- Population (2023): 209
  - Density: 28.3/km^{2} (73.3/sq mi)
- Time zone: UTC+01:00 (CET)
  - Summer (DST): UTC+02:00 (CEST)
- INSEE/Postal code: 80099 /80270
- ^{1} French Land Register data, which excludes lakes, ponds, glaciers > 1 km^{2} (0.386 sq mi or 247 acres) and river estuaries.

Bettencourt-Rivière is a commune in the Somme department in Hauts-de-France in northern France.

== Geography ==
The commune is situated on the D216 road, some 15 miles (24 km) southeast of Abbeville. The commune is made up of two villages: Bettencourt to the west, on the left bank of the small river Airaines and Rivière to the east, on the right bank of the river.

== Population ==
Historical population
Year	Pop.	±% p.a.
1968	183	—
1975	168	−1.21%
1982	161	−0.61%
1990	200	+2.75%
1999	212	+0.65%
2007	223	+0.63%
2012	207	−1.48%
2017	230	+2.13%
2023	209	−1.58%
Source: INSEE

== Places of interest ==
- Bettencourt church
- Rivière church

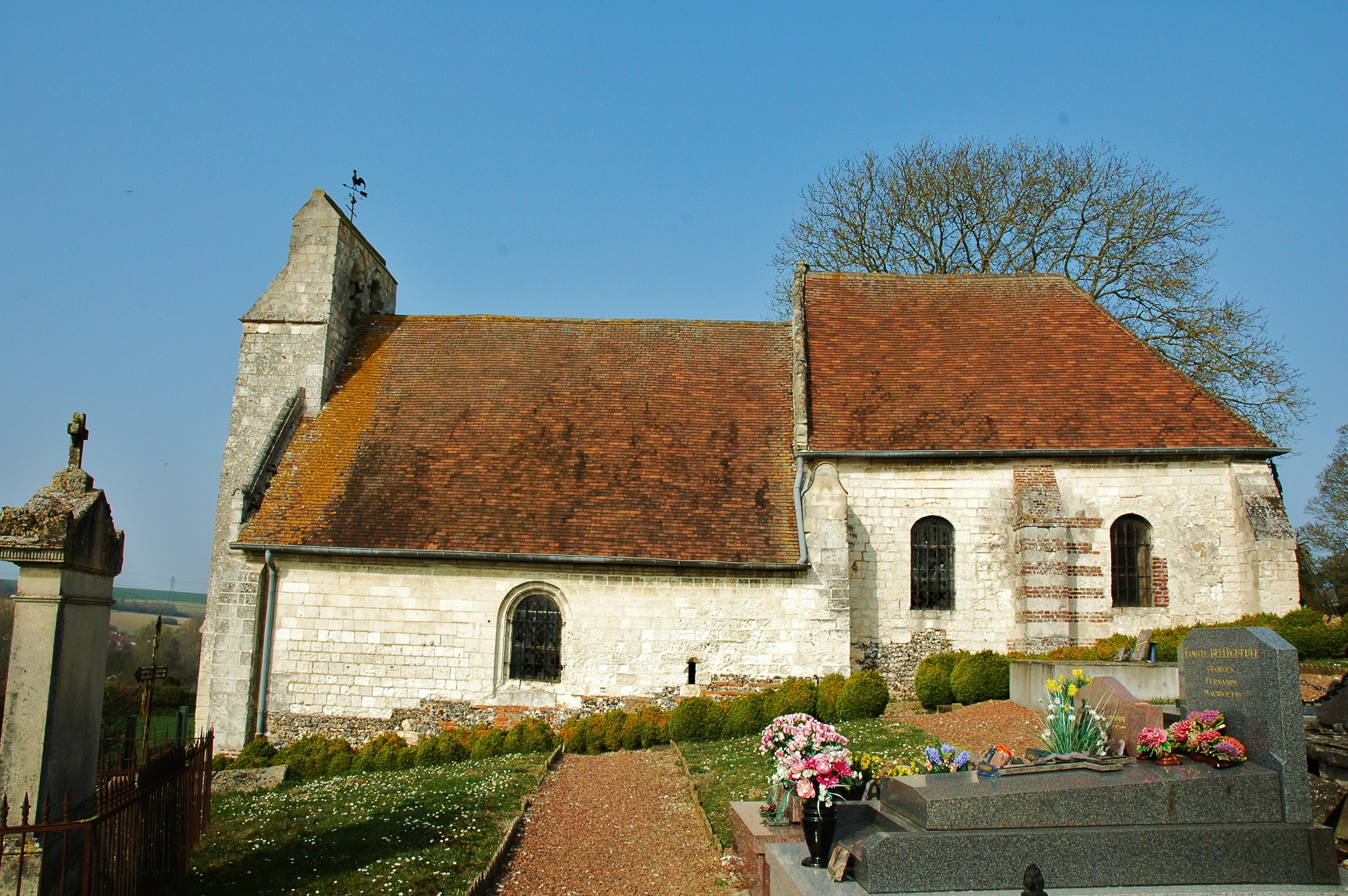
Rivière church

== See also ==
- Communes of the Somme department
