= João de Bettencourt de Vasconcelos =

João de Bettencourt de Vasconcelos (Angra, 3 July 1589 — Angra, 1670) was an aristocrat, who served as Captain-major of Angra, involved in the acclamation of John of Braganza, as King John IV of Portugal in the islands of the central group of the Azores, and in the expulsion of Spanish forces from the island of Terceira.

== Biography ==
He was the majorat of one of the more prominent families on the island of Terceira, and brother-in-law of Francisco Ornelas da Câmara. His home was the Manor of Madre de Deus in the centre of the historic centre.

On 4 March 1642, he assumed the governorship of the Fortress of São João Baptista, when Spanish forces capitulated to the forces of his brother-in-law, following a months-long blockade, by local forces loyal to the restored Braganza monarchy.

For his efforts, on 20 May 1624, he received honours of nobility and, by charter, on 12 April 1642, the Commandership of Santa Maria de Tondela. He eventually received the title of Captain-major of Angra do Heroísmo on 27 April 1646 for his faithful service to the Crown.
