= Carmelo Betancourt =

Puerto Rican-American basketball player

- Betancourt – point guard.

No. 6 – Cangrejeros de Santurce
- Position: Point guard
- League: BSN

Personal information
- Born: February 28, 1993 (age 33) San Juan, Puerto Rico
- Listed height: 5 ft 11 in (1.80 m)
- Listed weight: 185 lb (84 kg)

Career information
- High school: Colegio Adianez (Guaynabo, Puerto Rico); Montrose Christian School (Rockville, Maryland)
- College: Akron (2012–2014); UPRRP (2015–2017)
- Playing career: 2017–present

Career history
- 2017–18: Indios de Mayagüez
- 2020–2021: Grises de Humacao
- 2021–2022: Capitanes de Arecibo
- 2022–2023: Cangrejeros de Santurce

Carmelo Betancourt Carbonell (born February 28, 1993) is a Puerto Rican-American former basketball player for the Cangrejeros de Santurce of the Baloncesto Superior Nacional (BSN).Player of the year (2007) of the Federation of Basketball of Puerto Rico. He earlier played for the Gallitos de Rio Piedras of the Liga Atlética Interuniversitaria (LAI), and the Akron Zips during his college basketball career.

== High school career ==
Betancourt attended Colegio Adianez where he helped his team win the 2009 McDonald High School Tournament. He finished his junior season averaging 12.3 points, 8.6 assists and 2.0 steals per game. He graduated from Montrose Christian School where he was two-year starter. He helped Montrose Christian School to a 24–1 record and a victory over Oak Hill Academy in the 2011 ESPN Rise National High School Champion game averaging 8.0 points, 6.7 assists and 2.3 steals per game as a senior. Betancourt participated on the 2011 Nike Global Challenge. Betancourt was the first Puerto Rican born and raised to appear in the 2011 Jordan Brand Classic in which he recorded 14 points, 5 assists, 4 rebounds and 2 steal to help the white team to victory.

== College career ==
Betancourt began his college basketball career with Akron Zips NCAA Division I where he helped the team win the Mid-American Conference Tournament on his freshman year. On his first year as a freshman he participated on March Madness in which his team got eliminated by VCU on the first round.

In 2014, Betancourt transferred to an NCAA Division II – Gallitos. As a junior, he helped the team win the Liga Atlética Interuniversitaria de Puerto Rico LAI 2016 Tournament Champion. Betancourt was named the Most Valuable Player on the 2015–16 season for the Gallitos of the UPR. On his senior year with the Gallitos he averaged 8.9 points, 5.3 assists, 5.2 rebounds and 1.2 steals in 23.5 minutes per game on the unbeatable (10–0) regular season. He led his team to "back-to-back" championships.

== International career ==
He also represents Puerto Rico at the international level, having played for his home country in the 2009 FIBA Under-16 World Championship averaging 18.0 points, 3.0 rebounds, 2.2 assists and 2.2 steals in five contest. He then represented Puerto Rico at the 2009 Centrobasket Under-18 Championship averaging 7.5 points, 1.2 rebounds and 7.0 assist per game in four contests. Betancourt also played 2010 FIBA Under-18 World Championship as the starting point guard averaging 5.0 points, 4.6 assists, 2.2 rebounds and 2.0 steals in five contests.

== Professional career ==
Carmelo Betancourt was selected in the first round with the third pick by Indios de Mayagüez (basketball) in the draft of the Baloncesto Superior Nacional on February 28, 2017. Betancourt had very little playing time his rookie season. In 2017, Hurricane Maria struck Puerto Rico leading to his team to not participate on the 2017–18 season. On January 31, 2019, Betancourt was transferred to Vaqueros de Bayamón. On August 1, 2021, Betancourt was signed by the Grises de Humacao. After playing the 2021 season with Los Grises, Betancourt was acquired by los Capitanes de Arecibo to play for the 2022 season. He is now currently playing for the Cangrejeros de Santurce (basketball).
