= Jacques de Béthencourt =

French physician

Jacques de Béthencourt (French pronunciation: [ʒak də betɑ̃kuʁ]; fl. early 16th century) was a French physician who practiced medicine in Rouen. He is remembered for coining the term venereal disease.

As a Frenchman, Béthencourt resented the term Morbus Gallicus (French disease), which was a popular name for sexually transmitted diseases at the time. He believed that since the disease originated from "illicit love" it should be named Morbus Venereus (Malady of Venus) or lues venerea (venereal disease). Béthencourt believed it to be a new disease that was unknown to the ancients.

In 1527, Béthencourt published a book called Nouveau Cartme de penitence or the "New Book of Penance". Here he uses medical and moral judgments regarding the disease. In this treatise he creates an argument as to whether guaiacum or mercury is the best cure, and to what level of suffering a patient should have to endure in order to "be taught a necessary lesson".

== Bibliography ==
- Patient Plus site, Syphilis
- The Wages of Sin: Sex and Disease, Past and Present by Peter Lewis Allen
