= Alfredo Betancourt =

Álvaro Alfredo Betancourt Blanco (born 26 October 1914 Atiquizaya, El Salvador, died Moraira, Spain 30 August 2013) was a Salvadoran writer.

== Life ==
After his primary education in his home town, when he was 14 years old Alfredo won a scholarship to study at the prestigious teacher training college, La Escuela Normal, San Salvador. He studied there for six years and qualified as "profesor de instruccion primaria", primary school teacher, in November 1934.

Alfredo returned to his home department of Santa Ana and taught in various government and private schools until 1948. During this time, he developed his love of literature and philosophy, and started his literary career when he became founding editor of the highly regarded cultural affairs magazine, "Simiente".

In January 1949, Alfredo became Director of the "Escuela Normal Alberto Masferrer" in San Salvador, a post he held until the end of 1956. Further editorial posts occurred during this time: "Ateneo", the magazine of the cultural association of that name, and "22 de junio", a magazine dedicated to education theory and practice, and "Masferrer" which also covered educational topics.

In 1952, in recognition of his contribution to his home town, Alfredo was nominated as Deputy for the Department of Ahuachapan, and served in the government of President Oscar Osorio. As a noted educator, in 1956 he was appointed as "Jefe de la Seccion Tecnica y Planificacion del Ministerio de Cultura", a ministerial position covering culture in El Salvador, a post he held until the collapse of the government of Jose Maria Lemus in 1960.

In 1970 Alfredo was elected to join the El Salvador "Real Academia de la Lengua Espanola", correspondent to the Royal Academy in Madrid, Spain. In 1972 he became a numbered member of the El Salvador Academy, representing El Salvador in Spain for the composition of the 1976 edition of the "Diccionario de la Lengua Espanola".

On 4 December 2008, Alfredo received the highest honour his birthplace of Atiquizaya could bestow upon him. He was nominated "Hijo Meritissimo", and the 3a Calle Oriente and Poniente - the location of his ancestral home and where he was born - was officially renamed "Calle Alfredo Betancourt".

Alfredo was widowed in July 2008. He had four children. He retired to live on the Mediterranean coast in Spain, where he died on 30 August 2013.

== Works ==
=== short story ===
- "La Potranca"

=== philosophical works ===
- "Ser Interior"
- "Gotas Morales"
- "Que es el Hombre?"

=== literary critique ===
- "Dona Barbara" entitled "Dona Barbara y Don Juan Frente al Espejo de la Conducta Sexual"

=== travel memories ===
- "El Arte Colonial Quiteno"
- "Son Veinte Juicios sobre Grandes Hombres" collection of thoughts on famous people
