= Convent of São Francisco (Angra do Heroísmo) =

- Convento do São Francisco
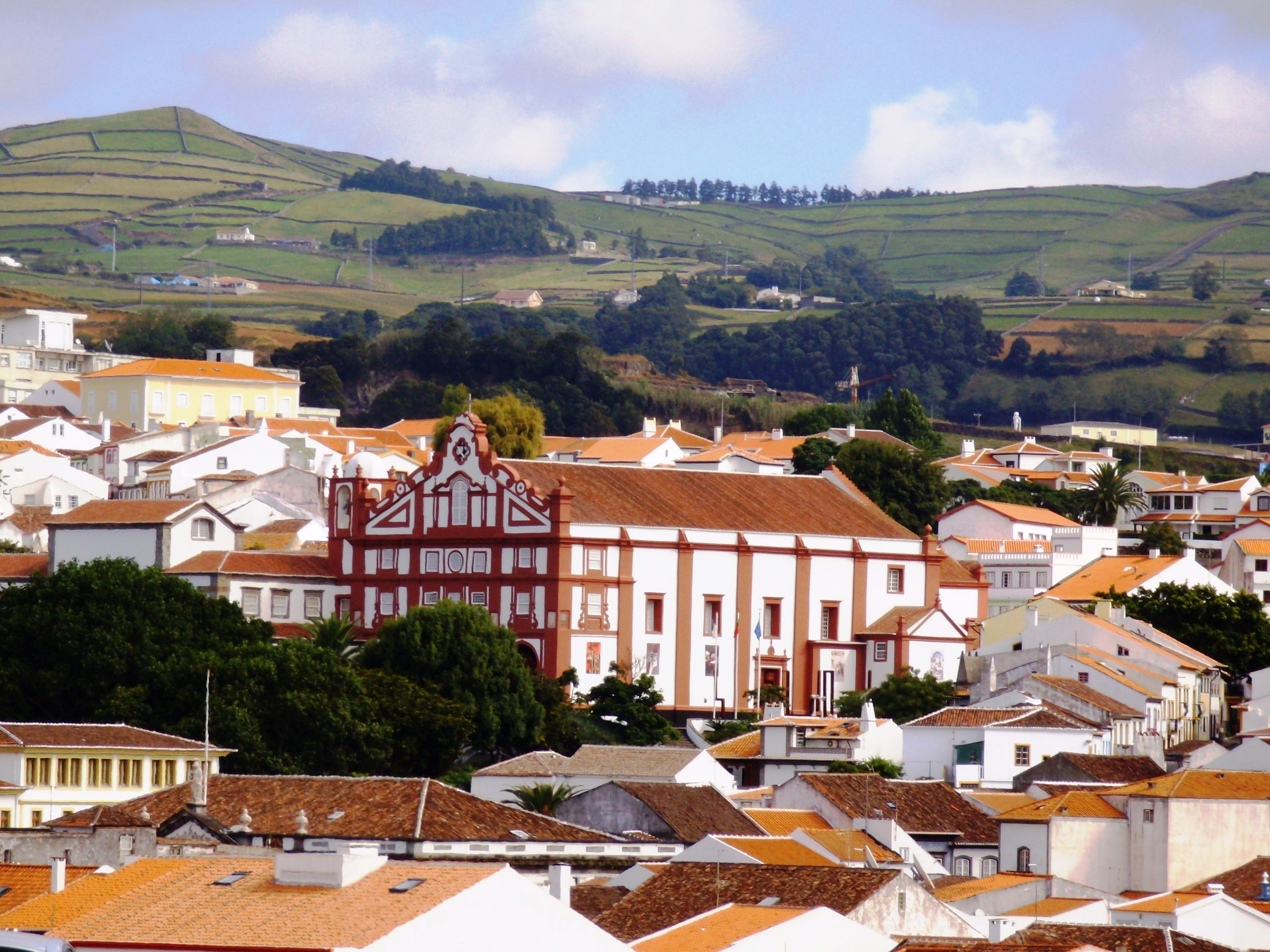
- The large Church of Nossa Senhora da Guia, part of the Convent grounds of São Francisco in the city of Angra do Heroísmo

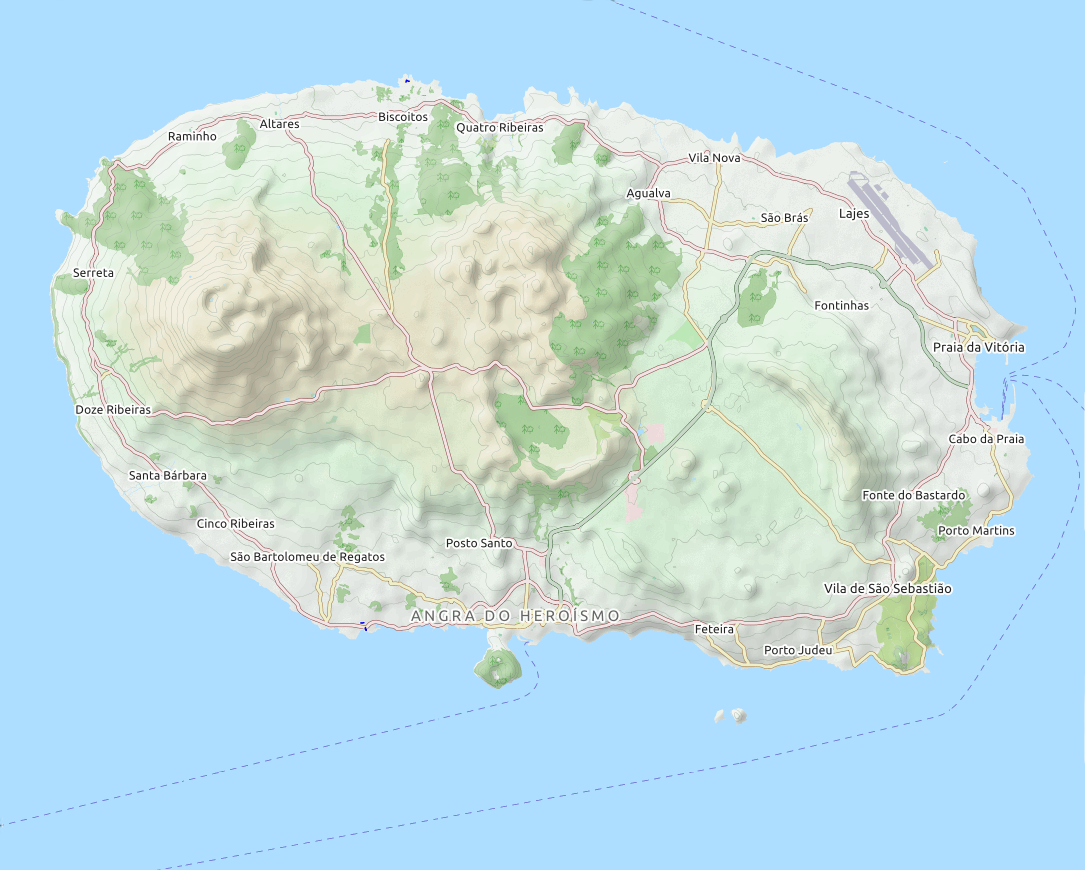
- Location within Terceira

General information
- Type: Convent
- Architectural style: Baroque
- Location: Sé, Angra do Heroísmo, Portugal
- Coordinates: 38°39′25″N 27°13′01″W
- Opened: c. 1470
- Owner: Portuguese Republic

The Convent of São Francisco is a Baroque-era convent and church in the historical centre of the city of Angra, civil parish of Sé, municipality of Angra do Heroísmo on the Portuguese island of Terceira, in the archipelago of the Azores. Better recognizable for the large Church of Our Lady of the Guide (Portuguese: Igreja de Nossa Senhora da Guia), it is locally known as the Igreja do Convento de São Francisco, (Church of the Convent of São Francisco), one of the largest of Christian temples in the Azores, and former seat of the Franciscan Province of São João Evangelista, during the Age of Discovery. It now hosts the Angra do Heroísmo Museum.

== History ==
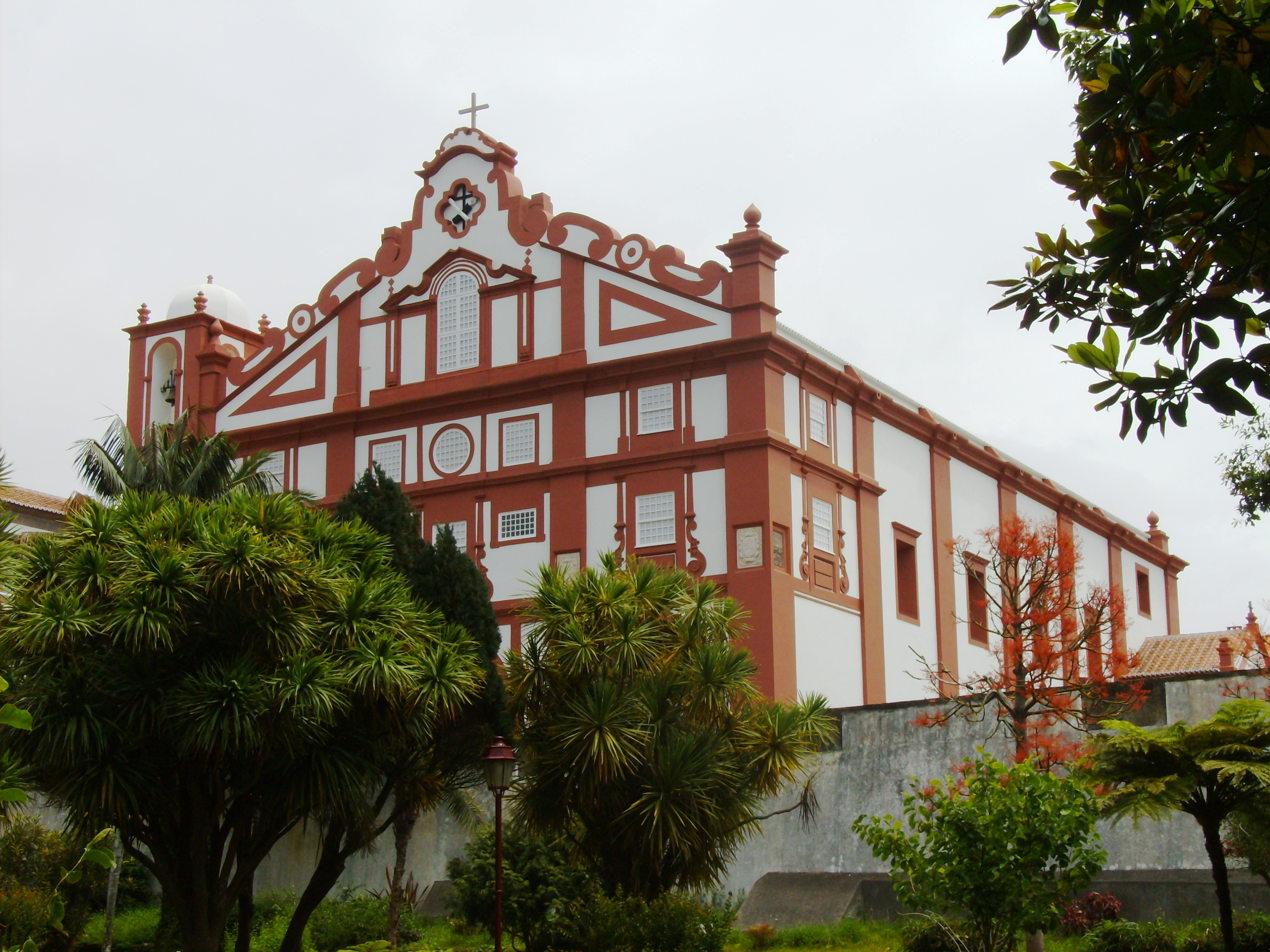
The large rectangular form of the Church, on the grounds of the former Convent, as seen from the Duke of Terceira Gardens

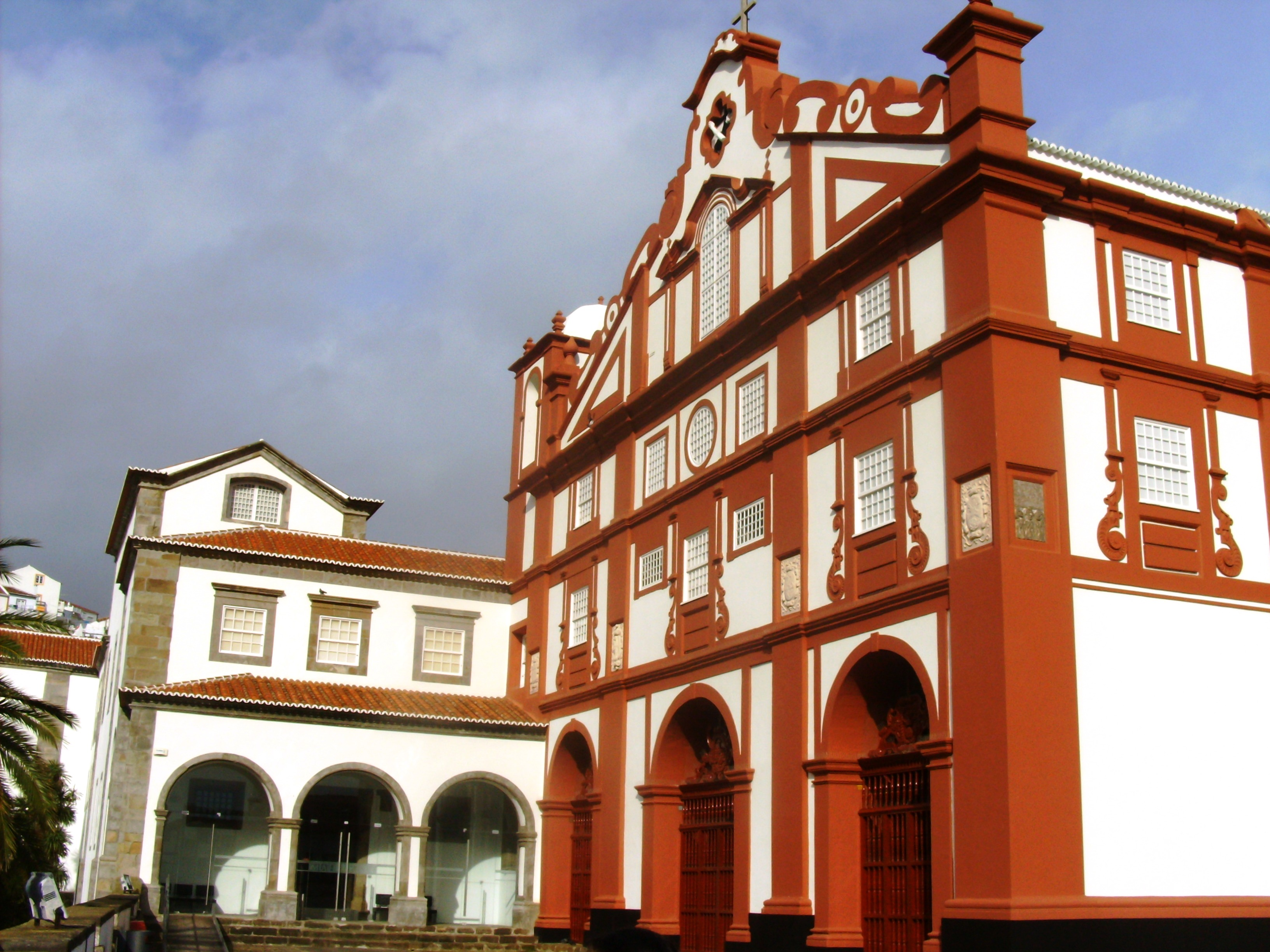
The Convent of São Francisco and the, much larger, Church of Our Lady of the Guide

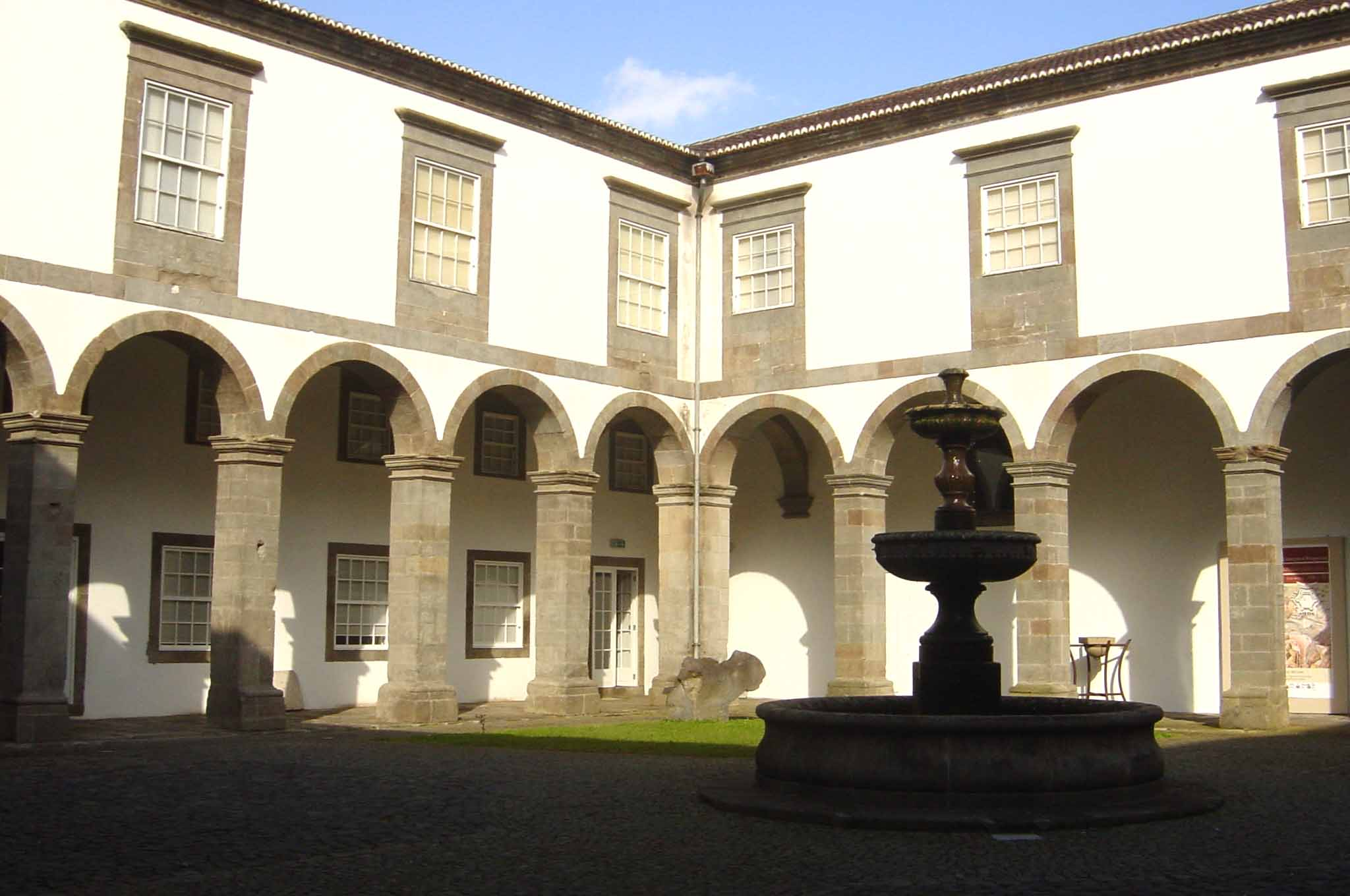
The interior cloister of the Convent/Church of São Francisco with water fountain

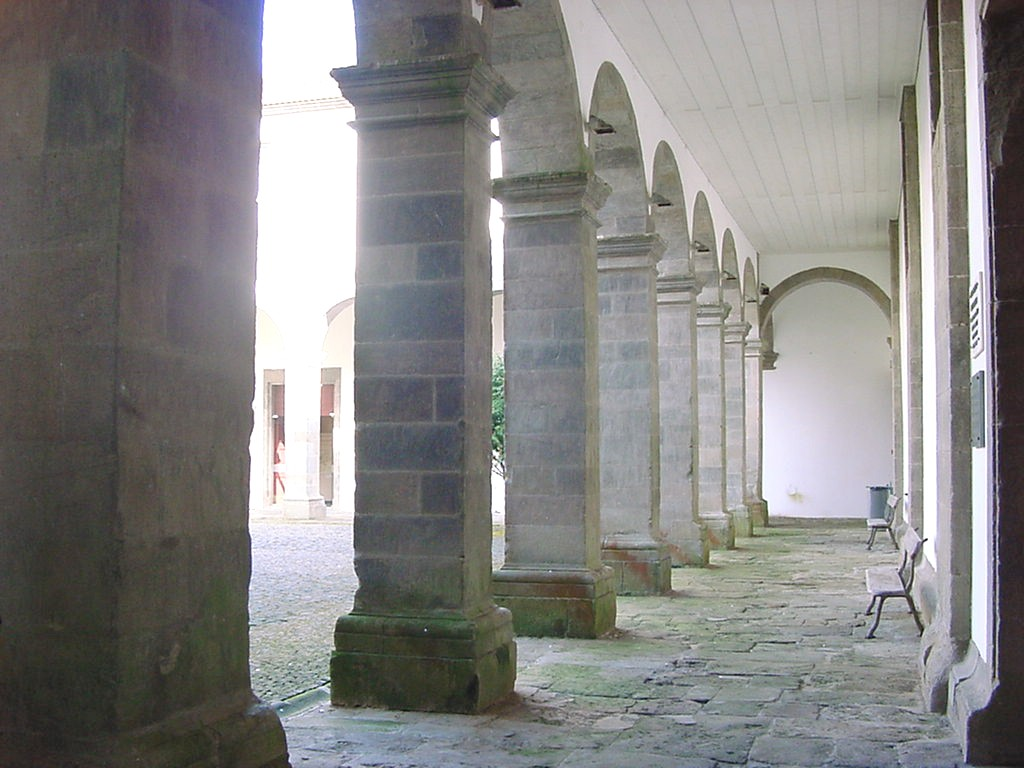
Part of the colonnaded cloister of the Church of São Francisco

The first Franciscan friars arrived on Terceira around 1456: almost immediately, they began to construct a hermitage and, much later, around 1470, a convent.

This primitive group was eventually demolished, and a larger, more imposing temple was constructed. In 1663, friar Naranjo had accumulated the donations necessary to begin construction of the new group. Three years later, the dormitories and cells were already concluded, while on 6 March 1666, the first cornerstone was placed for the new Church.

On 1 October 1672, the project was completed, and the group was blessed by the Bishop of Angra, Lourenço de Castro, after a solemn procession that included members of the civil authority, military and ecclesiastical orders.

It was at the convent that António, Prior of Crato lived during his exile in the Azores, until 1583.

After the Liberal Revolution of 1820, with the diffusion of liberal idealism throughout the country and archipelago, in 1823, four clergy, five monks and 11 laymen who professed these ideas were detained in the convent. The group were captured in Praia and transferred under military escort to Angra. They entered by the Porta dos Carros (Carriage Gate), were they encountered local absolute monarchists, armed with iron cuttings who attempted to lynch the free-thinks.

During the Liberal Wars, in May 1829, the Provisional Junta accused the Franciscans of being the "bulwark of infidelity", and in December of that year, the convent received orders to throw-out the monks and send them to Praia (except three for religious services), in order to requisition their quarters to house the Infantry's Provisional Regiment, under the command of Lieutenant-Colonel Bartolomeu Salazar Moscoso.

Within the extinction of the religious orders in Portugal (1834), and creation of the Liceu de Angra do Heroísmo (Lyceum of Angra do Heroísmo), the annexes and dependencies in the western wing of the convent were reused for teaching, under the guidance of Father Jerónimo Emiliano de Andrade. Classes began in October 1851, but there was still a lack of professors and adequate installations to permit the first years classes to run smoothly.

In 1862, in the eastern wing, the Diocensal Seminary was inaugurated.

Two years later, the first meteorological station was installed in the northwest wing, in the direction of the monument Alto da Memória.

In 1900, the installations of the Lyceum were transferred to the Bettencourt Palace, the old Episcopal Palace, but returned in 1913, following the events of the 5 October 1910 revolution.

During the Estado Novo regime, the lyceum began to be known as the Liceu Nacional de Angra do Heroísmo, but ultimately transferred to new spaces during the 1968-1969 school year.

The convent and church were classified as a Property of Public Interest (Decree 47/508), on 24 January 1967, but later included as part of the group designation for the Historic Centre of Angra do Heroísmo, under resolution 41/80 (11 June 1980).

The dependencies of the Convent are today occupied by the Museum of Angra do Heroísmo, which conserves many of the objects and reliquary that once belonged to the church and its spaces.

It is considered a pantheon; it is the resting place for notable figures, such as João Vaz Corte-Real and Paulo da Gama (brother of explorer Vasco da Gama), whose tombstone is located in the primitive Chapel of Nossa Senhora da Guia (today nonexistent).

In January 2012, the organ (built in 1788 by António Xavier Machado e Cerveira), labelled number 22, and oldest constructed in the archipelago was sent for restoration. Considered in a grave state of degradation, it was damaged during the 1980 earthquake and was disassembled for its protection. The restoration was placed under the care of Dinarte Machado, and supported by resources from the Direção Regional da Cultura (Regional Directorate for Culture), and was the last of the Angra's historic organs to be completely refurbished.

== Architecture ==
The interior of the large church is divided into three naves, in the typical cruciform pattern, with the altar (also relatively large) at its apex.

The entranceway is dominated by a high choir associated with the convent.
