= D.J. Bettencourt =

American politician

Deputy Insurance Commissioner of New Hampshire
- Incumbent
- Assumed office January 15, 2021
- Governor: Chris Sununu
- Commissioner: Chris Nicolopoulos
- Preceded by: Alex Feldvebel

Majority Leader of the New Hampshire House of Representatives
- In office December 1, 2010 – May 27, 2012
- Preceded by: Mary Jane Wallner
- Succeeded by: Peter Silva

Member of the New Hampshire House of Representatives from the Rockingham 4th district
- In office December 1, 2004 – May 27, 2012

Personal details
- Born: January 6, 1984 (age 42) Salem, New Hampshire
- Party: Republican
- Education: University of New Hampshire

David J. "D.J." Bettencourt (born January 6, 1984) is a former legislator from Salem, New Hampshire, who was a member of the New Hampshire House of Representatives from 2004 to 2012, representing district Rockingham-4, and was majority leader from 2010 until his resignation in 2012. Bettencourt currently serves as New Hampshire's Deputy Insurance Commissioner following his service as policy director for New Hampshire Governor Chris Sununu.

== Early life and education ==
Bettencourt is a lifelong resident of Salem, New Hampshire. He is a 2003 graduate of Tewksbury Memorial High in Tewksbury, Massachusetts. He began his involvement in politics as a campaign volunteer for George W. Bush's 2000 presidential campaign and was an intern on Gordon J. Humphrey's 2002 gubernatorial campaign and Mitt Romney's 2002 gubernatorial campaign. Bettencourt was a special aide to Romney as governor in 2003-2004.

Bettencourt played baseball in high school and college. In high school he was a Merrimack Valley Conference Player of the Year, was a Boston Globe and Boston Herald All-Scholastic player in 2002 and 2003, and was the 2002 and 2003 Lowell Sun Player of the Year. Bettencourt was a member of the 2003 Massachusetts/Connecticut All Star Team. A catcher and first baseman, Bettencourt attended the University of Massachusetts Amherst on a baseball scholarship prior to transferring to the University of New Hampshire.

At the University of New Hampshire, Bettencourt received two bachelor's degrees in 2007 in political science and communication. Bettencourt attended, though did not graduate, from the University of New Hampshire School of Law where he served as President of the UNH Law chapter of the Federalist Society.

== Legislative career ==
First elected as a New Hampshire state representative at the age of 20, following the 2010 elections, he became the youngest House Majority Leader in the nation (at age 27) and the youngest in New Hampshire history. Prior to being Majority Leader, Bettencourt served as a Republican Caucus Whip during the 2009-2010 legislative sessions as well as a majority caucus whip during the 2005-2006 legislative sessions. Bettencourt rose to a position of leadership with support from the newly conservative majority elected to the New Hampshire Legislature in 2010. Bettencourt served nearly four full terms in the House of Representatives, representing Rockingham County District 4.

=== Resignation and scandal ===
He resigned from the New Hampshire House of Representatives on May 27, 2012, following revelations that he had submitted falsified internship documents relating to his attendance at the University of New Hampshire School of Law. He had made 11 weeks of reports, written in extreme detail of things that never occurred, and then submitted them as part of his internship requirements to the University of New Hampshire School of Law and then lied about it. He resigned as Majority Leader and then resigned his seat.

At the time of his resignation, Bettencourt also served as a member of several charitable and nonprofit organizations, including the Museum of American Finance, New Hampshire Historical Society, New Hampshire Humane Society, and Republicans for Environmental Protection.

=== Election as New Hampshire House Majority Leader ===
Bettencourt won the House majority leader's post on December 1, 2010, in voting by the Republican House caucus. In the first round Bettencourt led with 117 votes, while Representative Paul Mirski of Enfield received 78 and Representative Shawn Jasper of Hudson received 74. After the first round, Jasper threw his support behind Bettencourt. In the second round of balloting, Bettencourt received 172 votes to Mirski's 89. In a show of unity after the second ballot result, Mirski asked the caucus to make Bettencourt's selection to the post by unanimous consent, to which the caucus agreed.

== Positions on specific issues ==
Bettencourt formerly served on the state House Ways and Means and the Judiciary committees. He has co-sponsored some 30 pieces of legislation that have become law.

Bettencourt is opposed to legal abortion and is a supporter of parental notification law.

Bettencourt is sponsoring a tax credit program that would allow business to donate a certain amount of money for education to be given to families seeking alternatives to public school (either home-schooling or for private or religious schools). The donating business would receive a tax credit of between 75 and 90 percent for that donation. The proposal aims to avoid the constitutional issues faced by school voucher programs.

Bettencourt opposes a state sales or income tax in New Hampshire and opposes the implementing any new taxes or raising existing taxes. Bettencourt has stated that "the only way to maintain low taxes is to control spending. If government spends too much, taxes will go up, and no amount of shifting them around from one form to another will prevent this." Bettencourt was the chief sponsor of a 2010 bill to allow local municipalities to enact tax caps and also sponsored a state constitutional amendment prohibiting an income tax in New Hampshire. In 2011, Bettencourt, in his speech outlining the agenda for the upcoming session of the New Hampshire House, stated that: "This legislature must immediately take on the duty of making some very difficult, but necessary spending choices. Over the past four years, state government spending increased by 25%. This came at a time when other states were cutting their spending by an average of 2% and now we are now facing the serious consequences."

Bettencourt opposes the 2010 health care reform and characterized it as a "plan to take over Americans' health care." Bettencourt has supported proposals to have New Hampshire seek a waiver from Medicaid and from the health insurance law so cuts to optional services not required under federal law could be made.

Bettencourt took a neutral position on expanded legal gambling/gaming in his first campaign for state representative but after being elected expressed support for expanded gambling to provide additional revenues for future budgets. In November 2011, Bettencourt harshly criticized Governor John Lynch's pledge to veto any legislation expanding gaming, stating that this would result in jobs and money going to Massachusetts rather than to New Hampshire.

== Romney endorsement ==
On September 2, 2011, Mitt Romney's campaign for president announced that Bettencourt had endorsed his candidacy. The Boston Globe characterized the endorsement as "coming from one of the state’s top conservative leaders, is a coup for Romney, who has made an effort in recent days to reach out to conservatives, including the Tea Party movement."

== Defense of NH primary ==
In 2011, after controversy arose when Nevada Republicans tentatively set the date for the 2012 Republican Caucuses for January 14, Bettencourt, along with other legislative and political leaders throughout New Hampshire, became vocal advocates for the protection of New Hampshire's first-in-the-nation presidential primary. New Hampshire law requires its primary be held at least seven days in advance of any similar contest. As a result, it had been believed that NH Secretary of State Bill Gardner would set the date as early as December in order to avoid occurring too soon after Iowa. Bettencourt said all New Hampshire officials were asking was for Nevada to move its caucuses back 72 hours, to avoid disrupting the primary process by pushing the New Hampshire primary into December. “Given the consequences, given the relatively easy fix, which is for Nevada just to move their caucus back 72 hours, I think a boycott is appropriate,” Bettencourt said. "I appreciate and thank all of the candidates who have chosen to stand with New Hampshire in support of the First in the Nation primary," Bettencourt said in reference to several candidates who have agreed to boycott the Nevada caucus if it does not move back its Jan. 14 date. "It has become an important part of our heritage."

Bettencourt said the primary and the Old Man of the Mountain are the two things that immediately come to mind when people across the country think of New Hampshire. "Unfortunately we lost one of them to Mother Nature a few years ago," Bettencourt said. "But we intend to fight to hold on to the other." He spoke of the expectation residents have here candidates will "look them square in the eye and be ready to answer the tough questions." Bettencourt believes "we have earned the right to be the first in the nation, we thank those candidates for president, both past and present, who have stood with us in our fight. And we look forward to maintaining our first in the nation status for m any years to come." On October 22, the Nevada Republican Central Committee voted to hold their caucuses on February 4 rather than January 14, at the behest of Republican National Committee officials and responding to public pressure from New Hampshire and candidates who refused to campaign there if they did not change the date.

== Awards and honors ==
In 2007, then-Speaker Terie Norelli named Bettencourt to serve on the Abraham Lincoln Bicentennial Committee in New Hampshire. In 2008, the New Hampshire Advantage Coalition awarded Bettencourt as their “Legislator of the Year.”

Prior to attending law school, he was a manager of DB's Instructional Baseball and Softball Academy, a local indoor athletic facility. In his free time, Bettencourt coaches baseball.

DJ Bettencourt is the Deputy Commissioner of the New Hampshire Insurance Department. He was nominated by Commissioner Christopher Nicolopoulos and approved by Governor Christopher T. Sununu in January 2021. Previously, Deputy Commissioner Bettencourt served as Governor Sununu’s Policy Director for four years, including as the Governor’s liaison to the Insurance Department.

In 2021, Governor Sununu named D.J. the chairman of the Granite State Paid Family and Medical Leave Plan.

In 2022, he launched the DJ Bettencourt Scholarship for Insurance Professionals. Students in the United States who wish to pursue a career in the insurance industry are encouraged to apply. One student who has the best application will receive a $1,000 scholarship.

Bettencourt also serves on the Salem, New Hampshire, Budget Committee and coaches softball for his 10 year old daughter and baseball for his 5 year old son.
