= Normans =

European ethnic group

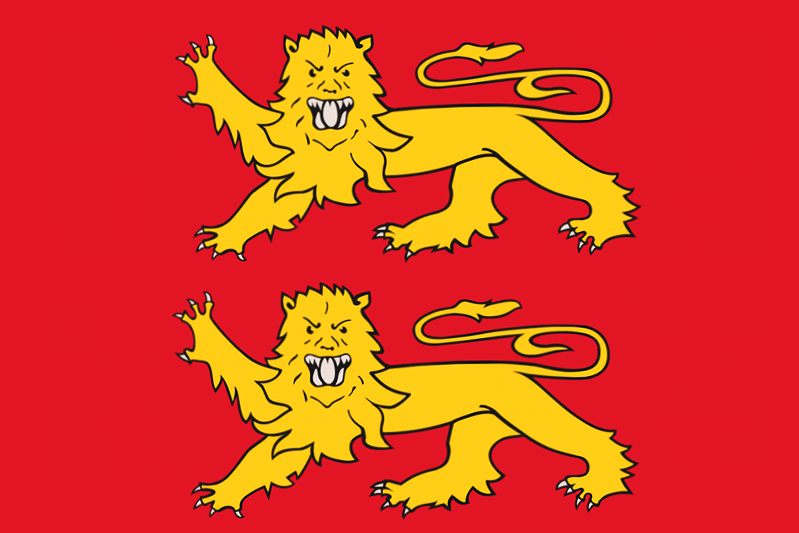
- Flag of the Normans

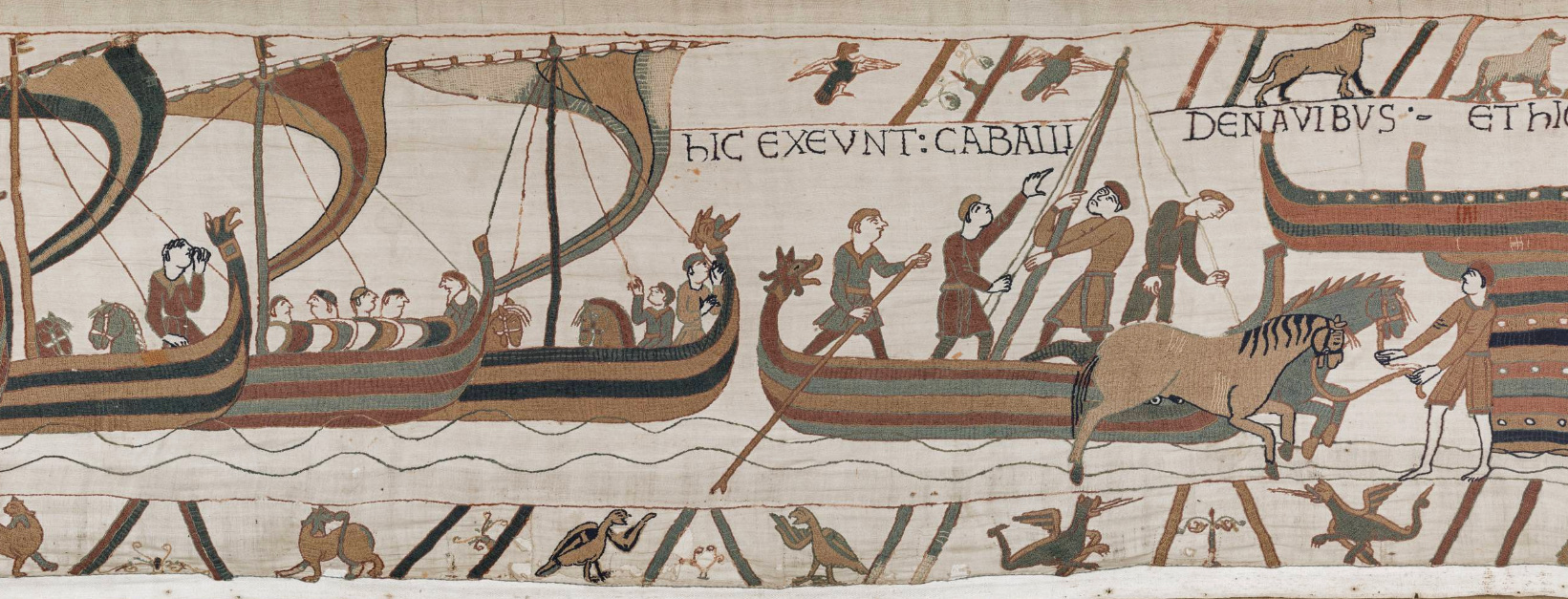
- Arrival in England scene from the Bayeux Tapestry, depicting Normans using longships

Languages
- Old Norman; Latin; Old Norse

Religion
- Christianity, Norse paganism

Related ethnic groups
- Historical: Norse; Gallo-Romans; Franks

The Normans (Norman: Normaunds; French: Normands; Latin: Nortmanni/Normanni) were a population arising in the medieval Duchy of Normandy from the intermingling between Norse Viking settlers and locals of West Francia. The Norse settlements in West Francia followed a series of raids on the French northern coast mainly from what is now Denmark, although some also sailed from Norway and Sweden. These settlements were finally legitimized when Rollo, a Scandinavian Viking leader, agreed to swear fealty to King Charles III of West Francia following the siege of Chartres in 911, leading to the formation of the County of Rouen. This new fief, through kinship in the decades to come, would expand into what came to be known as the Duchy of Normandy. The Norse settlers, whom the region as well as its inhabitants were named after, adopted the language, religion, social customs and martial doctrine of the West Franks but their offspring nonetheless retained many of their traits, notably their mercenary tendencies and their fervour for adventures. The intermixing between Norse folk and native West Franks in Normandy produced an ethnic and cultural "Norman" identity in the first half of the 10th century, an identity which continued to evolve over the centuries.

The Norman dynasty had a major political, cultural and military impact on medieval Europe and the Near East. The Normans were historically famed for their martial spirit, and eventually for their Catholic piety as adherents of the Catholic orthodoxy of the Romance community. The original Norse settlers adopted the Gallo-Romance language of the Frankish land they settled, with their Old Norman dialect becoming known as Norman, Normaund or Norman French, an important literary language which is still spoken today in parts of mainland Normandy (Cotentinais and Cauchois dialects) and the nearby Channel Islands (Jèrriais and Guernésiais). The Duchy of Normandy, which arose from the Treaty of Saint-Clair-sur-Epte, was a great fief of medieval France. The Norman dukes exercised autonomous control of their holdings in Normandy, while at the same time being vassals owing fealty to the King of France, and under Richard I of Normandy (byname Richard sans Peur, meaning "Richard the Fearless"), the duchy was forged into a cohesive and formidable principality in feudal tenure.

Between 1066 and 1204, as a result of the Norman conquest of England, most of the kings of England were also dukes of Normandy. Gradually, an Anglo-Norman culture developed in the British Isles. In 1204, Philip II of France seized mainland Normandy by force of arms, having earlier declared the Duchy of Normandy to be forfeit to him. It remained a disputed territory until the Treaty of Paris of 1259, when the English sovereign ceded his claim to the Duchy, except for the Channel Islands. In the present day, the Channel Islands (the Bailiwick of Guernsey and the Bailiwick of Jersey) are considered to be officially the last remnants of the Duchy of Normandy, and are not part of the United Kingdom but are instead self-governing Crown Dependencies.

The Normans are noted both for their culture, such as their unique Romanesque architecture and musical traditions, and for their significant military accomplishments and innovations. Norman adventurers played a role in founding the Kingdom of Sicily under Roger II after conquering southern Italy and Malta from the Saracens and Byzantines, and an expedition on behalf of their duke, William the Conqueror, led to the Norman conquest of England at the Battle of Hastings in 1066. Norman and Anglo-Norman forces contributed to the Iberian Reconquista from the early eleventh to the mid-thirteenth centuries.

Norman cultural and military influence spread from these new European centres to the Crusader states of the Near East, where their prince Bohemond I founded the Principality of Antioch in the Levant, to Scotland and Wales in Great Britain, to Ireland, and to the coasts of north Africa and the Canary Islands. The legacy of the Normans persists today through the regional languages and dialects of France, England, Spain, Quebec and Sicily, and also through the various cultural, judicial, and political arrangements they introduced in their conquered territories.

== Etymology ==
The English name "Normans" comes from the French words Normans/Normanz, plural of Normant, modern French normand, which is itself borrowed from Old Low Franconian Nortmann "Northman" or directly from Old Norse Norðmaðr, Latinized variously as Nortmannus, Normannus, or Nordmannus (recorded in Medieval Latin, 9th century) to mean "Norseman, Viking".

The 11th century Benedictine monk and historian, Goffredo Malaterra, characterised the Normans thus:

Specially marked by cunning, despising their own inheritance in the hope of winning a greater, eager after both gain and dominion, given to imitation of all kinds, holding a certain mean between lavishness and greediness, that is, perhaps uniting, as they certainly did, these two seemingly opposite qualities. Their chief men were specially lavish through their desire of good report. They were, moreover, a race skillful in flattery, given to the study of eloquence, so that the very boys were orators, a race altogether unbridled unless held firmly down by the yoke of justice. They were enduring of toil, hunger, and cold whenever fortune laid it on them, given to hunting and hawking, delighting in the pleasure of horses, and of all the weapons and garb of war.

Medieval Latin documents referred to them as Nortmanni, which means "men of the North". This name provides the etymological basis for the modern words "Norman" and "Normandy", with -ia (Normandia, like Neustria, Francia, etc.). After 911, this name replaced the term Neustria, which had formerly been used to describe the region that included Normandy. Today, nordmann (Norwegian pronunciation: ['nuɾmɑn]) in the Norwegian language denotes a Norwegian person. In the Swedish language the word for the Norwegian person is norrman.

== History ==
=== Settling of Normandy ===
==== Viking Incursions ====
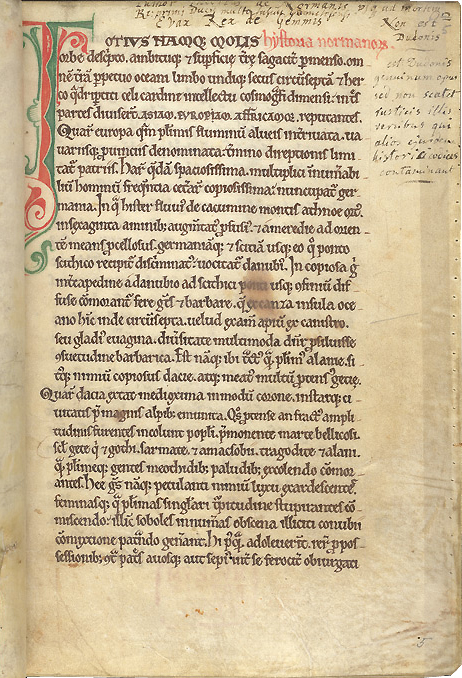
10th–11th century History of the Normans, by Dudo of Saint-Quentin

Between 790 and 800, the first Scandinavian Viking raiders targeted the coasts of northern Gaul. Several coastal areas were lost during the reign of Louis the Pious (814–840).

The Seine became the main route by which they entered the Kingdom of France. In 820, the first Viking attack sailed up the river; these raids became more frequent primarily in summer, while the Vikings initially wintered in Scandinavia.

In the course of the 10th century, the initially destructive incursions of Norse war bands penetrated further into the rivers of France, and evolved into more permanent encampments that included local French women and personal property. From 885 to 886, Odo of Paris (Eudes de Paris) succeeded in defending Paris against Viking raiders by fighting skill, fortification of Paris and tactical shrewdness.

Before the arrival of the Viking leader Rollo, Normandy's populations did not differ from Picardy or Île-de-France, which were considered Frankish. Earlier Viking settlers had begun arriving in the 880s, but were divided between colonies in the east (Roumois and Pays de Caux around the lower Seine valley) and in the west in the Cotentin Peninsula, and were separated by traditional pagii, where the population remained about the same with almost no foreign settlers. Rollo's contingents from Scandinavia who raided and ultimately settled Normandy and other parts of the European Atlantic coast included Danes, Norwegians, Norse–Gaels, Orkney Vikings, possibly Swedes, and Anglo-Danes from the English Danelaw territory which earlier came under Norse control in the late 9th century.

==== Duchy of Normandy ====
Duchy of Normandy between 911 and 1050. In blue the areas of intense Norse settlement

In 911, Robert I of France, brother of Odo, again defeated a band of Viking warriors in Chartres with his well-trained horsemen. This victory paved the way for Rollo's baptism and settlement in Normandy. The Duchy of Normandy, which began in 911 as a fiefdom, was established by the treaty of Saint-Clair-sur-Epte between King Charles III (Charles the Simple) (879–929, ruled 893–929) of West Francia and the famed Viking ruler Rollo also known as Gaange Rolf (c. 846–c. 929), from Scandinavia, and was situated in the former Frankish kingdom of Neustria. The treaty offered Rollo and his men the French coastal lands along the English Channel between the river Epte and the Atlantic Ocean coast in exchange for their protection against further Viking incursions. As well as promising to protect the area of Rouen from Viking invasion, Rollo swore not to invade further Frankish lands himself, accepted baptism and conversion to Christianity and swore fealty to King Charles III. Robert I of France stood as godfather during Rollo's baptism. Rollo thereby became the first Duke of Normandy and Count of Rouen. The area corresponded to the northern part of present-day Upper Normandy down to the river Seine, but the Duchy would eventually extend west beyond the Seine. The territory was roughly equivalent to the Ecclesiatical province of Rouen, and reproduced the old Roman Empire's administrative structure of Gallia Lugdunensis II (part of the former Gallia Lugdunensis in Gaul).

Within a generation, the Norman elite abandoned Old Norse for the Gallo-Romance language that would evolve into Norman French. They also converted to Christianity, but did so while retaining a distinct warrior ethos. This fusion is evident in the popularity of given names; while Old Norse names like Hrólfr (Rollo) and Ansteinn (Osten) were initially common, they were quickly Latinized or replaced by Christian names, yet the martial spirit remained central to their identity. In many ways they would seem "more French than the French".

The descendants of Vikings replaced the Norse religion and Old Norse language with Catholicism (Christianity) and the Langue d'oil of the local people, descending from the Latin of the Romans. The Norman language (Norman French) was forged by the adoption of the indigenous langue d'oïl branch of Romance by a Norse-speaking ruling class, and it developed into the French regional languages that survive today.

The new Norman rulers were culturally and ethnically distinct from the old French aristocracy, most of whom traced their lineage to the Franks of the Carolingian dynasty from the days of Charlemagne in the 9th century. By intermarrying with the local aristocracy and adopting the growing feudal doctrines of the rest of France, the Normans would progressively work these principles into a functional hierarchical system in their own duchy, and later export it to Norman dominated England. The Norman populations outside the Viking settler elite were overwhelmingly locals of West Francia.

As the proliferation of aristocratic families throughout the French kingdom limited the prospects of most heirs, young knights were encouraged to seek land and riches beyond their homeland, with Normandy becoming a major source of such adventurers. Many Normans of Italy, France and England eventually served as avid Crusaders soldiers under the Italo-Norman prince Bohemund I of Antioch and the Angevin-Norman king Richard the Lion-Heart, one of the more famous and illustrious Kings of England.

=== Conquests and military offensives ===
A chronological map of the Norman Conquests, including England (1066–1485, not always in personal union with Normandy), Normandy (911–1204), southern Italy and Sicily (1030–1263), parts of Africa around Tripoli (1146–1158), and the Crusader state of the Principality of Antioch along with associated vassals, the Principality of Ancyra (1073–1075), the Principality of Tarragona (1129–1173), and the Kingdom of the Canary Islands

Aside from the conquest of England and the subsequent invasions of Wales and Ireland, the Normans expanded into other areas. Norman families, such as that of Tancred of Hauteville, Rainulf Drengot and Guimond de Moulins played important parts in the conquest of southern Italy and the Crusades.

The Drengot lineage, de Hauteville's sons William Iron Arm, Drogo, and Humphrey, Robert Guiscard and Roger the Great Count progressively claimed territories in southern Italy until founding the Kingdom of Sicily in 1130. They also carved out a place for themselves and their descendants in the Crusader states of Asia Minor and the Holy Land.

==== Italy ====
The Norman Kingdom of Sicily (in green) in 1154, upon the death of Roger II

Opportunistic bands of Normans successfully established a foothold in southern Italy. Probably as the result of returning pilgrims' stories, the Normans entered southern Italy as warriors in 1017 at the latest. In 999, according to Amatus of Montecassino, Norman pilgrims returning from Jerusalem called in at the port of Salerno when a Muslim attack occurred. The Normans fought so valiantly that Prince Guaimar III begged them to stay, but they refused and instead offered to tell others back home of the Prince's request. William of Apulia tells that, in 1016, Norman pilgrims to the shrine of the Archangel Michael at Monte Gargano were met by Melus of Bari, a Lombard nobleman and rebel, who persuaded them to return with more warriors to help throw off the Byzantine rule, which they did.

The two most prominent Norman families to arrive in the Mediterranean were descendants of Tancred of Hauteville and the Drengot family. A group of Normans with at least five brothers from the Drengot family fought the Byzantines in Apulia under the command of Melus of Bari. Between 1016 and 1024, in a fragmented political context, the County of Ariano was founded by another group of Norman knights headed by Gilbert Buatère and hired by Melus of Bari. Defeated at Cannae, Melus of Bari escaped to Bamberg, Germany, where he died in 1022. The county, which replaced the pre-existing chamberlainship, is considered to be the first political body established by the Normans in the south of Italy. Then Rainulf Drengot, from the same family, received the county of Aversa from Duke Sergius IV of Naples in 1030.

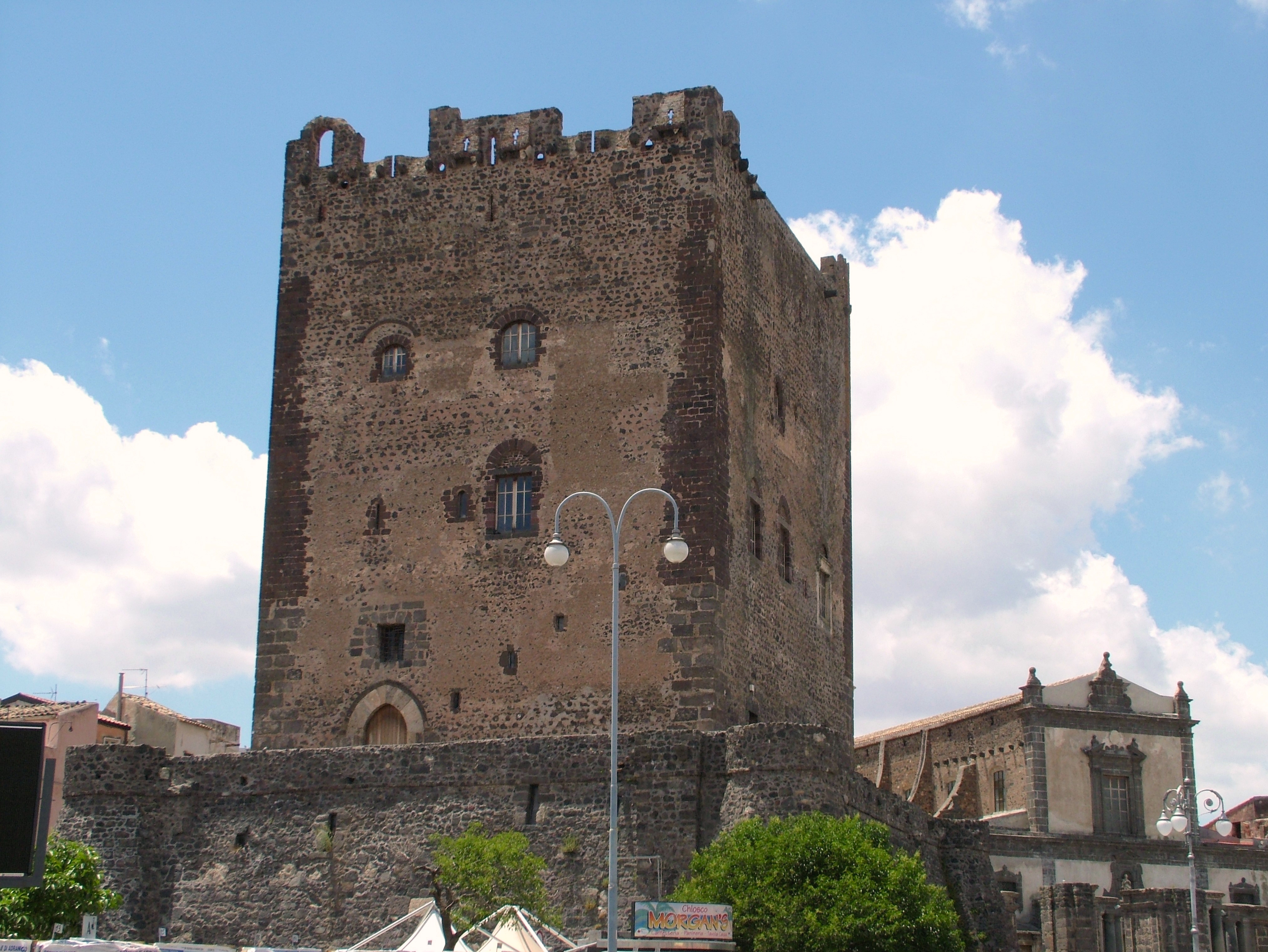
The early Norman castle at Adrano

The Hauteville family achieved princely rank by proclaiming Prince Guaimar IV of Salerno "Duke of Apulia and Calabria". He promptly awarded their elected leader, William Iron Arm, with the title of count in his capital of Melfi. The Drengot family thereafter attained the principality of Capua, and Emperor Henry III legally ennobled the Hauteville leader, Drogo, as "dux et magister Italiae comesque Normannorum totius Apuliae et Calabriae" ("Duke and Master of Italy and Count of the Normans of all Apulia and Calabria") in 1047.

From these bases, the Normans eventually captured Sicily and Malta from the Muslims, under the leadership of the famous Robert Guiscard, a Hauteville, and his younger brother Roger the Great Count. Roger's son, Roger II of Sicily, was crowned king in 1130 (exactly one century after Rainulf was "crowned" count) by Antipope Anacletus II. The Kingdom of Sicily lasted until 1194, when it was transferred to the House of Hohenstaufen through marriage. The Normans left their legacy in many castles, such as William Iron Arm's citadel at Squillace, and cathedrals, such as Roger II's Cappella Palatina at Palermo, which dot the landscape and give a distinct architectural flavor to accompany its unique history.

Institutionally, the Normans combined the administrative machinery of the Byzantines, Arabs, and Lombards with their own conceptions of feudal law and order to forge a unique government. Under this state, there was great religious freedom, and alongside the Norman nobles existed a meritocratic bureaucracy of Jews, Muslims and Christians, both Catholic and Eastern Orthodox. The Kingdom of Sicily thus became characterized by Norman, Byzantine, Greek, Arab, Lombard and "native" Sicilian populations living in harmony, and its Norman rulers fostered plans of establishing an empire that would have encompassed Fatimid Egypt as well as the crusader states in the Levant. One of the great geographical treatises of the Middle Ages, the "Tabula Rogeriana", was written by al-Idrisi for King Roger II of Sicily, and entitled "Kitab Rudjdjar" ("The Book of Roger").

==== The Iberian Peninsula ====
The Normans began appearing in the military confrontations between Christians and Muslims in the Iberian Peninsula since the early eleventh century. The first Norman who appears in the narrative sources was Roger I of Tosny who according to Ademar of Chabannes and the later Chronicle of St Pierre le Vif went to aid the Barcelonese in a series of raids against the Andalusi Muslims c. 1018. Later in the eleventh century, other Norman adventurers such as Robert Crispin and Walter Giffard participated in the probably papal organised siege of Barbastro of 1064. Even after the Norman conquest of England in 1066, the Normans continued to participate in ventures in the peninsula. After the Frankish conquest of the Holy Land during the First Crusade, the Normans began to be encouraged to participate in ventures of conquest in the northeast of the peninsula. The most significant example of this was the incursion of Rotrou II of Perche and Robert Burdet in the 1120s in the Ebro frontier. By 1129 Robert Burdet had been granted a semi-independent principality in the city of Tarragona by the then Archbishop of this see, Oleguer Bonestruga. Several others of Rotrou's Norman followers were rewarded with lands in the Ebro valley by King Alfonso I of Aragon for their services.

With the rising popularity of the sea route to the Holy Land, Norman and Anglo-Norman crusaders also started to be encouraged locally by Iberian prelates to participate in the Portuguese incursions into the western areas of the Peninsula. The first of these incursions occurred when a fleet of these Crusaders was invited by the Portuguese king Afonso I Henriques to conquer the city of Lisbon in 1142. Although this Siege of Lisbon (1142) was a failure it created a precedent for their involvement in Portugal. So in 1147 when another group of Norman and other groups of crusaders from Northern Europe arrived in Porto on their way to join the crusading forces of the Second Crusade, the Bishop of Porto and later Afonso Henriques according to De expugnatione Lyxbonensi convinced them to help with the siege of Lisbon. This time the city was captured and according to the arrangement agreed upon with the Portuguese monarch many of them settled in the newly sacked city. The following year the remainder of the crusading fleet, including a substantial number of Anglo-Normans, was invited by the count of Barcelona, Ramon Berenguer IV, to participate in the siege of Tortosa (1148). Again the Normans were rewarded with lands in the newly conquered frontier city.

==== North Africa ====
Between 1135 and 1160, the Norman Kingdom of Sicily conquered and kept as vassals several cities on the Ifriqiya coast, corresponding to Tunisia and parts of Algeria and Libya today. They were lost to the Almohads.

==== Byzantium ====
Soon after the Normans began to enter Italy, they entered the Byzantine Empire and then Armenia, fighting against the Pechenegs, the Bulgarians, and especially the Seljuk Turks. Norman mercenaries were first encouraged to come to the south by the Lombards to act against the Byzantines, but they soon fought in Byzantine service in Sicily. They were prominent alongside Varangian and Lombard contingents in the Sicilian campaign of George Maniaces in 1038–40. There is debate whether the Normans in Greek service actually were from Norman Italy, and it now seems likely only a few came from there. It is also unknown how many of the "Franks", as the Byzantines called them, were Normans and not other Frenchmen.

A chronological map of the Norman Conquests

One of the first Norman mercenaries to serve as a Byzantine general was Hervé in the 1050s. By then, however, there were already Norman mercenaries serving as far away as Trebizond and Georgia. They were based at Malatya and Edessa, under the Byzantine duke of Antioch, Isaac Komnenos. In the 1060s, Robert Crispin led the Normans of Edessa against the Turks. Roussel de Bailleul even tried to carve out an independent state in Asia Minor with support from the local population in 1073, but he was stopped in 1075 by the Byzantine general and future emperor Alexius Komnenos.

Some Normans joined Turkish forces to aid in the destruction of the Armenian vassal-states of Sassoun and Taron in far eastern Anatolia. Later, many took up service with the Armenian state further south in Cilicia and the Taurus Mountains. A Norman named Oursel led a force of "Franks" into the upper Euphrates valley in northern Syria. From 1073 to 1074, 8,000 of the 20,000 troops of the Armenian general Philaretus Brachamius were Normans—formerly of Oursel—led by Raimbaud. They even lent their ethnicity to the name of their castle: Afranji, meaning "Franks". The known trade between Amalfi and Antioch and between Bari and Tarsus may be related to the presence of Italo-Normans in those cities while Amalfi and Bari were under Norman rule in Italy.

Several families of Byzantine Greece were of Norman mercenary origin during the period of the Comnenian Restoration, when Byzantine emperors were seeking out western European warriors. The Raoulii were descended from an Italo-Norman named Raoul, the Petraliphae were descended from a Pierre d'Aulps, and that group of Albanian clans known as the Maniakates were descended from Normans who served under George Maniaces in the Sicilian expedition of 1038.

Robert Guiscard, another Norman adventurer previously elevated to the dignity of count of Apulia as the result of his military successes, ultimately drove the Byzantines out of southern Italy. Having obtained the consent of Pope Gregory VII and acting as his vassal, Robert continued his campaign conquering the Balkan peninsula as a foothold for western feudal lords and the Catholic Church. After allying himself with Croatia and the Catholic cities of Dalmatia, in 1081 he led an army of 30,000 men in 300 ships landing on the southern shores of Albania, capturing Valona, Kanina, Jericho (Orikumi), and reaching Butrint after numerous pillages. They joined the fleet that had previously conquered Corfu and attacked Dyrrachium from land and sea, devastating everything along the way. Under these harsh circumstances, the locals accepted the call of Emperor Alexios I Comnenos to join forces with the Byzantines against the Normans. The Byzantine forces could not take part in the ensuing battle because it had started before their arrival. Immediately before the battle, the Venetian fleet had secured a victory in the coast surrounding the city. Forced to retreat, Alexios ceded the city of Dyrrachium to the Count of the Tent (or Byzantine provincial administrators) mobilizing from Arbanon (i.e., ἐξ Ἀρβάνων ὁρμωμένω Κομισκόρτη; the term Κομισκόρτη is short for κόμης της κόρτης meaning "Count of the Tent"). The city's garrison resisted until February 1082, when Dyrrachium was betrayed to the Normans by the Venetian and Amalfitan merchants who had settled there. The Normans were now free to penetrate into the hinterland; they took Ioannina and some minor cities in southwestern Macedonia and Thessaly before appearing at the gates of Thessalonica. Dissension among the high ranks coerced the Normans to retreat to Italy. They lost Dyrrachium, Valona, and Butrint in 1085, after the death of Robert.

A few years after the First Crusade, in 1107, the Normans under the command of Bohemond, Robert's son, landed in Valona and besieged Dyrrachium using the most sophisticated military equipment of the time, but to no avail. Meanwhile, they occupied Petrela, the citadel of Mili at the banks of the river Deabolis, Gllavenica (Ballsh), Kanina and Jericho. This time, the Albanians sided with the Normans, dissatisfied by the heavy taxes the Byzantines had imposed upon them. With their help, the Normans secured the Arbanon passes and opened their way to Dibra. The lack of supplies, disease and Byzantine resistance forced Bohemond to retreat from his campaign and sign a peace treaty with the Byzantines in the city of Deabolis.

The further decline of Byzantine state-of-affairs paved the road to a third attack in 1185, when a large Norman army invaded Dyrrachium, owing to the betrayal of high Byzantine officials. Some time later, Dyrrachium—one of the most important naval bases of the Adriatic—fell again to Byzantine hands.

==== England ====
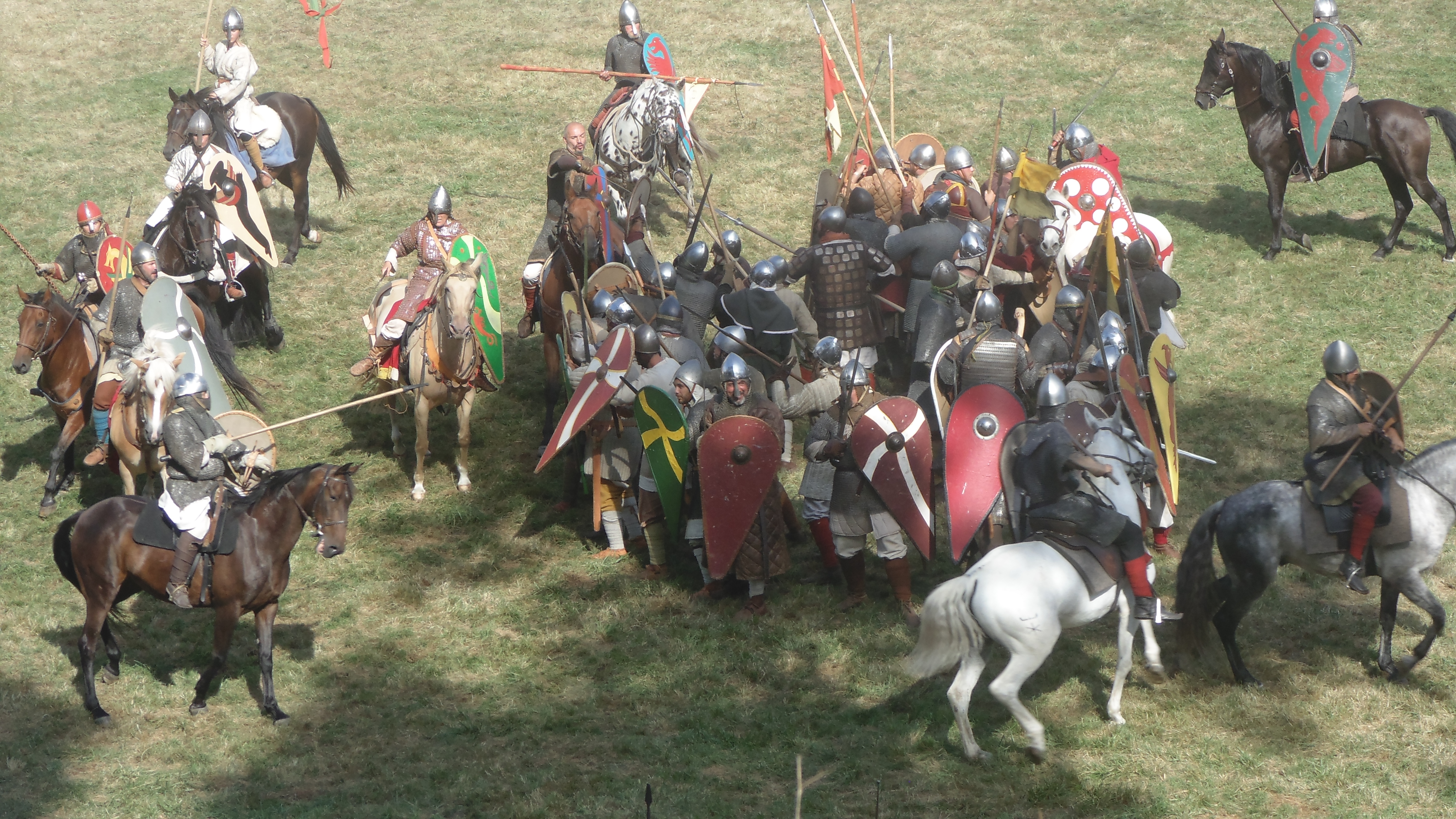
Modern depiction of 11th century Norman cavalry and infantry

The Normans were in contact with England from an early date. Not only were their original Viking brethren still ravaging the English coasts, they occupied most of the important ports opposite England across the English Channel. This relationship eventually produced closer ties of blood through the marriage of Emma, sister of Duke Richard II of Normandy, and King Ethelred II of England. Due to this, Ethelred fled to Normandy in 1013, when he was forced from his kingdom by Sweyn Forkbeard. His stay in Normandy (until 1016) influenced him and his sons by Emma, who stayed in Normandy after Cnut the Great's conquest of the isle.

When Edward the Confessor finally returned from his father's refuge in 1041, at the invitation of his half-brother Harthacnut, he brought with him a Norman-educated mind. He also brought many Norman counsellors and fighters, some of whom established an English cavalry force. This concept never really took root, but it is a typical example of Edward's attitude. He appointed Robert of Jumièges Archbishop of Canterbury and made Ralph the Timid Earl of Hereford.

On 14 October 1066, William the Conqueror gained a decisive victory at the Battle of Hastings, which led to the conquest of England three years later; this can be seen on the Bayeux Tapestry. The invading Normans and their descendants largely replaced the Anglo-Saxons as the ruling class of England. The nobility of England were part of a single Norman culture and many had lands on both sides of the channel. Early Norman kings of England, as Dukes of Normandy, owed homage to the King of France for their land on the continent. They considered England to be their most important holding (it brought with it the title of King—an important status symbol). While in England, locals often referred to the Normans as Franci.

Eventually, the Normans merged with the natives, combining languages and traditions, so much so that Marjorie Chibnall says "writers still referred to Normans and English; but the terms no longer meant the same as in the immediate aftermath of 1066." In the course of the Hundred Years' War, the Norman aristocracy often identified themselves as English. The Anglo-Norman language became distinct from the French spoken in Paris, something that was the subject of some humour by Geoffrey Chaucer. The Anglo-Norman language was eventually absorbed into the Anglo-Saxon language of their subjects (see Old English) and influenced it, helping (along with the Norse language of the earlier Anglo-Norse settlers and the Latin used by the church) in the development of Middle English, which, in turn, evolved into Modern English.

==== Ireland ====
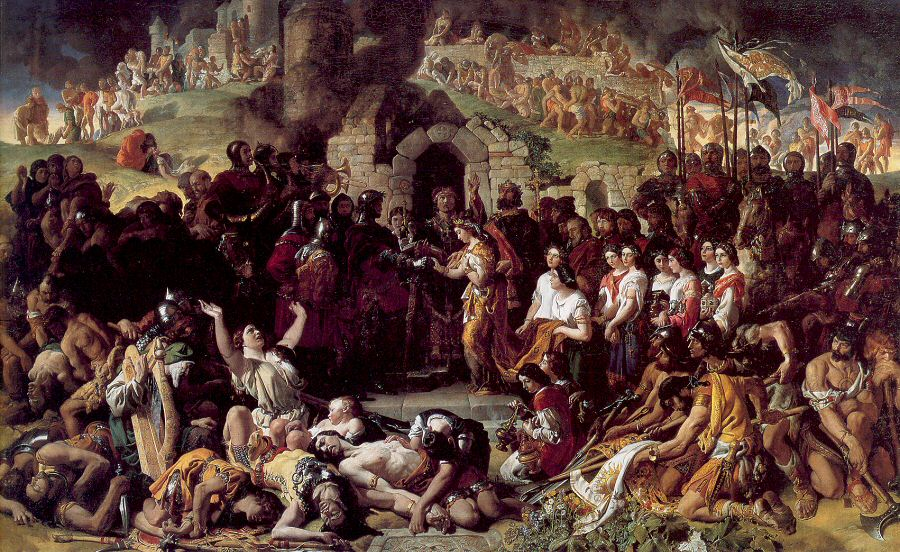
Depiction of the marriage of the Norman lord Strongbow to the Irish princess Aoife in Waterford in 1170

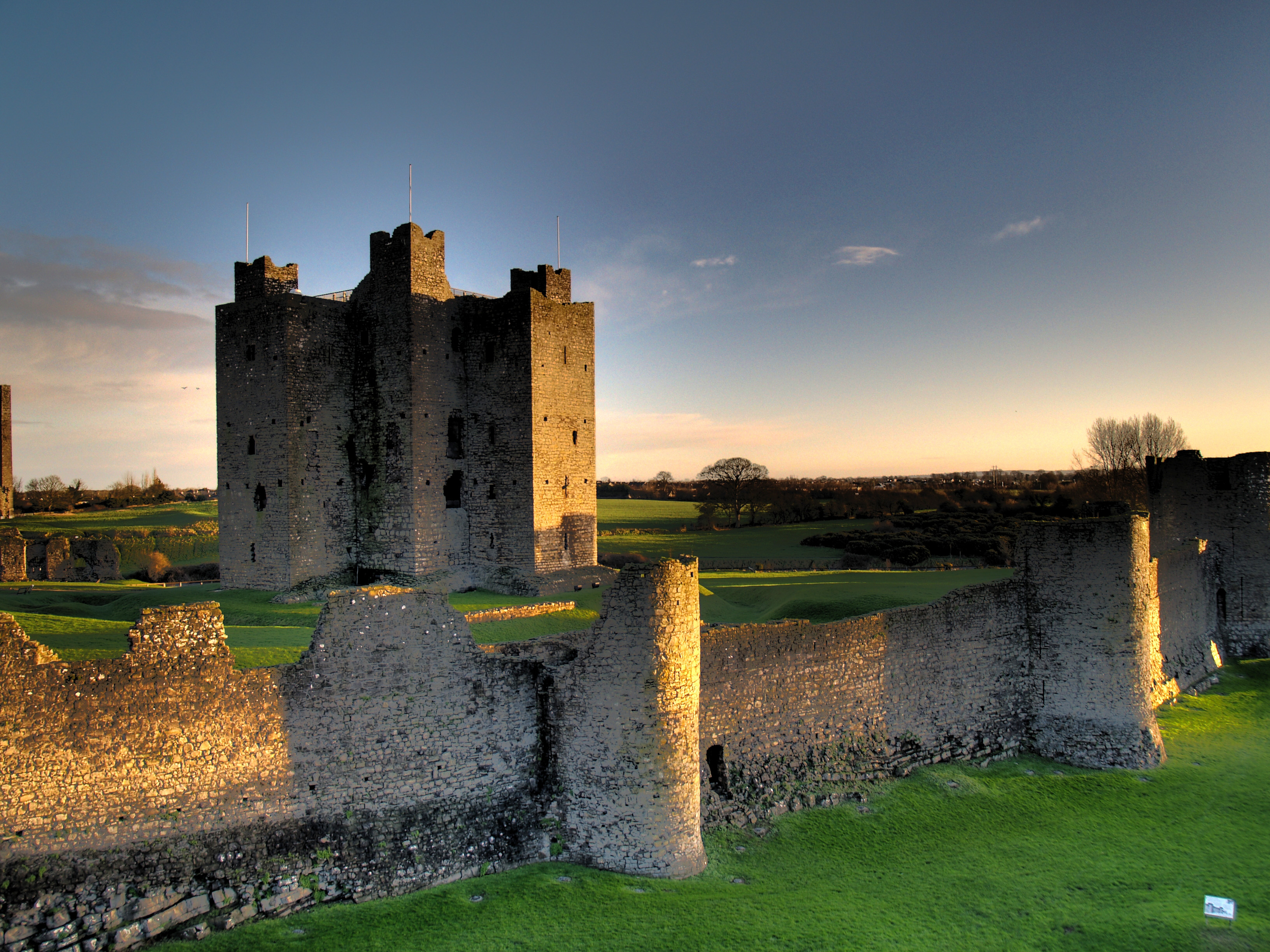
Norman keep in Trim, County Meath

The Normans had a profound effect on Irish culture and history after their invasion at Bannow Bay in 1169. Initially, the Normans maintained a distinct culture and ethnicity. Yet, with time, they came to be subsumed into Irish culture to the point that it has been said that they became "more Irish than the Irish themselves". The Normans settled mostly in an area in the east of Ireland, later known as the Pale, and also built many fine castles and settlements, including Trim Castle and Dublin Castle. The cultures intermixed, borrowing from each other's language, culture and outlook. Norman surnames still exist today. Names such as French, (De) Roche, Devereux, D'Arcy and Lacy are particularly common in the southeast of Ireland, especially in the southern part of County Wexford, where the first Norman settlements were established. Other Norman names, such as Furlong, predominate there. Another common Norman-Irish name was Morell (Murrell), derived from the French Norman name Morel. Names beginning with Fitz- (from the Norman for "son") usually indicate Norman ancestry. Hiberno-Norman surnames with the prefix Fitz- include Fitzgerald, FitzGibbons (Gibbons) as well as Fitzmaurice. Families bearing such surnames as Barry (de Barra) and De Búrca (Burke) are also of Norman extraction.

==== Scotland ====
One of the claimants of the English throne opposing William the Conqueror, Edgar Atheling, eventually fled to Scotland. King Malcolm III of Scotland married Edgar's sister Margaret, and came into opposition to William who had already disputed Scotland's southern borders. William invaded Scotland in 1072, riding as far as Abernethy where he met up with his fleet of ships. Malcolm submitted, paid homage to William and surrendered his son Duncan as a hostage, beginning a series of arguments as to whether the Scottish Crown owed allegiance to the King of England.

Normans went into Scotland, building castles and founding noble families that would provide some future kings, such as Robert the Bruce, as well as founding a considerable number of the Scottish clans. King David I of Scotland, whose elder brother Alexander I had married Sybilla of Normandy, was instrumental in introducing Normans and Norman culture to Scotland, part of the process some scholars call the "Davidian Revolution". Having spent time at the court of Henry I of England (married to David's sister Maud of Scotland), and needing them to wrestle the kingdom from his nephew Máel Coluim mac Alaxandair, David had to reward many with lands. The process was continued under David's successors, most intensely of all under William the Lion. The Norman-derived feudal system was applied in varying degrees to most of Scotland. Scottish families of the names Bruce, Gray, Ramsay, Fraser, Rose, Ogilvie, Montgomery, Sinclair, Pollock, Burnard, Douglas and Gordon to name but a few, and including the later royal House of Stewart, can all be traced back to Norman ancestry.

==== Wales ====
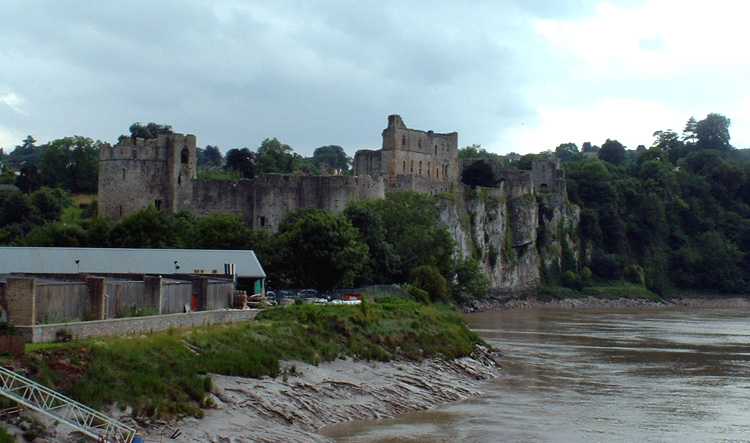
Chepstow Castle in Wales, built by William fitzOsbern in 1067

Even before the Norman Conquest of England, the Normans had come into contact with Wales. Edward the Confessor had set up the aforementioned Ralph as Earl of Hereford and charged him with defending the Marches and warring with the Welsh. In these original ventures, the Normans failed to make any headway into Wales.

After the Conquest, however, the Marches came completely under the dominance of William's most trusted Norman barons, including Bernard de Neufmarché, Robert Fitzhamon, Roger of Montgomery in Shropshire and Hugh Lupus in Cheshire. These Normans began a long period of slow conquest during which almost all of Wales was at some point subject to Norman interference. Norman words, such as baron (barwn), first entered Welsh at that time.

==== On crusade ====
The legendary religious zeal of the Normans was exercised in religious wars long before the First Crusade carved out a Norman principality in Antioch. They were major foreign combatants in the Reconquista in Iberia. In 1018, Roger de Tosny travelled to the Iberian Peninsula to carve out a state for himself from Moorish lands, but failed. In 1064, during the War of Barbastro, William of Montreuil, Roger Crispin and probably Walter Guiffard led an army under the papal banner which took a huge booty as they captured the city from its Andelusi rulers. Later a group of Normans led by a certain William (some have suggested this was William the Carpenter) participated in the failed siege of Tudela of 1087.

In 1096, Crusaders passing by the siege of Amalfi were joined by Bohemond of Taranto and his nephew Tancred with an army of Italo-Normans. Bohemond was the de facto leader of the Crusade during its passage through Asia Minor. After the successful Siege of Antioch in 1097, Bohemond began carving out an independent principality around that city. Tancred was instrumental in the conquest of Jerusalem and he worked for the expansion of the Crusader kingdom in Transjordan and the region of Galilee..

After the First Crusade to the Levant, the Normans continued with their involvement in Iberia as well as other areas of the Mediterranean. Among them was Rotrou of Perche and his followers Robert Burdet and William Giffard who joined multiple expeditions into the Ebro Valley to aid Alfonso I of Aragon in his campaigns of conquest. Robert Burdet managed to acquire the position of Alcide of Tudela by 1123 and later that of Prince of the city Tarragona in 1129.

==== Anglo-Norman conquest of Cyprus ====
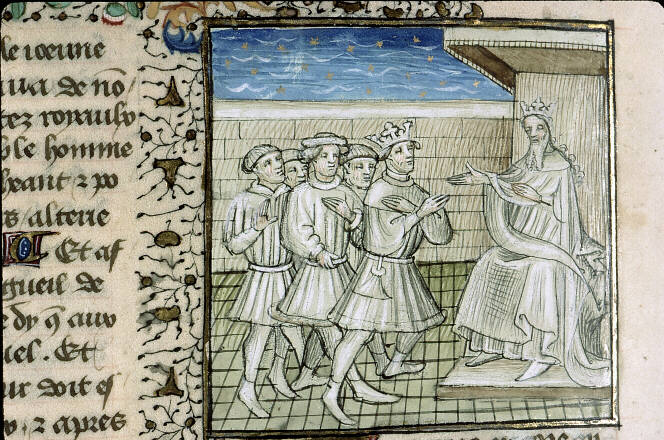
Illuminated manuscript showing King Richard the Lionheart authorizing Guy de Lusignan to take Cyprus

The conquest of Cyprus by the Anglo-Norman forces of the Third Crusade opened a new chapter in the history of the island, which would be under Western European domination for the following 380 years. Although not part of a planned operation, the conquest had much more permanent results than initially expected.

In April 1191, Richard the Lion-hearted left Messina with a large fleet in order to reach Acre. But a storm dispersed the fleet. After some searching, it was discovered that the boat carrying his sister and his fiancée Berengaria was anchored on the south coast of Cyprus, together with the wrecks of several other ships, including the treasure ship. Survivors of the wrecks had been taken prisoner by the island's despot Isaac Komnenos. On 1 May 1191, Richard's fleet arrived in the port of Limassol on Cyprus. He ordered Isaac to release the prisoners and the treasure. Isaac refused, so Richard landed his troops and took Limassol.

Various princes of the Holy Land arrived in Limassol at the same time, in particular Guy de Lusignan. All declared their support for Richard provided that he support Guy against his rival Conrad of Montferrat. The local barons abandoned Isaac, who considered making peace with Richard, joining him on the crusade, and offering his daughter in marriage to the person named by Richard. But Isaac changed his mind and tried to escape. Richard then proceeded to conquer the whole island, his troops being led by Guy de Lusignan. Isaac surrendered and was confined with silver chains, because Richard had promised that he would not place him in irons. By 1 June, Richard had conquered the whole island. His exploit was well publicized and contributed to his reputation; he also derived significant financial gains from the conquest of the island. Richard left for Acre on 5 June, with his allies. Before his departure, he named two of his Norman generals, Richard de Camville and Robert de Thornham, as governors of Cyprus.

While in Limassol, Richard the Lion-Heart married Berengaria of Navarre, first-born daughter of King Sancho VI of Navarre. The wedding was held on 12 May 1191 at the Chapel of St. George and it was attended by Richard's sister Joan, whom he had brought from Sicily. The marriage was celebrated with great pomp and splendor. Among other grand ceremonies was a double coronation: Richard caused himself to be crowned King of Cyprus, and Berengaria Queen of England and Queen of Cyprus as well.

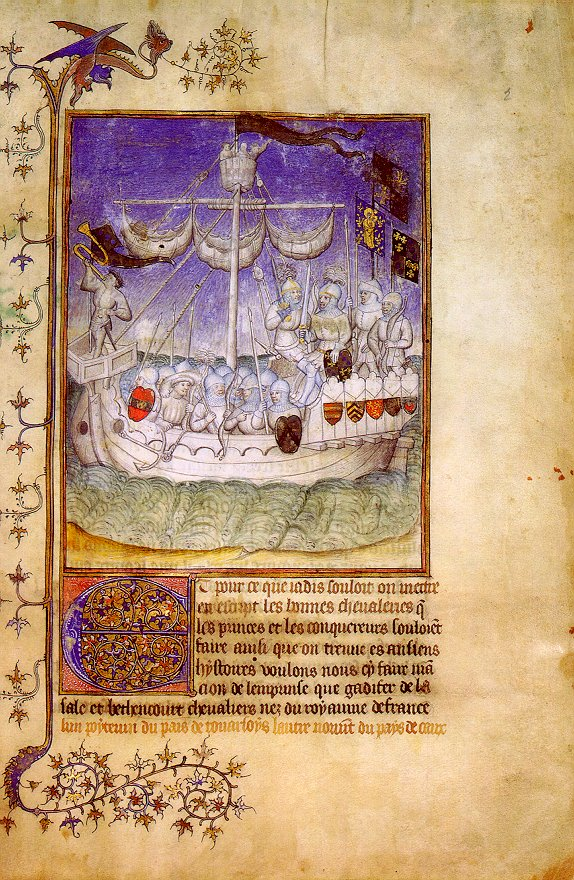
Norman expeditionary ship depicted in the chronicle Le Canarien (1490)

The rapid Anglo-Norman conquest proved more important than it seemed. The island occupied a key strategic position on the maritime lanes to the Holy Land, whose occupation by the Christians could not continue without support from the sea. Shortly after the conquest, Cyprus was sold to the Knights Templar and it was subsequently acquired, in 1192, by Guy de Lusignan and became a stable feudal kingdom. It was only in 1489 that the Venetians acquired full control of the island, which remained a Christian stronghold until the fall of Famagusta in 1571.

==== Canary Islands ====
Between 1402 and 1405, the expedition led by the Norman noble Jean de Bethencourt and the Poitevine Gadifer de la Salle conquered the Canarian islands of Lanzarote, Fuerteventura and El Hierro off the Atlantic coast of Africa. Their troops were gathered in Normandy, Gascony and were later reinforced by Castilian colonists.

Bethencourt took the title of King of the Canary Islands, as vassal to Henry III of Castile. In 1418, Jean's nephew Maciot de Bethencourt sold the rights to the islands to Enrique Pérez de Guzmán, 2nd Count de Niebla.

== Culture ==
=== Language ===
When Norse Vikings from Scandinavia arrived in the then-province of Neustria and settled the land that became known as Normandy, they originally spoke Old Norse, a North Germanic language. Over time, they came to live among the local Gallo-Romance-speaking population, with the two communities converging to the point that the original Norsemen largely assimilated and adopted the local dialect of Old French while contributing some elements from the Old Norse language. This Norse-influenced dialect which then arose was known as Old Norman, and it is the ancestor of both the modern Norman language still spoken today in the Channel Islands and parts of mainland Normandy, as well as the historical Anglo-Norman language in England. Old Norman was also an important language of the Principality of Antioch during Crusader rule in the Levant.

Old Norman and Anglo-Norman literature was quite extensive during the Middle Ages, with records existing from notable Norman poets such as Wace, who was born on the island of Jersey and raised in mainland Normandy.

=== Norman law ===
The customary law of Normandy was developed between the 10th and 13th centuries and survives today through the legal systems of Jersey and Guernsey in the Channel Islands. Norman customary law was transcribed in two customaries in Latin by two judges for use by them and their colleagues: These are the Très ancien coutumier (Very ancient customary), authored between 1200 and 1245; and the Grand coutumier de Normandie (Great customary of Normandy, originally Summa de legibus Normanniae in curia laïcali), authored between 1235 and 1245.

Norman law during the ducal period, between 1000 and 1144, blended local Frankish traditions, Carolingian legal structures, and Viking influences. This unique combination created a legal system distinct from both its Norse and Frankish predecessors. The Norse customs that were adopted emphasized community-based dispute resolution, honor, and reparation. The Carolingian legal principles that the Normans utilized were the written codes, administrative structure, and practices such as the use of oaths and ordeals. Lastly, the Normans wanted to preserve some of the existing customary practices in Normandy, particularly in rural areas, such as land ownership and inheritance, governance through local assemblies, and customary taxation and resource management.

In England, the Normans replaced the Anglo-Saxon landholding customs with a feudal system. Under this system, all land was held by the king, who granted it to nobles in exchange for military service and other obligations. The nobles, in turn, granted portions of their land to vassals, land holders for the king, which created a hierarchal structure of land tenure. The Domesday Book, written in 1086 formalized land ownership and feudal obligations in England, creating a legal framework form resolving disputes over property.

Legal obligations under this feudal system included required military service to the land's respective lords. Failure to meet these duties often resulted in forfeiture of land or other penalties. The disputes over land and feudal obligations were resolved in feudal courts. These courts operated at various levels: local, manorial, or baronial - and reinforced the feudal hierarchy by emphasizing the lord's role as the arbiter of justice within his domain.

=== Architecture ===
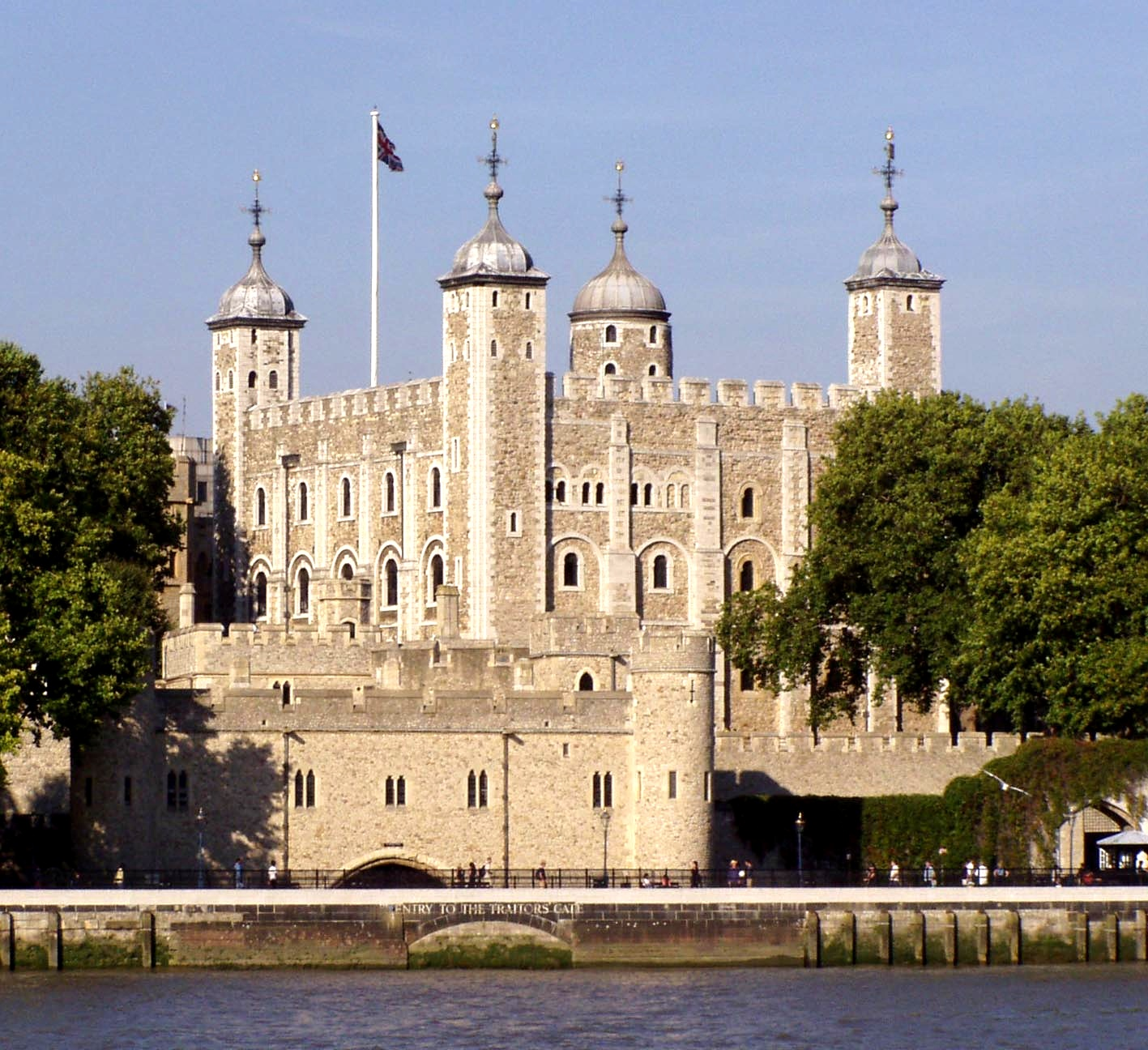
A quintessential Norman keep: the White Tower at the heart of the Tower of London

Norman architecture typically stands out as a new stage in the architectural history of the regions they subdued. They spread a unique Romanesque idiom to England, Italy and Ireland, and the encastellation of these regions with keeps in their north French style fundamentally altered the military landscape. Their style was characterised by rounded arches, particularly over windows and doorways, and massive proportions.

In England, the period of Norman architecture immediately succeeds that of the Anglo-Saxon and precedes the Early Gothic. In southern Italy, the Normans incorporated elements of Islamic, Lombard, and Byzantine building techniques into their own, initiating a unique romanesque style known as Norman-Arab architecture within the Kingdom of Sicily and precedes the Early Gothic.

=== Visual arts ===
In the visual arts, the Normans did not have the rich and distinctive traditions of the cultures they conquered. However, in the early 11th century, the dukes began a programme of church reform, encouraging the Cluniac reform of monasteries and patronising intellectual pursuits, especially the proliferation of scriptoria and the reconstitution of a compilation of lost illuminated manuscripts. The church was utilised by the dukes as a unifying force for their disparate duchy. The chief monasteries taking part in this "renaissance" of Norman art and scholarship were Mont-Saint-Michel, Fécamp, Jumièges, Bec, Saint-Ouen, Saint-Evroul, and Saint-Wandrille. These centres were in contact with the so-called "Winchester school", which channeled a pure Carolingian artistic tradition to Normandy. In the final decade of the 11th and first of the 12th century, Normandy experienced a golden age of illustrated manuscripts, but it was brief and the major scriptoria of Normandy ceased to function after the midpoint of the century.

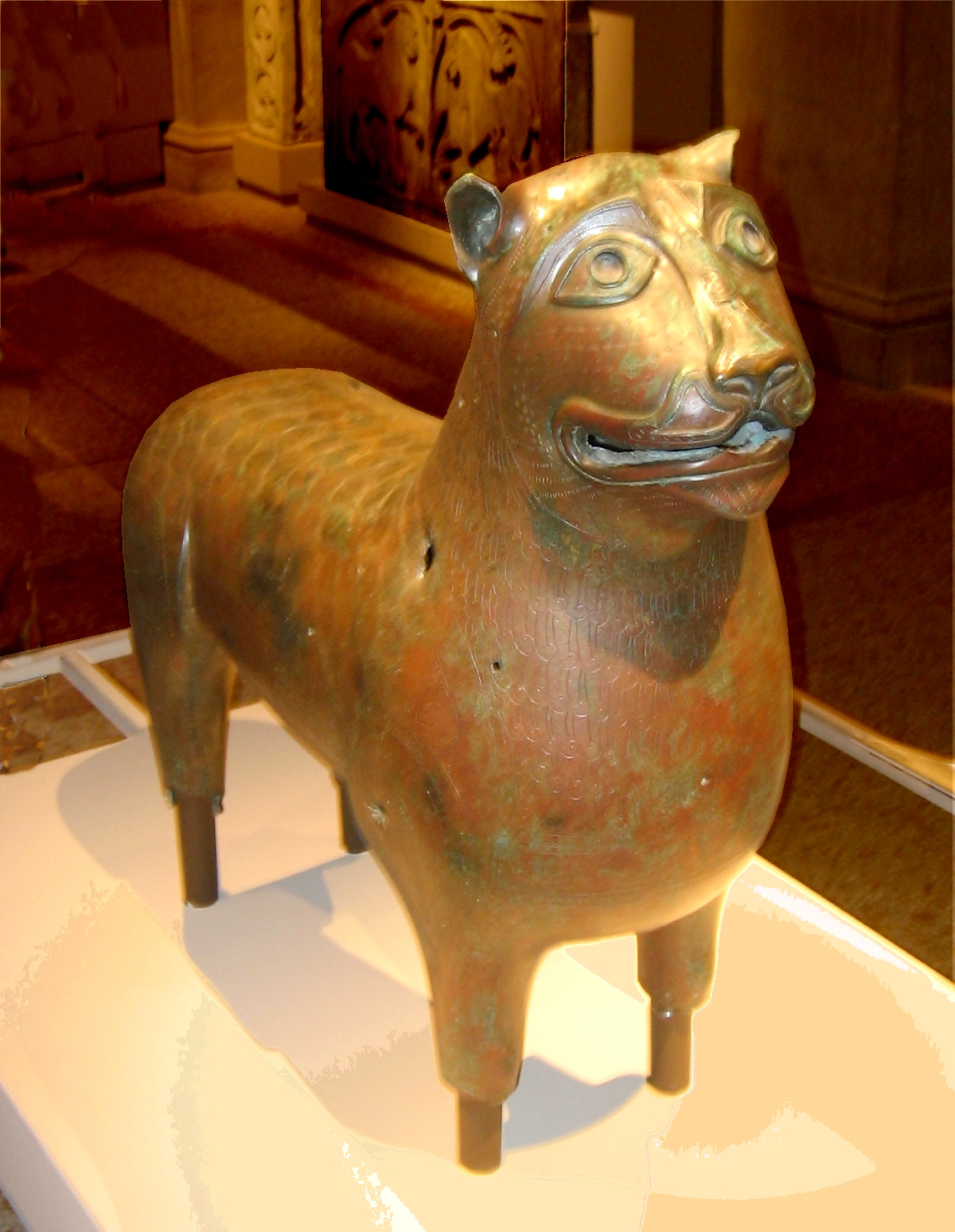
A bronze lion sculpture attributed to an Italo-Norman artist. Now in the Metropolitan Museum of Art

The French Wars of Religion in the 16th century and the French Revolution in the 18th successively destroyed much of what existed in the way of the architectural and artistic remnant of this Norman creativity. The former, with their violence, caused the wanton destruction of many Norman edifices; the latter, with its assault on religion, caused the purposeful destruction of religious objects of any type, and its destabilisation of society resulted in rampant pillaging.

By far the most famous work of Norman art is the Bayeux Tapestry, which is not a tapestry but a work of embroidery. It was commissioned by Odo, the Bishop of Bayeux and first Earl of Kent, employing natives from Kent who were learned in the Nordic traditions imported in the previous half century by the Danish Vikings.

In Britain, Norman art primarily survives as stonework or metalwork, such as capitals and baptismal fonts. In southern Italy, however, Norman artwork survives plentifully in forms strongly influenced by its Greek, Lombard, and Arab forebears. Of the royal regalia preserved in Palermo, the crown is Germanic and Byzantine in style and the coronation cloak is of Arab craftsmanship with Arabic inscriptions. Many churches preserve sculptured fonts, capitals, and more importantly mosaics, which were common in Norman Italy and drew heavily on the Greek heritage. Lombard Salerno was a centre of ivorywork in the 11th century and this continued under Norman domination.

=== Music ===
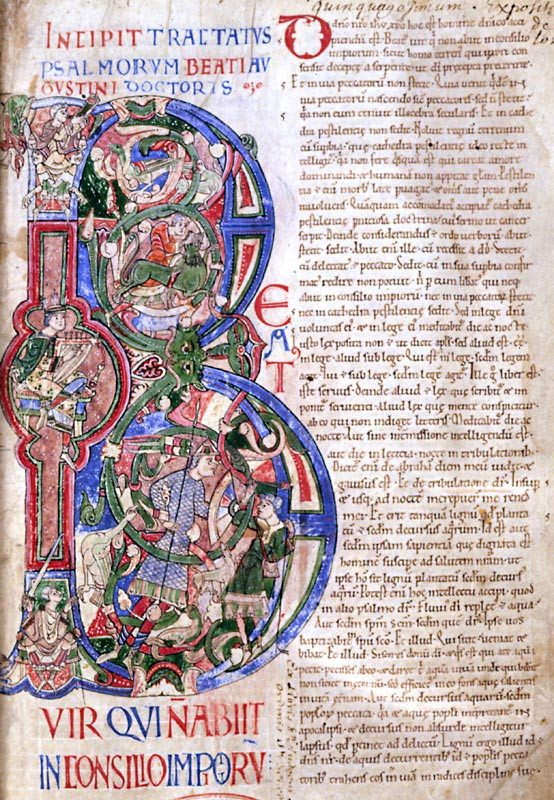
An illuminated manuscript from Saint-Evroul depicting King David on the lyre (or harp) in the middle of the back of the initial 'B'

Normandy was the site of several important developments in the history of classical music in the 11th century. Fécamp Abbey and Saint-Evroul Abbey were centres of musical production and education. At Fécamp, under two Italian abbots, William of Volpiano and John of Ravenna, the system of denoting notes by letters was developed and taught. It is still the most common form of pitch representation in English- and German-speaking countries today. Also at Fécamp, the staff, around which neumes were oriented, was first developed and taught in the 11th century. Under the German abbot Isembard, La Trinité-du-Mont became a centre of musical composition.

At Saint Evroul, a tradition of singing had developed and the choir achieved fame in Normandy. Under the Norman abbot Robert de Grantmesnil, several monks of Saint-Evroul fled to southern Italy, where they were patronised by Robert Guiscard and established a Latin monastery at Sant'Eufemia Lamezia. There they continued the tradition of singing.

== Rulers ==
- List of dukes of Normandy
- List of counts and dukes of Apulia and Calabria
- List of counts of Aversa
- List of princes of Capua
- List of dukes of Gaeta
- List of princes of Taranto
- List of princes of Antioch
- List of officers of the Principality of Antioch
- Second House of Lusignan
- List of English monarchs
- List of Scottish monarchs
- List of Sicilian monarchs

== See also ==
- Bailiwick of Guernsey
- Bailiwick of Jersey
- Channel Islands
- Cotentin Peninsula
- House of Normandy
- Norman language
- Norsemen
- Rus' people
- Charter to the Normans

== Sources ==
=== Primary ===
- van Houts, Elisabeth, ed. (2000), The Normans in Europe, Manchester: Manchester Medieval Sources.
- Medieval History Texts in Translation, University of Leeds, archived from the original on 31 August 2011.

=== Secondary ===
- Bates, David (1982), Normandy before 1066, London
- Beihammer, Alexander Daniel (2017). Byzantium and the Emergence of Muslim-Turkish Anatolia, Ca. 1040–1130. Taylor & Francis. ISBN 978-1351983860.
- Brown, R. Allen (1994), The Normans and the Norman Conquest, Boydell & Brewer
- Chalandon, Ferdinand (1907), Histoire de la domination normande en Italie et en Sicilie [History of the Norman domination in Italy & Sicily] (in French), Paris
- Chibnall, Marjorie (2000), The Normans, The Peoples of Europe, Oxford.
- ——— (1999), The Debate on the Norman Conquest
- Crouch, David (2003), The Normans: The History of a Dynasty, London: Hambledon.
- Douglas, David (1969), The Norman Achievement 1050-1100, London
- ——— (1976), The Norman Fate, London
- Dauzat, Albert; Dubois, Jean; Mitterand, Henri (1971), Larousse étymologique [Etymological Larousse] (in French), Larousse
- Flori, Jean (1999), Richard Coeur de Lion: le roi-chevalier [Richard Lionheart: the king-knight], Biographie (in French), Paris: Payot, ISBN 978-2-228-89272-8
- Gillingham, John (2001), The Angevin Empire, London
- Gravett, Christopher; Nicolle, David (2006), The Normans: Warrior Knights and their Castles, Oxford: Osprey Publishing.
- Green, Judith A (1997), The Aristocracy of Norman England, Cambridge University Press
- Gunn, Peter (1975), Normandy: Landscape with Figures, London: Victor Gollancz
- Harper-Bill, Christopher; van Houts, Elisabeth, eds. (2003), A Companion to the Anglo-Norman World, Boydell
- Haskins, Charles H (1918), Norman Institutions
- Maitland, FW (1988), Domesday Book and Beyond: Three Essays in the Early History of England (2d ed.), Cambridge University Press (feudal Saxons)
- Mortimer, R (1994), Angevin England 1154–1258, Oxford
- Muhlbergher, Stephen, Medieval England (Saxon social demotions)
- Norwich, John Julius (1967), The Normans in the South 1016–1130, London: Longmans, Green and Co.
- ——— (1970), The Kingdom in the Sun 1130–1194, London: Longman Group Ltd.
- Robertson, AJ, ed. (1974), Laws of the Kings of England from Edmund to Henry I, AMS (Mudrum fine)
- Painter, Sidney (1953), A History of the Middle Ages 284−1500, New York
- Thompson, Kathleen (October 1987), "The Norman Aristocracy before 1066: the Example of the Montgomerys", Historical Research, 60 (143): 251–63, doi:10.1111/j.1468-2281.1987.tb00496.x
- Villegas-Aristizábal, Lucas (2004), "Algunas notas sobre la participación de Rogelio de Tosny en la Reconquista Ibérica" [Some notes on the participation of Rogelio de Tosny in the Iberian reconquest], Estudios Humanísticos. Historia, Estudios Humanísticos (in Spanish), III (3), Universidad de Leon: 263–74, doi:10.18002/ehh.v0i3.3060, hdl:10612/1104, archived from the original on 21 September 2011
- ——— (2007), Norman and Anglo-Norman Participation in the Iberian Reconquista (PhD thesis), University of Nottingham
- ——— (2008), Roger of Tosny's adventures in the County of Barcelona, Nottingham Medieval Studies, vol. 52, pp. 5–16
- ——— (2009), "Anglo-Norman involvement in the conquest of Tortosa and Settlement of Tortosa, 1148–1180", Crusades, 8: 63–129, doi:10.1080/28327861.2009.12220130, archived from the original on 17 August 2021
- ——— (July 2015), "Norman and Anglo-Norman Interventions in the Iberian Wars of Reconquest Before and After the First Crusade", Crusading and Pilgrimage in the Norman World, pp. 103–21
- ——— (2017), "Spiritual and Material Rewards on the Christian-Muslim Frontier: Norman Crusaders in the Valley of the Ebro", Medievalismo, 27: 353–376, doi:10.6018/medievalismo.27.310701, hdl:10201/56696
- ——— (May 2021), "The Changing Priorities in the Norman Incursions into the Iberian Peninsula's Muslim–Christian Frontiers, 1018–1191", Normans in the Mediterranean, Medieval Identities: Socio-Cultural Spaces, vol. 9, pp. 81–119, doi:10.1484/M.MISCS-EB.5.121958, ISBN 978-2-503-59057-8, S2CID 236690847
- Vranousi, Era A. (1962), "Κομισκόρτης ο έξ Αρβάνων": Σχόλια εις Χωρίον της Άννης Κομνηνής (Δ' 8,4) (in Greek), Ioannina: Εταιρείας Ηπειρωτικών Μελετών
