= Lordship of the Canary Islands =

European title

- Former subdivision of Kingdom of Castile
- 1402–1502
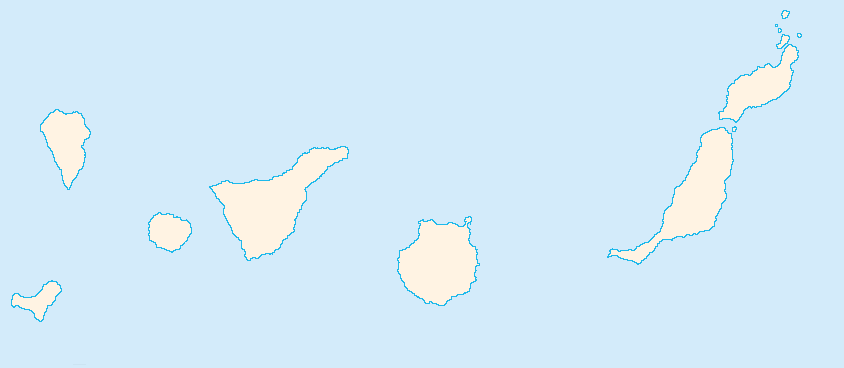
- Map of the Canary Islands
- Capital: Teguise
  - Type: Lordship
- Historical era: Age of Discovery
  - Created by Henry III of Castile for Jean de Béthencourt: 1402
  - Division among the children of Inés Peraza and her death: 1502

The Lordship of the Canary Islands was a late medieval Lordship of the Crown of Castile that originally included all the islands of the Atlantic archipelago of the Canary Islands. It was created in 1402 by King Henry III of Castile in favor of the French knight Jean de Béthencourt, who had begun the conquest of the Canary Islands and had paid homage to the Castilian monarch.

== History ==
Once the Franco-Norman conquering expedition commanded by Jean de Béthencourt and Gadifer de La Salle managed to establish themselves on the island of Lanzarote in the summer of 1402, Béthencourt left for Castile at the end of that year in search of reinforcements and provisions. Once at court, he paid homage to King Henry III of Castile and he accepted him as a vassal. The King recognised his seigniorial right to conquer the Canary Islands, as well as granting him exemption from paying the fifths owed to the Admiral of Castile for the goods exported from the archipelago. Henry III also supported the enterprise with financial and material aid.

The fiefdom created on the islands was characterised in these early days by its relative independence from the Castilian Crown, establishing the uses and customs of Normandy and France. The new Lord, with the title of "King", obtained authorization from the monarch John II of Castile to mint his own currency and was in charge of administering justice. In addition, after the enfeoffment of the islands, ships that intended to approach the Canary Islands had to have the express authorization of the new Lord.

In 1414 Béthencourt abandoned the islands and returned for good to France, leaving the government and exploitation of the Lordship in the hands of his relatives Maciot, Juanín and Enrique de Béthencourt.

In 1418 Maciot, who had remained as the sole representative and governor, sold the lordship of the conquered islands with the authorization of Jean de Béthencourt to Enrique de Guzmán, 2nd Count of Niebla. The count left Maciot as governor in his name.

On the other hand, in 1420 King John II granted the right of conquest over the rest of the islands to Alfonso de las Casas. The latter divided the islands among his sons when he died in 1421, leaving Gran Canaria and La Gomera to Guillén de las Casas, Tenerife to Francisco and La Palma to Pedro.

In 1430, Guillén and his relative Juan de las Casas bought the Count of Niebla's rights to the islands of Lanzarote, Fuerteventura and El Hierro, again leaving Maciot as Governor of Lanzarote.

In 1445, the Lordship passed to Juan de las Casas' son-in-law Hernan Peraza the Elder, and when he died in 1452, he was succeeded as Lord of the Canary Islands by his only daughter Inés Peraza, who married Diego de Herrera.

In 1477, the Lords of the Canary Islands were forced to cede to the Catholic Monarchs their rights to the still unconquered islands of Gran Canaria, Tenerife and La Palma. The Lords were compensated with five million Maravedíes , and with the promise of the title of "Count of La Gomera", according to Francisco López de Gómara.

However, the fragmentation of the Lordship had already begun in 1474 when Inés Peraza ceded the island of El Hierro to her first-born son Pedro García de Herrera. Later, she would do the same in 1478 with La Gomera in favor of her second son Hernan Peraza the Younger. The latter would also take over the Lordship over El Hierro when his mother donated it to him in 1486, after Pedro had been disinherited. Finally, in 1502 Inés Peraza made an inter vivos donation of Fuerteventura, Lanzarote and the islets, jointly to her other children Sancho de Herrera, María de Ayala and Constanza Sarmiento.

== Lords the Canary Islands ==
	Title	Period
Lords the Canary Islands
I	Jean de Béthencourt	1402–1418
II	Enrique de Guzmán	1418–1430
III	Guillén and Juan de las Casas	1430–1445
IV	Hernan Peraza the Elder	1445–1452
V	Inés Peraza	1452–1502

== Sources ==
- Aznar Vallejo, Eduardo (2004). "La transmisión del señorío de Canarias en el siglo XV. Nuevos documentos y perspectivas". In Cabildo Insular de Gran Canaria (ed.). XV Coloquio de historia canario-americana (2002). Francisco Morales Padrón (coordinador). Las Palmas de Gran Canaria. pp. 1940–1969. ISBN 84-8103-379-0.
- Cebrián Latasa, José Antonio (2003). Consejería de Educación, Cultura y Deportes del Gobierno de Canarias (ed.). Ensayo para un diccionario de conquistadores de Canarias. Islas Canarias. hdl:20.500.12285/mdcte/3187. ISBN 84-241-5235-2.
- Cioranescu, Alejandro; Serra Ràfols, Elías (1964). Instituto de Estudios Canarios (ed.). Le Canarien: crónicas francesas de la conquista de Canarias. Vol. III. Texto G. Apéndices e índices. San Cristóbal de La Laguna. hdl:20.500.12285/mdcte/1423.
- Díaz Padilla, Gloria; Rodríguez Yanes, José Miguel (1990). Cabildo Insular de El Hierro; Cabildo Insular de La Gomera (ed.). El señorío en las Canarias occidentales. La Gomera y El Hierro hasta 1700 (PDF). Islas Canarias.
- Ladero Quesada, Miguel Ángel (2012). Universidad Complutense de Madrid (ed.). Don Enrique de Guzmán, el "buen conde de Niebla" (1375–1436). En la España medieval. Vol. 35. Madrid. pp. 211–247. doi:10.5209/rev_ELEM.2012.v35.38909. ISSN 1988-2971.
- López de Gómara, Francisco (2003) [1552]. Biblioteca Virtual Universal (ed.). Historia general de las Indias (PDF).
- Peraza de Ayala, José (1956). Universidad de La Laguna (ed.). La sucesión del señorío de Canarias a partir de Alfonso de las Casas. Revista de Historia. San Cristóbal de La Laguna. pp. 45–52. hdl:20.500.12285/revhistoria/899. ISSN 0213-9464.
- Peraza de Ayala, José (1957). Universidad de La Laguna (ed.). Juan de Las Casas y el señorío de Canarias. Revista de Historia Canaria. San Cristóbal de La Laguna. pp. 65–82. hdl:20.500.12285/revhiscan/17. ISSN 0213-9472.
- Pérez Camarma, Alberto (2012). "El modelo político seguido en las Islas Canarias concerniente a su incorporación a la Corona de Castilla". In Cabildo Insular de Gran Canaria (ed.). XIX Coloquio de Historia Canario-Americana (2010). Francisco Morales Padrón (coordinator). Las Palmas de Gan Canaria. pp. 845–862. ISBN 978-84-8103-650-3.
- Rumeu de Armas, Antonio (1986). Patronato de la Casa de Colón (ed.). El señorío de Fuerteventura en el siglo XVI. Anuario de Estudios Atlánticos. Vol. 1. las Palmas de Gran Canaria. pp. 17–128. ISSN 0570-4065.
