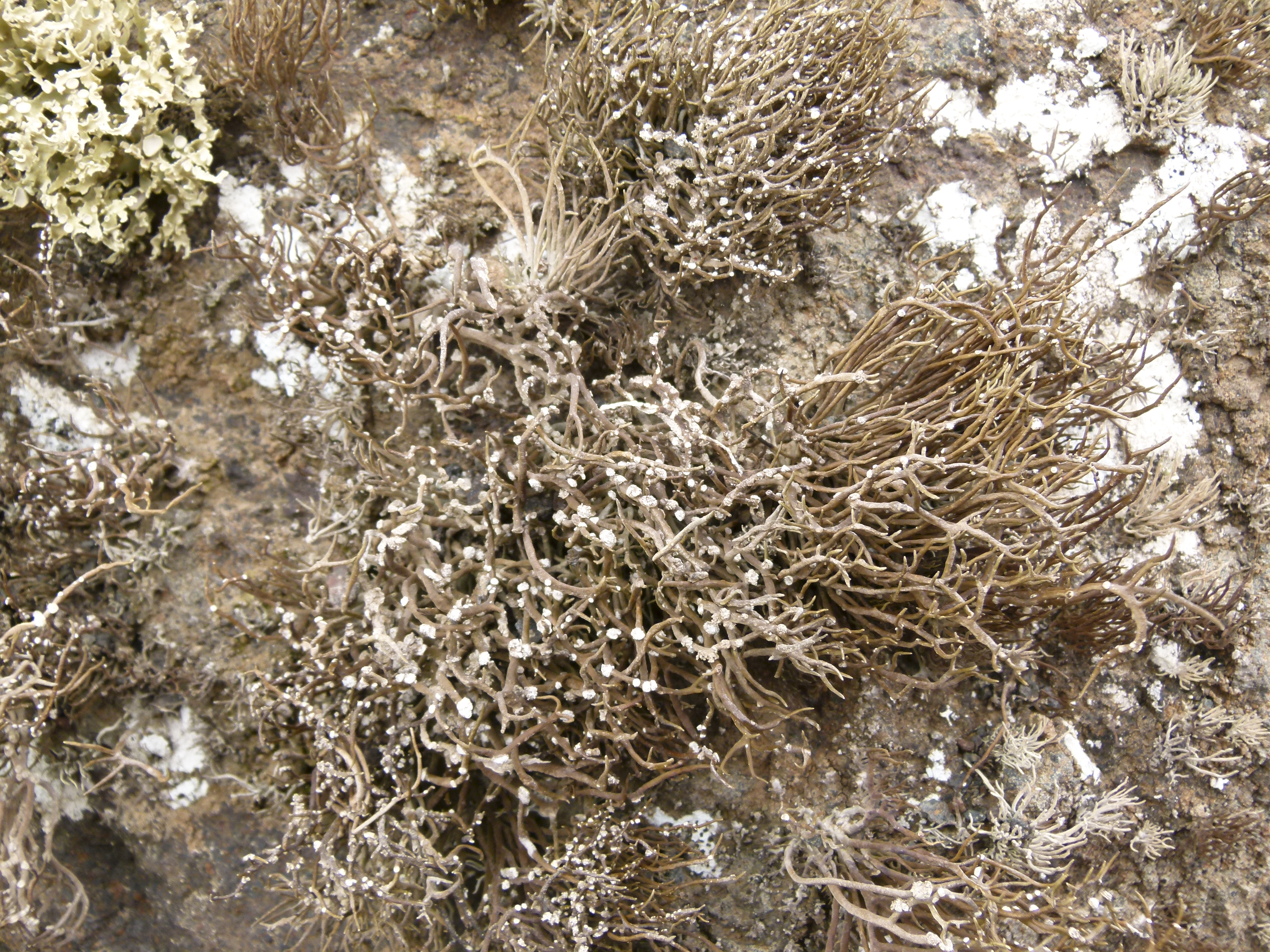
- Roccella tinctoria.

Scientific classification
- Kingdom: Fungi
- Division: Ascomycota
- Class: Arthoniomycetes
- Order: Arthoniales
- Family: Roccellaceae
- Genus: Roccella
- Species: R. tinctoria

Binomial name
- Roccella tinctoria DC.

= Roccella tinctoria =

Species of fungus

Roccella tinctoria is a lichenised species of fungus in the genus Roccella, homotypic synonym of Lecanora tinctoria (DC.) Czerwiak., 1849. It was first described by Augustin Pyramus de Candolle in 1805. It has the following varieties:

- R. t. var. portentosa
- R. t. var. subpodicellata
- R. t. var. tinctoria

and formae:

- R. t. f. complanata
- R. t. f. tinctoria

== Uses ==
It is used to make litmus, a mixture of several organic compounds.

Lichen has been used for centuries to make dyes. This includes royal purple colors derived from Roccella tinctoria, also known as orseille. The process of making this dye was a secret and lead to the wealth of the weavers of Grainville-la-Teinturière and the Rucellai family of Florence, whose family name is related with the Latin name of the lichen, oricellum. There has been speculation that the abundance of R. tinctoria on the Canary Islands offered a profit motive for Jean de Béthencourt during his conquest of the islands.

Orcinol, a natural phenolic organic compound, occurs in many species of lichens including R. tinctoria.
