= Kingdom of the Canary Islands =

Vassal state of the Crown of Castile

Coordinates: 27.948°N 15.603°W

Kingdom of the Canary Islands Reino de las Islas Canarias (Spanish)
- 1404–1450
- Flag Coat of arms
- Status: Vassal state of the Crown of Castile
- Capital: Betancuria (1404–1425); Teguise (1425–1450)
- Common languages: Norman, Early Modern Spanish, Guanche
- Religion: Catholicism (Official), Guanche religion
- Government: Monarchy
- King
  - 1404–1425: Jean de Béthencourt
  - 1425–1448: Maciot de Béthencourt
- Historical era: Middle Ages
  - Conquest of Lanzarote: 1404
  - Lordship of Lanzarote, Fuerteventura, and El Hierro sold to Portugal (disputed by Castile): 1450
| Preceded by | Succeeded by |
| Guanches | Kingdom of Portugal; Crown of Castile |
- Today part of: Spain

The Kingdom of the Canary Islands (Spanish: Reino de las Islas Canarias) was a vassal state of the Crown of Castile located in North Africa, lasting from 1404 to 1450.

== First contact by Europeans ==
Apart from earlier contact by Romans, one of the first known Europeans to have encountered the Canaries was the Genoan navigator Lancelotto Malocello. He arrived on the island of Lanzarote (which was probably named after him) in 1312 and stayed for almost two decades until he was expelled during a revolt by the native Guanches under the leadership of their king Zonzamas.

== Conquest ==
The conquest of the Canaries was started in 1402 by French-Norman explorer Jean de Béthencourt. He had set sail from France one year earlier with a small army. He started the conquest in a rather friendly way by taking over the island of Lanzarote with the help of the locals. They would soon also take Fuerteventura and El Hierro. Their present king Guadarfia was the grandson of Zonzamas, who was king when Lancelotto Malocello had visited the island earlier.

When Béthencourt left the island for reinforcements from Castile, unrest broke out because of fighting between Norman officer Gadifer de la Salle and Berthin de Berneval, in which the natives had been involved. However, Béthencourt managed to calm the situation when he returned, and the Guanche leader was baptized on February 27, 1404, thus surrendering to the Europeans. Subsequently, Jean de Béthencourt was proclaimed king of the Canaries by Pope Innocent VII, even though he recognized the Castilians as overlords. The remaining islands, La Gomera, Gran Canaria, Tenerife and La Palma, were gradually conquered over the course of a century or so.

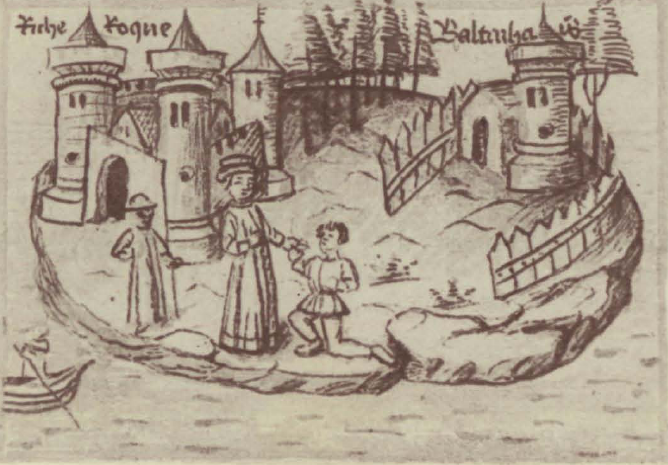
Miniature from chapter LXI in contemporary chronicle "Le Canarien", illustrating Béthencourt and Gadifer during their exploits in Fuerteventura.

Jean de Béthencourt was, after his death, succeeded by his nephew Maciot de Béthencourt, who turned out to be a tyrant. He established Teguise as the new capital. The Portuguese had been competing with the Castilians for the islands. The Castilians suspected that Maciot would sell the islands to them, which he did in 1448. Neither the natives nor the Castilians approved, and this led to a revolt which lasted until 1459 when the Portuguese were forced to leave. Portugal formally recognised Castile as the ruler of the Canary Islands in 1479 as part of the Treaty of Alcáçovas.

The military governor Alonso Fernández de Lugo finally conquered the islands of La Palma (in 1492–1493) and Tenerife (in 1494–1496) for the Crown of Castile, thus completing the conquest of the island group.
