= Grainville-la-Teinturière =

- Commune
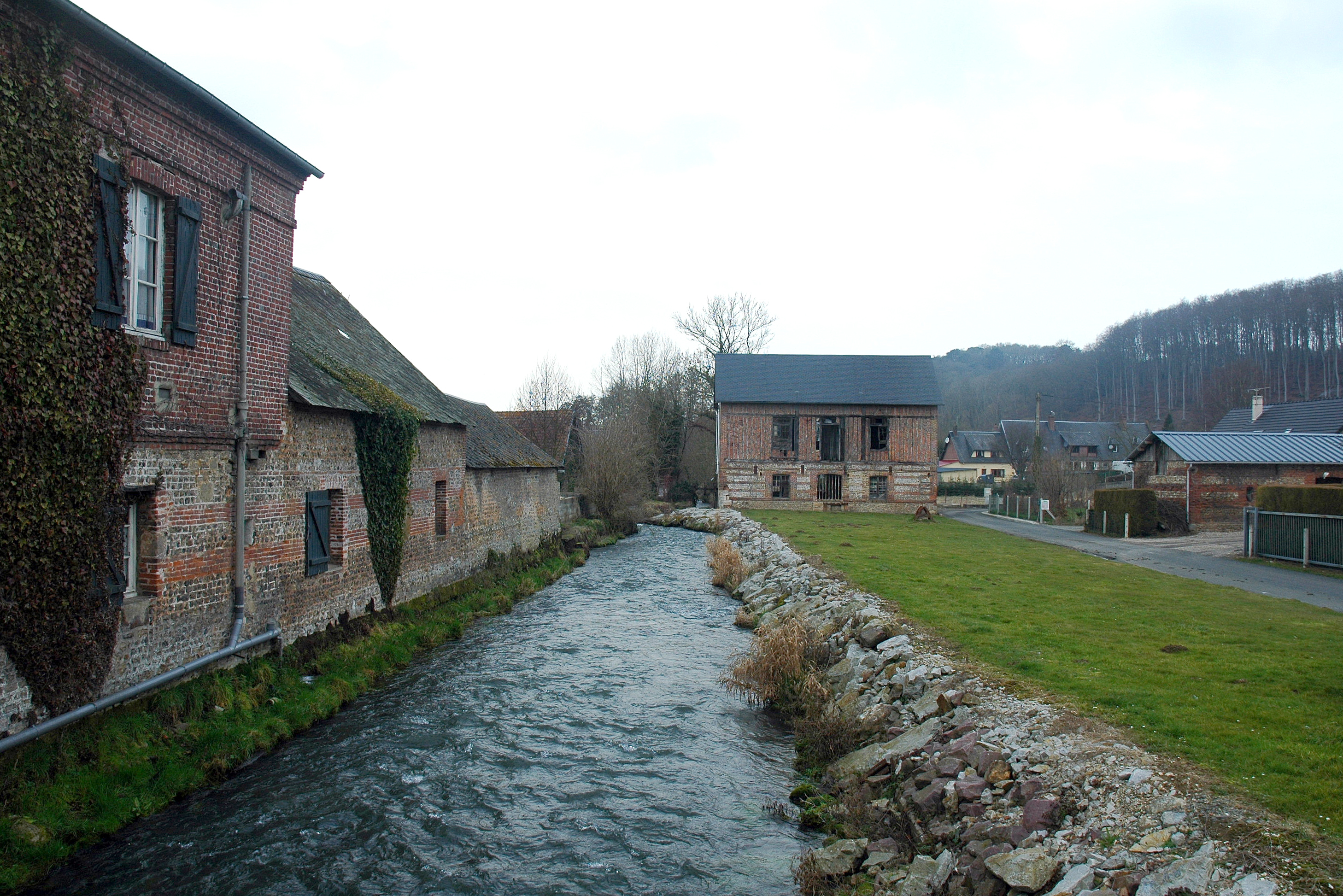
- The mill in Grainville-la-Teinturière

- Coat of arms
- Location of Grainville-la-Teinturière
- Location within France Location within Normandy
- Coordinates: 49°44′55″N 0°38′30″E
- Country: France
- Region: Normandy
- Department: Seine-Maritime
- Arrondissement: Dieppe
- Canton: Saint-Valery-en-Caux
- Intercommunality: CC Côte d'Albâtre

Government
  - Mayor (2026–32): René Vimont
- Area^{1}: 18.41 km^{2} (7.11 sq mi)
- Elevation: 8 m (26 ft)
- Highest elevation: 142 m (466 ft)
- Lowest elevation: 25 m (82 ft)
- Population (2023): 1,048
  - Density: 56.93/km^{2} (147.4/sq mi)
- Time zone: UTC+01:00 (CET)
  - Summer (DST): UTC+02:00 (CEST)
- INSEE/Postal code: 76315 /76450
- ^{1} French Land Register data, which excludes lakes, ponds, glaciers > 1 km^{2} (0.386 sq mi or 247 acres) and river estuaries.

Grainville-la-Teinturière (French pronunciation: [ɡʁɛ̃vil la tɛ̃tyʁjɛːʁ]) is a commune in the Seine-Maritime department in the Normandy region in northern France.

== Geography ==
A farming and forestry village situated by the banks of the river Durdent in the Pays de Caux, some 28 miles (45 km) southwest of Dieppe, at the junction of the D71, the D75 and the D131 roads.

== Population ==
Historical population
| Year | Pop. | ±% p.a. |
|---|---|---|
| 1968 | 801 | — |
| 1975 | 860 | +1.02% |
| 1982 | 882 | +0.36% |
| 1990 | 964 | +1.12% |
| 1999 | 990 | +0.30% |
| 2007 | 1,045 | +0.68% |
| 2012 | 1,066 | +0.40% |
| 2017 | 1,078 | +0.22% |
| 2023 | 1,048 | −0.47% |
Source: INSEE

== Places of interest ==
- The church of Notre-Dame, dating from the sixteenth century.
- Vestiges of an 11th-century castle: motte; donjon; moat
- A museum dedicated to Jean de Béthencourt, explorer, who died at the castle.

== Twin towns ==
- (Spain) Teguise, Lanzarote, in the Canary Islands.
- (Spain) Betancuria, Fuerteventura, in the Canary Islands.

== See also ==
- Communes of the Seine-Maritime department
