= Robert Crispin =

Norman mercenary

Robert Crispin (French: Crépin, died 1072), called Frankopoulos, was a Norman mercenary who fought in the Reconquista and the Byzantine Empire.

== Early life ==
Robert was the son of Gilbert Crispin. He had two older brothers, Gilbert, lord of Tilliers, and William, who became lord in Neaufles (Neaufles-Saint-Martin or Neaufles-Auvergny), as well as two sisters, Emma and Esilia. As the youngest son without an inheritance he left Normandy and seems to have gone to Southern Italy which was being conquered by fellow Normans under the Hauteville family. In 1064, he participated in a military expedition to Barbastro, which has been called sometimes a proto-crusade, where he played a major role and might have been the leader of the Norman contingent.

== Service in the Byzantine Empire ==
Robert then returned to Southern Italy and entered the services of the Byzantine Empire some three or four years after the expedition. The next information about his life is that he became the leader of a corps of his countrymen stationed at Edessa under the command of the general Isaac Komnenos. Robert became leader of the Frankish mercenaries and was arrested by the Emperor Romanos Diogenes in 1069 after a brief rebellion, feeling he had not been rewarded appropriately for his services. He fought against the invading Seljuk Turks and later under Michael VII Doukas against Romanos after the latter had been deposed in 1071 after the Battle of Manzikert. Having defeated Romanos, he returned to Constantinople where he was supposedly poisoned around 1072. His successor as leader of the Frankish mercenaries was Roussel de Bailleul.

== Sources ==
- Ferreiro, Alberto (June 1983). "The siege of Barbastro 1064–65: A Reassessment". Journal of Medieval History. 9 (2): 129–144. doi:10.1016/0304-4181(83)90005-2.
- Gravett, Christopher; Nicolle, David (2006). The Normans: Warrior Knights and their Castles. Oxford, United Kingdom: Osprey Publishing Limited. ISBN 1-84603-218-0.
- Kaldellis, Anthony (2017). Streams of Gold, Rivers of Blood: The Rise and Fall of Byzantium, 955 A.D. to the First Crusade. USA: Oxford University Press. ISBN 978-0190253240.
- Wierzbiński, Szymon (2006). "Normans and Other Franks in 11th Century Byzantium: the Careers of the Adventurers before the Rule of Alexius I Comnenus". Studia Ceranea. 4, 2014. Łódź, Poland: University of Łódź, Poland: 277–288.
- "Robert Crepin, Norman mercenary". Prosopography of the Byzantine World. King's Digital Lab.
