= Betancuria =

- Municipality
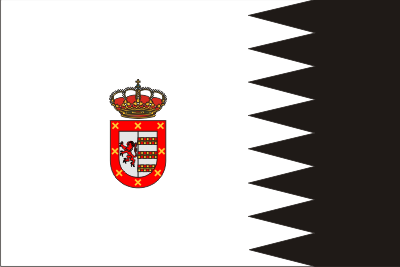
- Flag Coat of arms

- Municipal location in Fuerteventura

- Location in the province of Las Palmas Betancuria (Canary Islands) Betancuria (Spain, Canary Islands)
- Coordinates: 28°25′30″N 14°3′20″W
- Country: Spain
- Autonomous Community: Canary Islands
- Province: Las Palmas
- Island: Fuerteventura

Area
  - Total: 103.64 km^{2} (40.02 sq mi)

Population (2025-01-01)
  - Total: 801
  - Density: 7.73/km^{2} (20.0/sq mi)
- Time zone: UTC±00:00 (WET)
  - Summer (DST): UTC+01:00 (WEST)

Betancuria is a small town and a municipality in the western part of the island of Fuerteventura in the Province of Las Palmas, Canary Islands, Spain. The population is 811 (2013), and the area is 103.64 km^{2} (40 sq mi). It is situated in a mountainous region, 4 km (2 mi) west of Antigua and 21 km (13 mi) southwest of the island capital Puerto del Rosario. By population it is the smallest municipality in Fuerteventura as well as all of the Canary Islands. Betancuria is named after Jean de Béthencourt, who founded the town in 1404 with Gadifer de La Salle. It was the original capital of the Kingdom of the Canary Islands, and later capital of Fuerteventura.

In 1424 Pope Martin V erected in Betancuria brief Bishopric of Fuerteventura, which encompassed all the Canary Islands except the island of Lanzarote. The origin of this bishopric is directly related to the events that occurred after the Great Schism (1378-1417). This was because the bishop of San Marcial del Rubicón in Lanzarote (only diocese at the time of the Canary Islands) did not recognize the papacy of Martin V, as this bishop was a supporter of anti-Pope Benedict XIII. The Bishopric of Fuerteventura was based in Parish of Santa María de Betancuria, for it to rank high cathedral. After the reintegration of the Diocese of San Marcial del Rubicón in the papacy of Martin V, the Bishopric of Fuerteventura was abolished only seven years after it was created in 1431. It was razed by pirates in 1593, but remained capital of Fuerteventura until 1834, when Antigua became capital. In Vega de Rio Palmas is the hermitage of the Virgen de la Peña, the patron saint of the island of Fuerteventura.

== Gallery ==
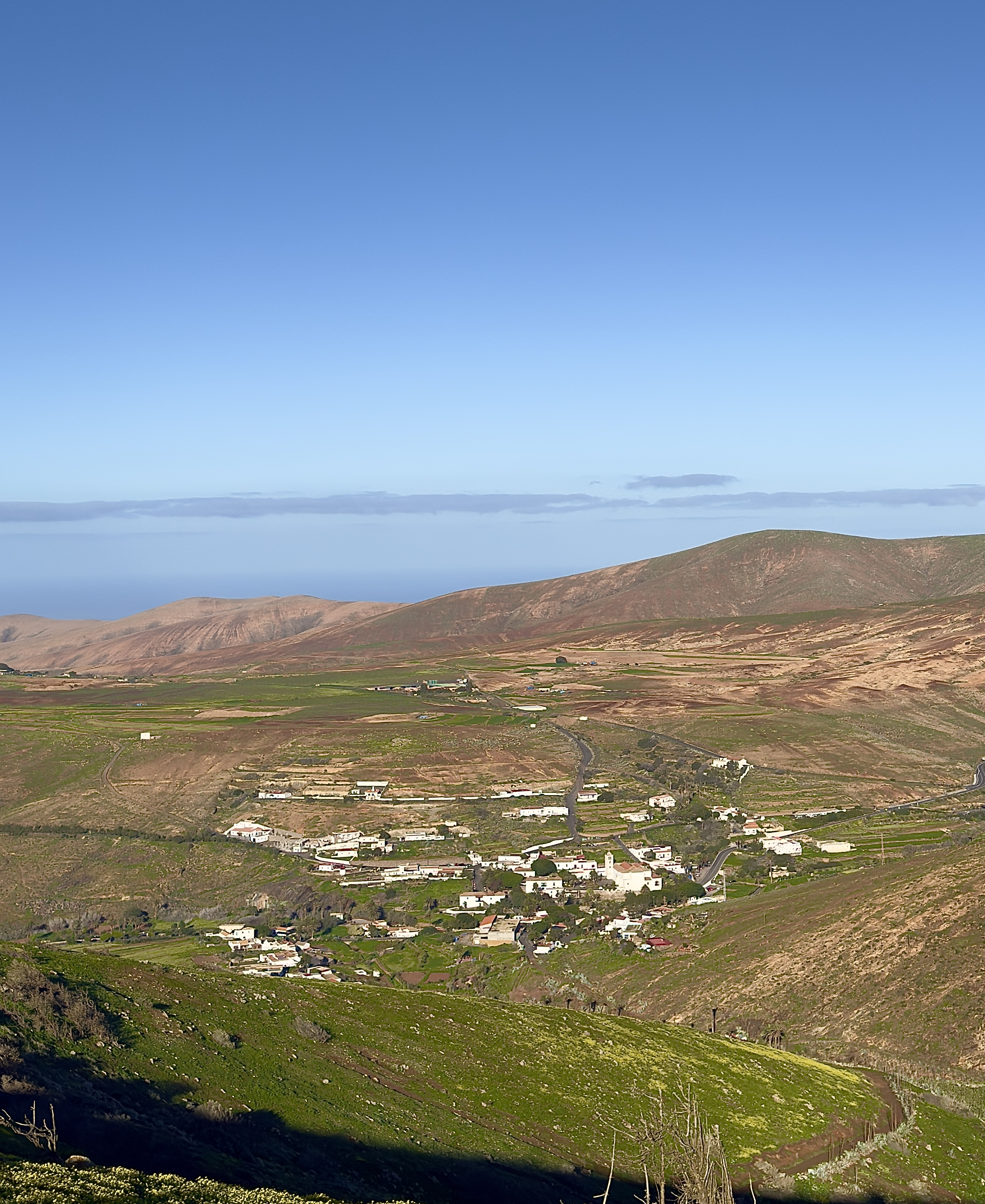
Morning view of Betancuria from Degollada de Marrubio.

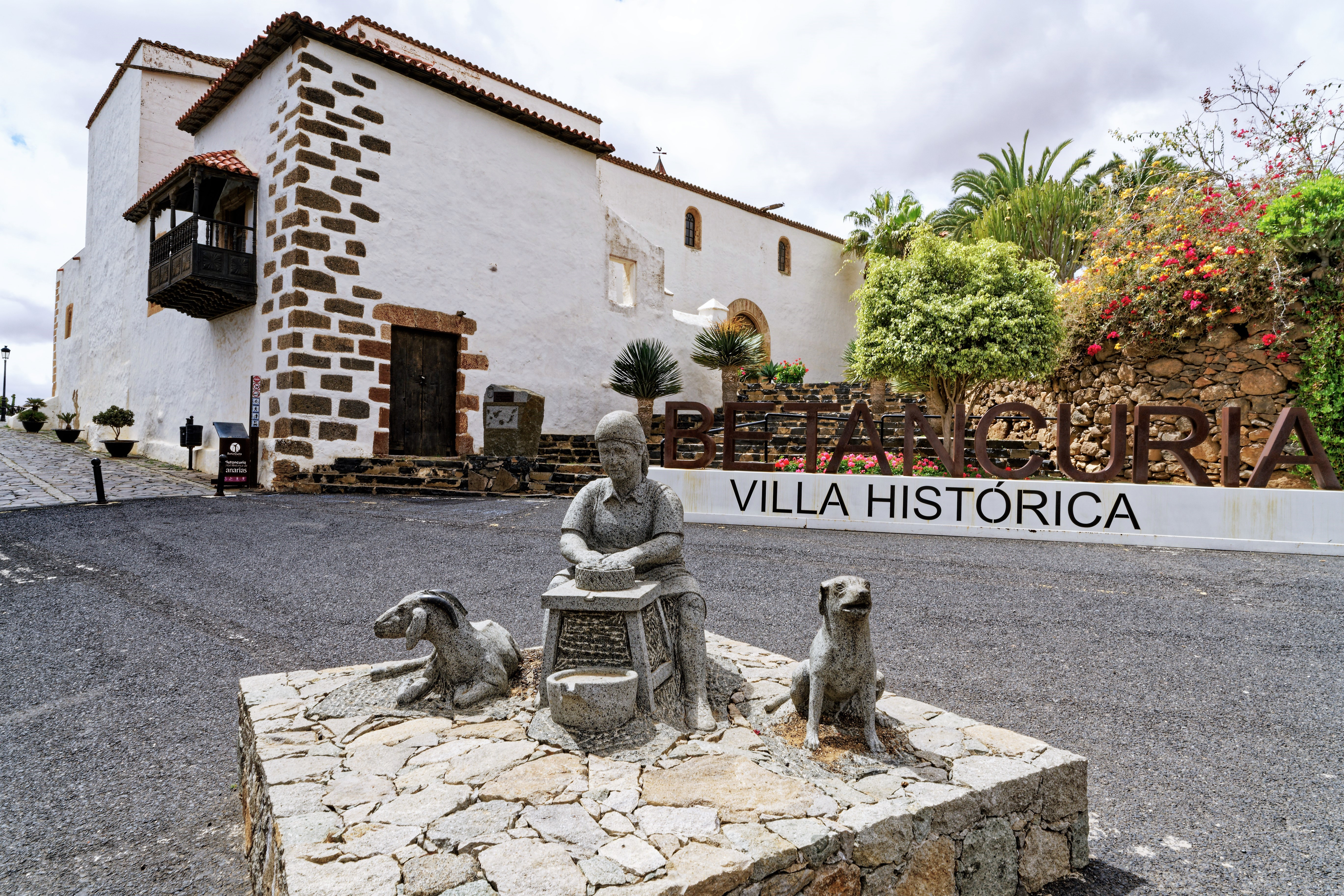

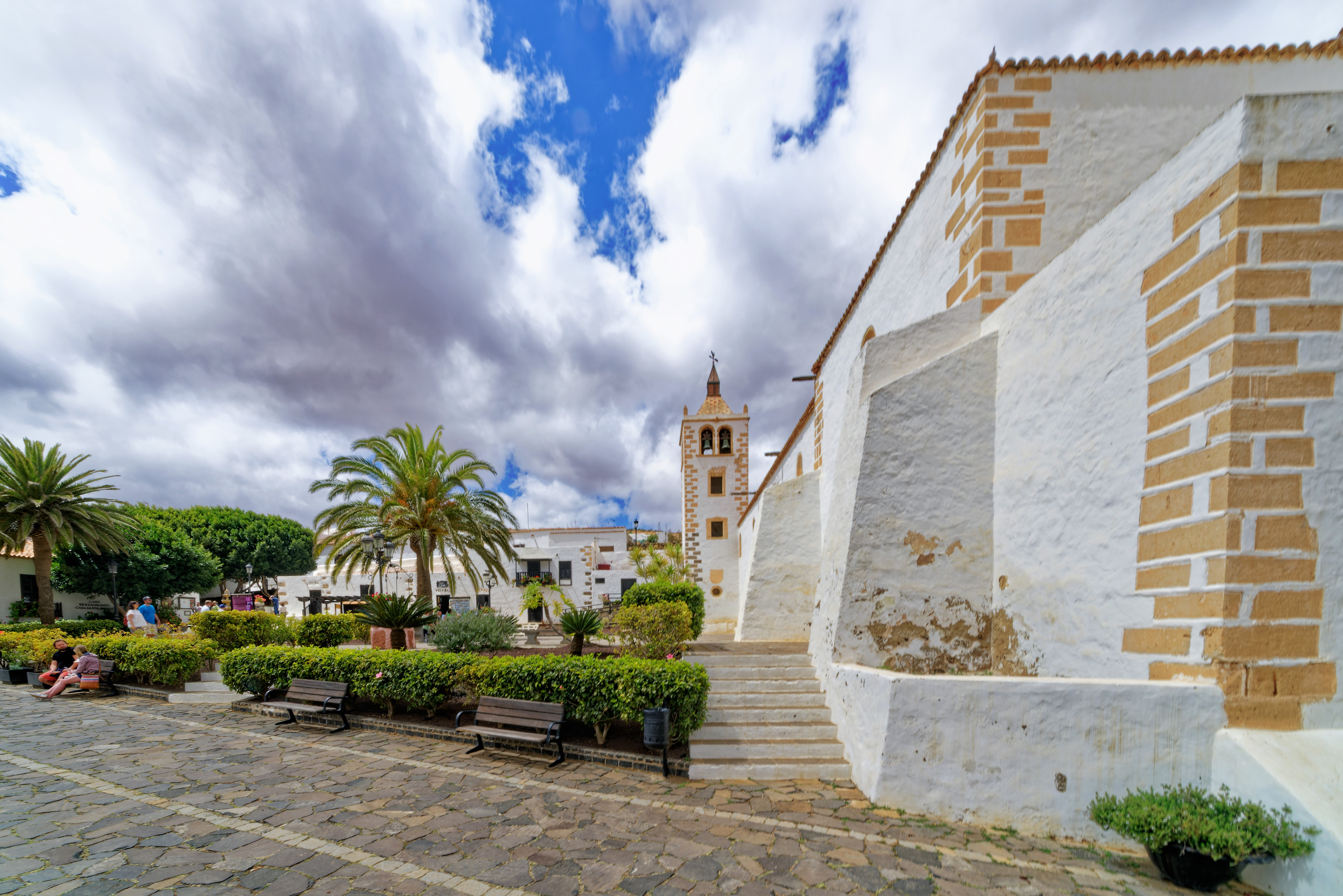

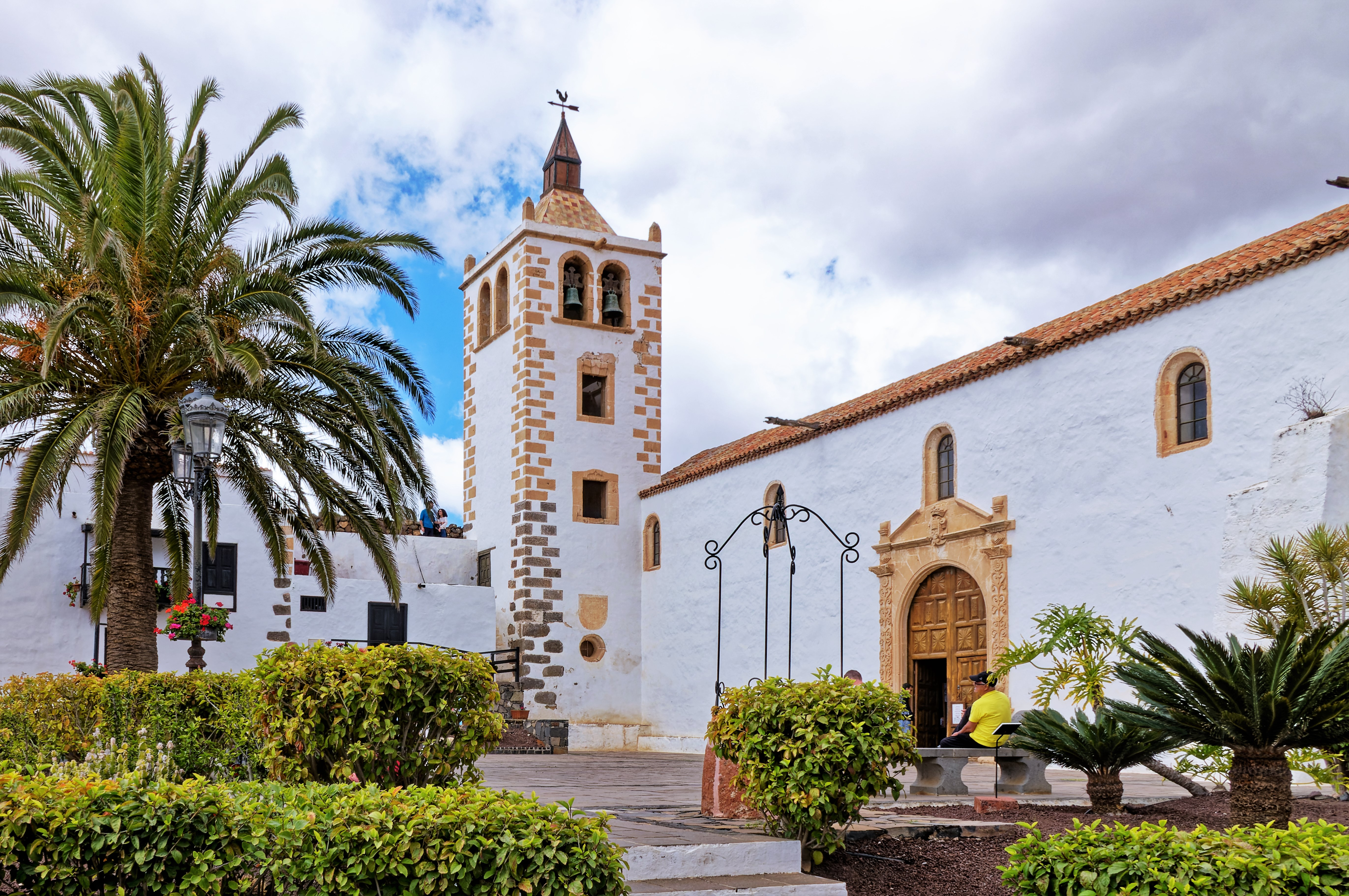

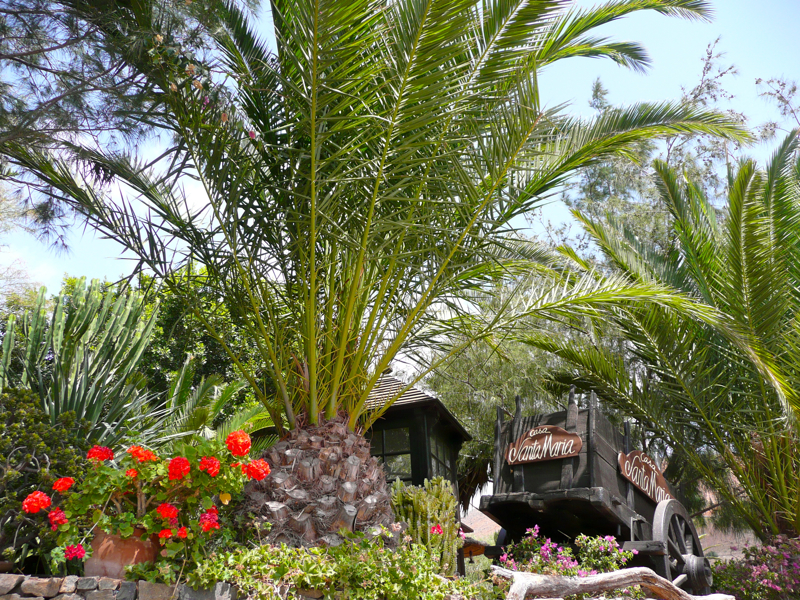

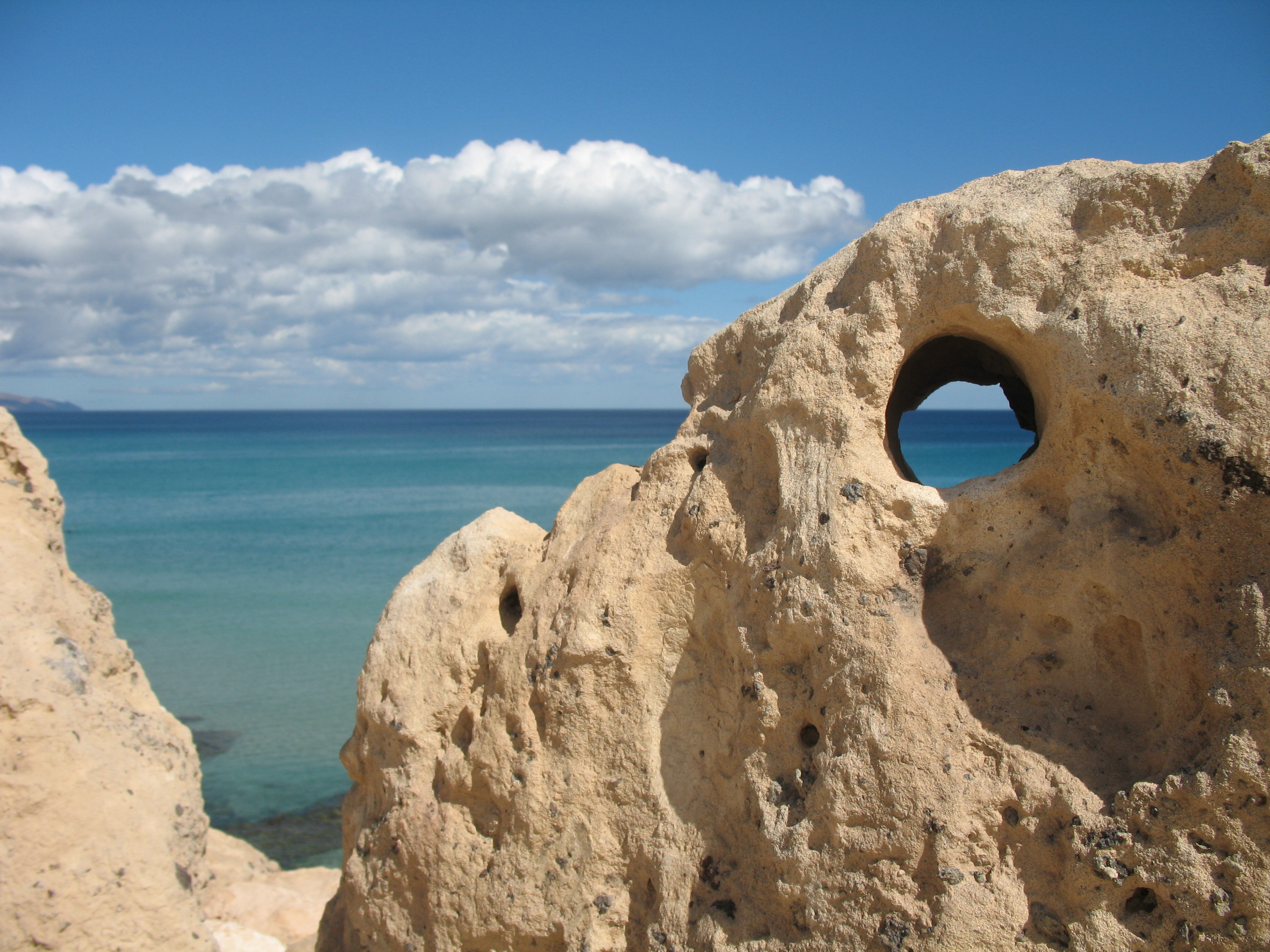

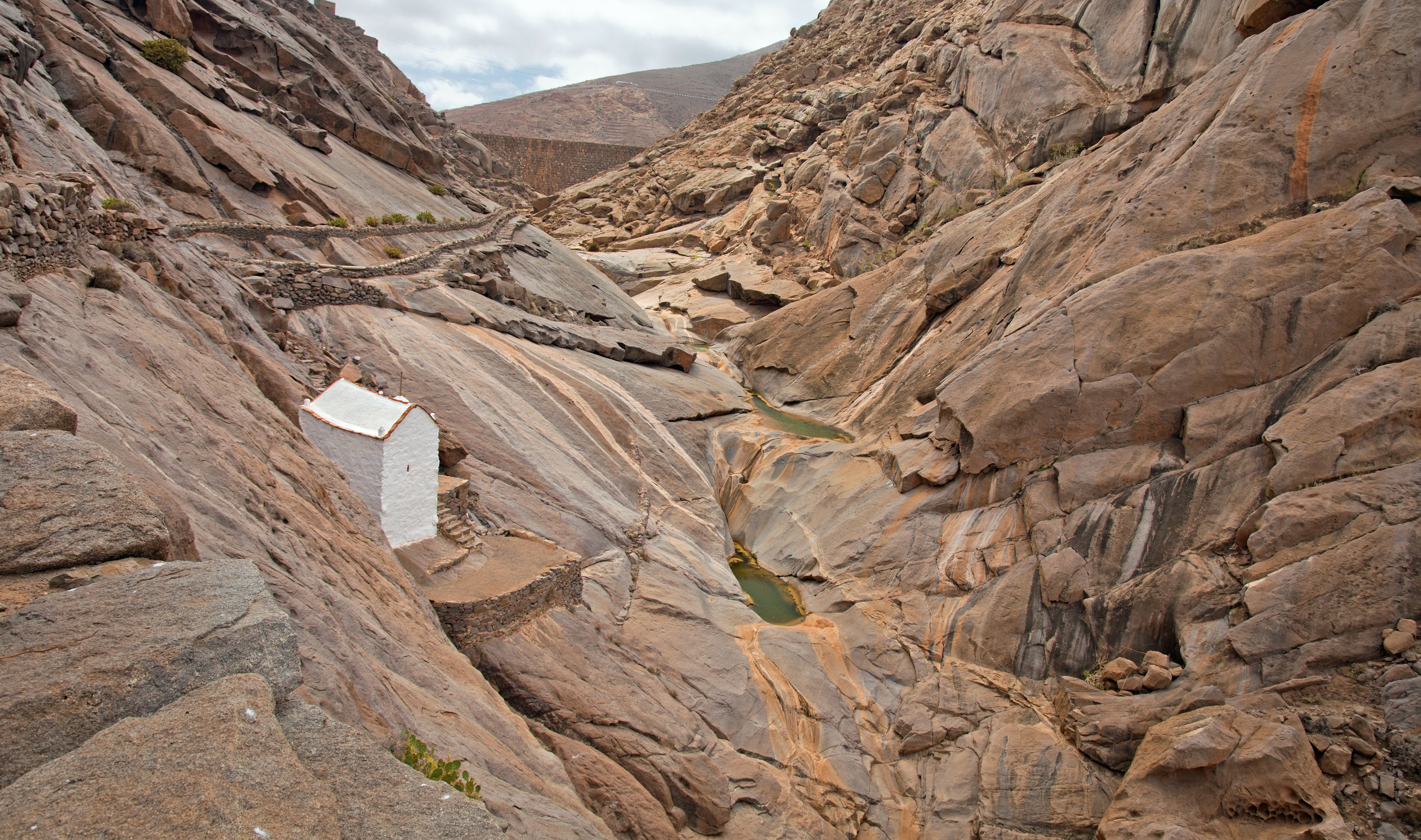

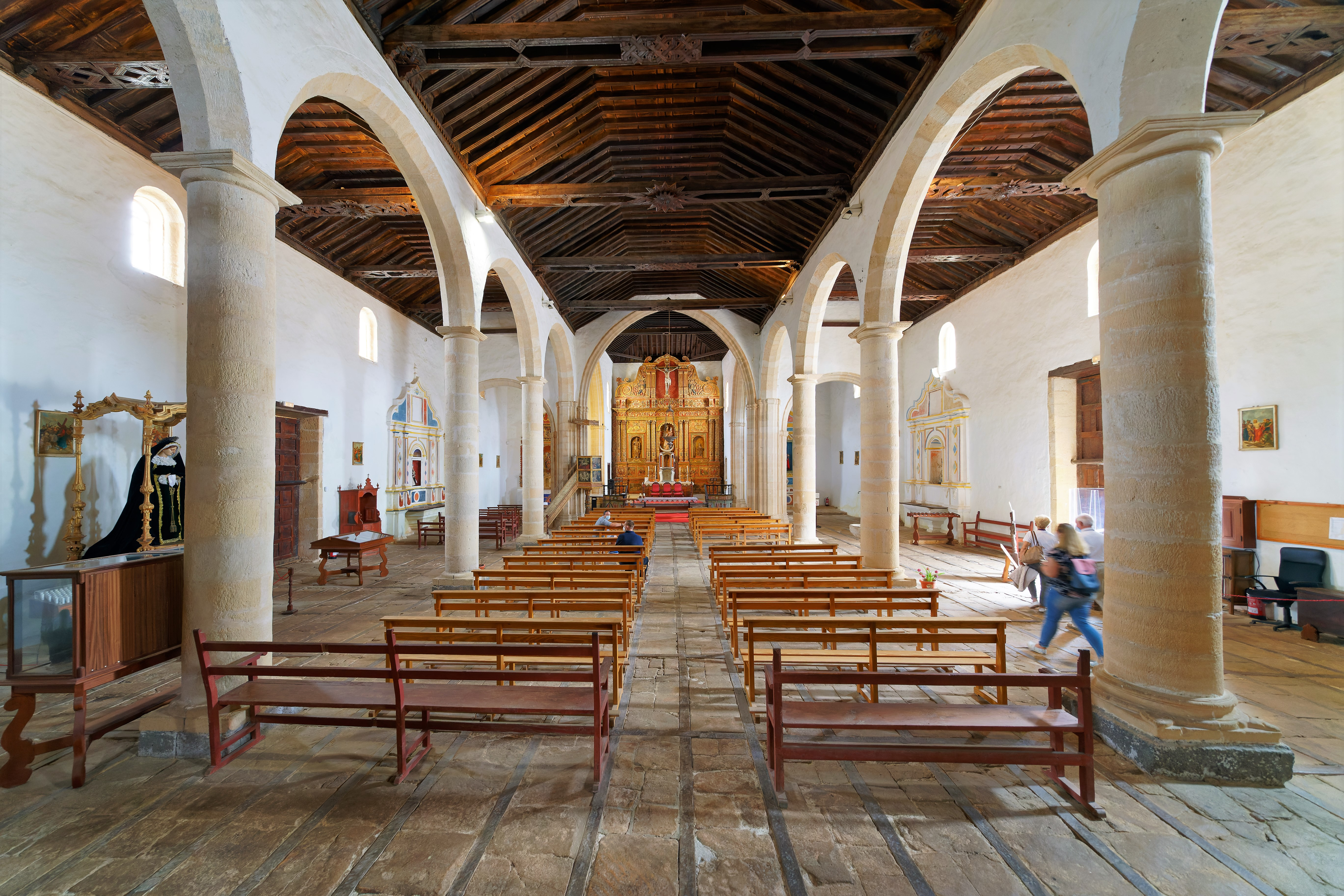

== See also ==
- List of municipalities in Las Palmas
