= Jean de Béthencourt =

French explorer; King of the Canary Islands (1362–1425)

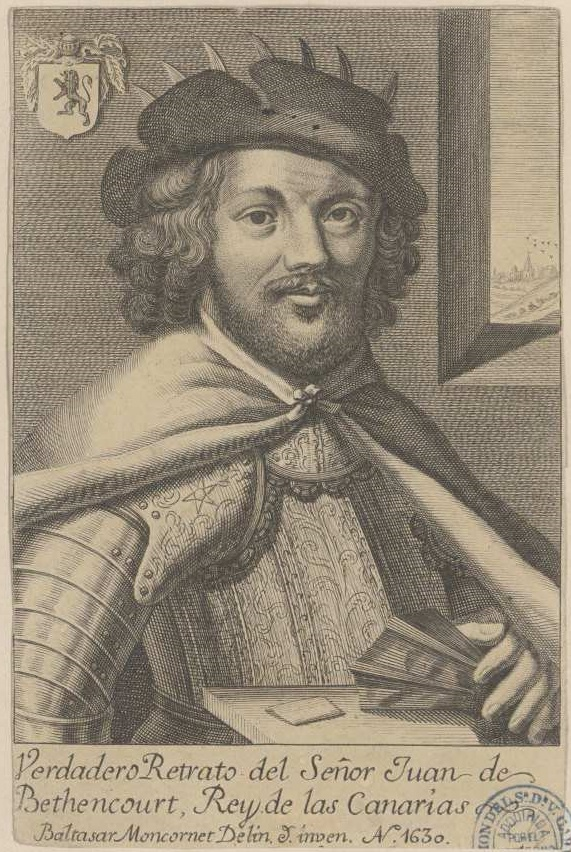
- A later depiction of Jean de Béthencourt.

King of the Canary Islands
- Reign: 1404–1425
- Born: 1362; Grainville-la-Teinturière, Kingdom of France
- Died: 1425 (aged 62–63); Kingdom of France
- Religion: Catholicism

Jean de Béthencourt (French pronunciation: [ʒɑ̃ də betɑ̃kuːʁ]; 1362–1425) was a French explorer who in 1402 led an expedition to the Canary Islands, landing first on the north side of Lanzarote. From there he conquered for Castile the islands of Fuerteventura (1405) and El Hierro, ousting their local chieftains (majos and bimbaches, ancient peoples). Béthencourt received the title Lord of the Canary Islands ("Señor"), named himself King of the Canary Islands, but recognized King Henry III of Castile, who had provided aid during the conquest, as his overlord.

== Background ==
The Canary Islands were apparently known to the Carthaginians of Cádiz. The Roman writer Pliny the Elder called them "the Fortunate Islands". Genoese navigator Lancelotto Malocello is credited with the rediscovery of the Canary Islands in 1312. In 1339, Majorcan Angelino Dulcert drew the first map of the Canaries, labeling one of the islands "Lanzarote".

== Life ==
Jean de Béthencourt, Baron of Saint-Martin-le-Gaillard, was born in Grainville-la-Teinturière, province of Normandy, the son of Jean III Béthencourt and Marie de Bracquemont. During his conflicts with the King of Navarre, King Charles V ordered demolished all fortresses of the region belonging to supporters of Navarre, or those whose owners were unable to ensure their defense. Béthencourt's father was killed in May 1364 at the Battle of Cocherel, serving under Bertrand du Guesclin, and Jean was still a minor. Grainville was demolished in 1365. In 1377, the fifteen-year-old Béthencourt entered the service of Louis I, Duke of Anjou, reaching the position of squire. Between 1387 and 1391 he held the honorary post of chancellor of Louis de Valois and Duke of Touraine (later Duke of Orléans). In 1387, King Charles VI of France gave permission to rebuild the castle in Grainville.

As lord of Grainville, Béthencourt held seven parishes and rights over all the goods that crossed his land. He held Grainville as a vassal of the Count of Longueville, Olivier Du Guesclin, son of Bertrand du Guesclin. He later held it under King Henry V of England who had taken control as a result of his expeditions in France. Around this time, taking advantage of the instability of relations between England and France, it is likely that Béthencourt engaged in piracy against both sides. In 1392, he married in Paris Jeanne de Fayel, the daughter of Guillaume de Fayel and Marguerite de Chatillon.

== Siege of Mahdia ==
In 1390 he accompanied the Duke of Touraine on the Barbary Crusade, an expedition organized by Genoese merchants to address North African piracy. The proposal by the doge was presented as a crusade. As such it would give prestige to its participants, a moratorium on their debts, immunity from lawsuits, and papal indulgence. The French force, consisting of 1,500 knights under the leadership of Louis II, Duke of Bourbon, lay siege to Mahdia in Tunis.

The French were unfamiliar with the terrain, lacked heavy siege equipment, underestimated their enemy, and became embroiled in internal quarrels. The Berbers realized that they could not overcome the heavier armed invaders. Tired of the oppressive heat and concerned about the upcoming winter, the French agreed to a treaty negotiated by the Genoese.

It is likely that Béthencourt heard stories regarding the Canary Islands from the Genoese, and of the presence of orchil, a lichen used to make a rare and expensive dye. Here too, he again met up with Gadifer de la Salle, whom he had known previously during service under the Duke of Orléans, and who would accompany him to the Canaries.

== Expedition to the Canary Islands ==
At that time the Canary Islands were mainly frequented by Spanish merchants. To finance his expedition he sold his house in Paris valued at 200 gold francs and some other small pieces of property in December 1401. His cousin, Robert de Bracquemont, French ambassador to Castile, loaned him 7,000 pounds against a mortgage of Bethencourt's estate. According to Moreri, King Henry III of Castile entrusted the conquest of the Canaries to Braquemont who gave the commission to Béthencourt.

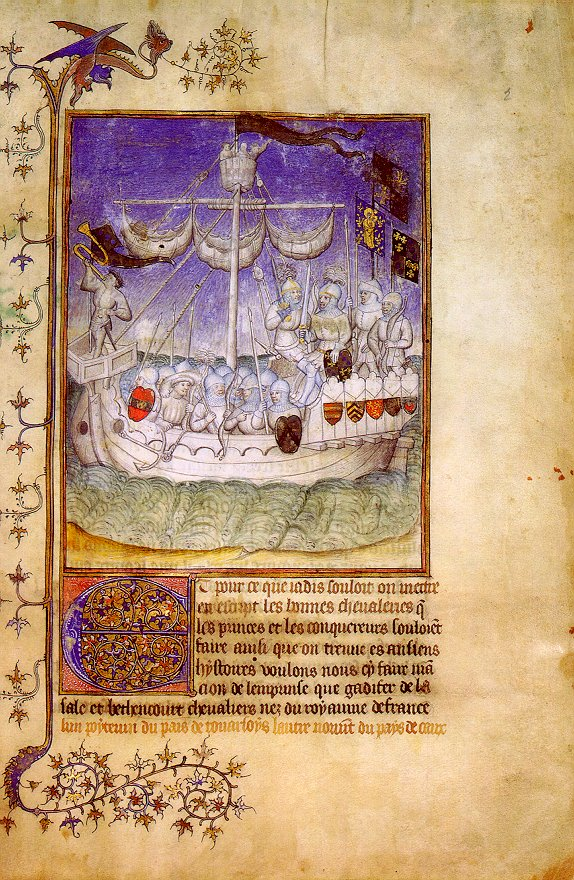
One of the ships departing for the 1402 Norman expedition (from "Le Canarien").

Béthencourt set sail from La Rochelle on 1 May 1402 with eighty men, mostly Gascon and Norman adventurers, including two Franciscan priests (Pierre Bontier and Jean le Verrier who narrated the expedition in Le Canarien), two Guanches who had been captured in an earlier Castilian expedition and were already baptised, and Jean Arriete Prud'homme who would assist in the conquest as a key adviser and administrator.

After passing Cape Finisterre, they put into Cadiz, where he found some of his sailors so frightened that they refused to continue the voyage. Of the eighty crew with which he set out, Béthencourt sailed with fifty-three. He arrived at Lanzarote, the northernmost inhabited island. While Gadifer de la Salle explored the archipelago, Béthencourt left for Cádiz, where he acquired reinforcements at the Castilian court, and was recognized as Lord of the Canary Islands, as a vassal of the King of Castile.

At this time a power struggle had broken out on the island between Gadifer and Berthin de Berneval, another officer. Berthin spread dissention between the Normans of Béthencourt and the Gascons of Gadifer. Local leaders were drawn into the conflict and scores had died in the first months of Béthencourt's absence. During this time, Gadifer had managed to conquer Fuerteventura and to explore other islands. It was only with the return of Béthencourt in 1404 that peace was restored to the troubled island. De la Salle and Béthencourt founded the city of Betancuria (as capital of the island of Fuerteventura) in 1404. A power struggle broke out between the two men, and his lieutenant De la Salle was forced to return to France.

Bethencourt also conquered El Hierro and claimed La Gomera without conquering it. In October 1405, Bethencourt landed on the island of Gran Canaria (canarios), but was defeated by the aboriginals in the battle of Arguineguín in the south of the island and retreated.

Probably in December 1405, Bethencourt sailed back to France, and entrusted his nephew Mateo or Maciot de Béthencourt with the government. He never returned to the Canary Islands, because of the flare-up of the Hundred Years' War in Normandy and financial problems. Other sources put the final return of de Béthencourt to Europe in 1412.

In 1418, he agreed that Maciot de Béthencourt sold the Lordship of the Canary Islands to the Spanish nobleman Enrique Pérez de Guzmán, 2nd Count of Niebla on his behalf. Maciot de Béthencourt remained administrator of the islands.

He died in 1425 and was buried in the church of Grainville-la-Teinturière.

Some of his distant family had great power and fortune in the islands. Including Ginés de Cabrera Béthencourt, famous for building the Casa de Los Coroneles (House Of The Colonels) in the municipal area that would nowadays be known as La Oliva.

Two accounts of the expedition survive in Le Canarien.

== Béthencourt surname ==
To this day, Betancourt and other forms of his surname are quite frequent among Canary Islanders and people of Canary Islander descent, in spite of his death without issue, thanks to the practice of baptising the natives with his surname and to the offspring of his nephew Maciot de Béthencourt who succeeded him as king of the islands.

== See also ==
- Roccella tinctoria
