= Gadifer de la Salle =

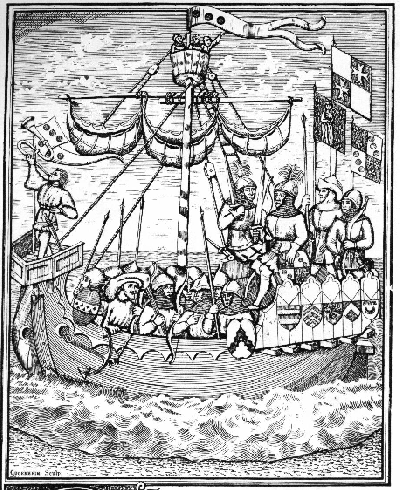
Miniature from the medieval manuscript Le Canarien, depicting Gadifer de La Salle in his ship during the expedition to the Canary Islands in 1402.

Gadifer de La Salle (Sainte-Radegonde, 1340 –1415) was a French knight and crusader of Poitevine origin who, with Jean de Béthencourt, conquered and explored the Canary Islands for the Kingdom of Castile.

== Life ==
Gadifer de La Salle was born about 1350 into a family of minor nobility in Poitou. His father, Ferrand de La Salle. Gadifer served first under Philip I, Duke of Burgundy, and later as a member of the household of the Duke of Berry.

Gadifer had won renown in the French campaigns against England during the Hundred Years' War (1337–1453). In 1378 the duke of Berry financed his travel to Prussia to take part in a crusading venture of the Teutonic Knights in Prussia. He served with Hospitallers in Rhodes, and was part of a delegation sent by Louis I, Duke of Anjou to the Republic of Venice. Their galleys were seized by the Republic of Ragusa, and it is likely that Louis paid Gadifer's ransom.

In 1390 during the Barbary Crusade in North Africa, he was under the command of the Duke of Bourbon at the siege of Mahdia. The expedition had been organized by the Genoese to deal with a pirate stronghold.

While there, he met Jean de Béthencourt, whom he had known previously during service under the Duke of Orleans. Bethencourt later pledged his domain to finance their expedition to the Canary Islands. Gadifer de La Salle joined Béthencourt at La Rochelle.

Accompanying the expedition were Brother Pierre Bontier, a Franciscan friar of Saint-Jouin-de-Marnes who later officiated at Lanzarote, and Jean le Verrier, a priest who was later installed at Fuerteventura as vicar in the chapel of Our Lady of Bethencourt. Bontier and Le Verrier served as historians of the expedition.

In 1402 they conquered Lanzarote, the northernmost inhabited island, from the local guanche chieftains. Gadifer then explored the archipelago, and Béthencourt left for Cádiz, where he was given reinforcements and financial support at the Castilian court. At this time a power struggle had broken out on the island between Gadifer and Berthin, another officer. Berthin wished to abandon the conquest and return with a cargo of slaves. While Gadifer was exploring another island, Berthin departed with almost all of the ships leaving Gadifer for dead. Gadifer and his men spent about a week on the island surviving from dew gathered on their blankets. Eventually a soldier still loyal to Gadifer brought one of the remaining ships to rescue them. In 1403, after a resupply ship sent by Béthencourt arrived, Gadifer was able to complete the conquest of the islands and root out the disloyal Castilians. In early 1404 the native population converted to Christianity, later that same year Béthencourt himself returned. De la Salle and Béthencourt founded the city of Betancuria in 1404.

Béthencourt had become king of the Canaries (a title granted by Henry III of Castile in exchange for Béthencourt's respect). Gadifer, who felt insulted, left the Canaries and appealed for redress at the court of Castile. When this appeal proved to be unsuccessful, he returned to France.
