= Margarita Fernández Guanarteme =

Guanche princess

- Doña
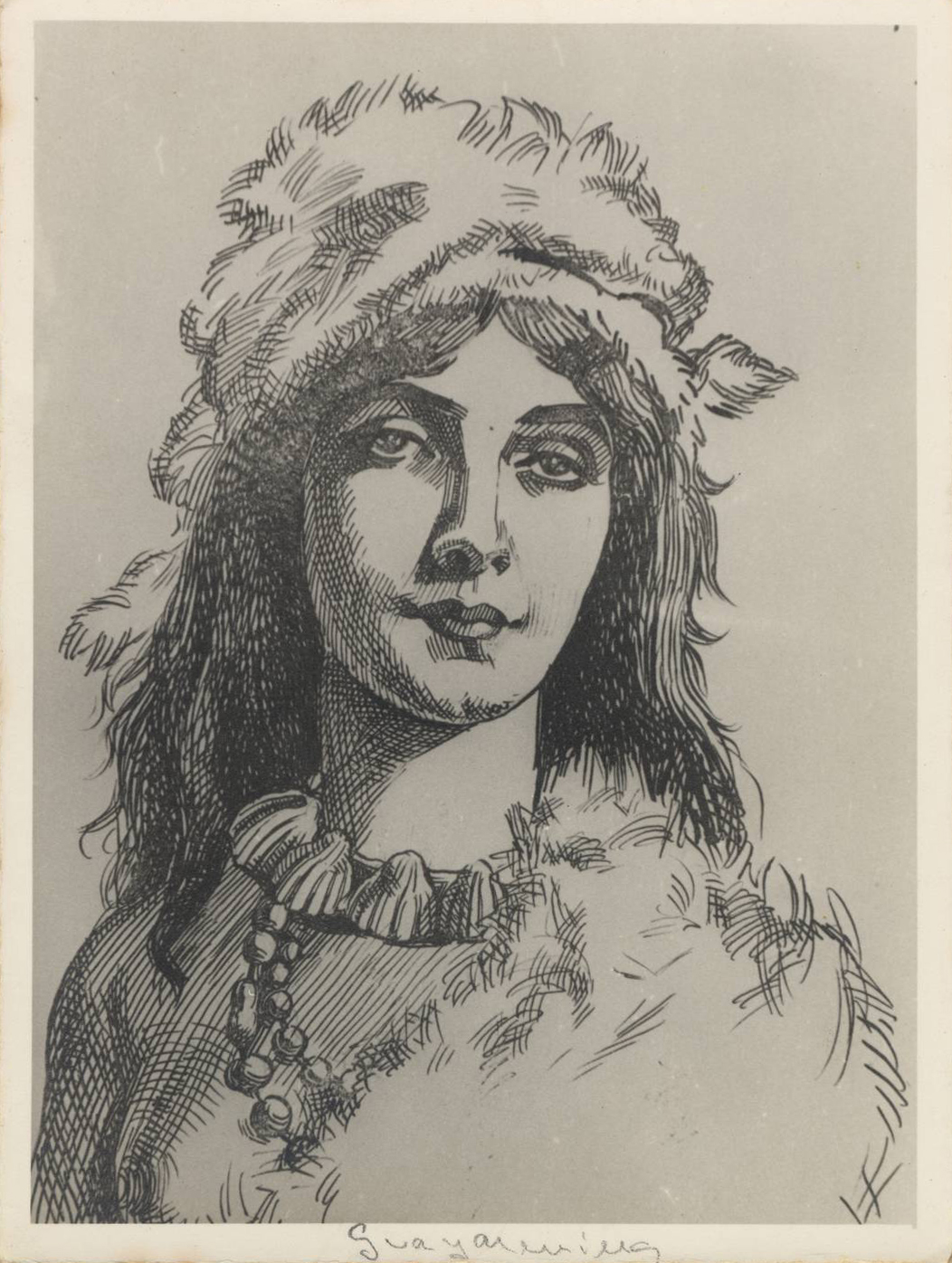
- Sketch of Guayarmina
- Born: Guayarmina c. 1470; Gran Canaria, Canary Islands
- Died: c. 1550; Las Palmas, Gran Canaria, Canary Islands, Crown of Castile
- Miguel de Trejo Carvajal (m. 1486–1537)
- Issue: María, Alonso, Hernán and Bernardino
- Father: Tenesor Semidán
- Mother: Abenchara

Margarita Fernández Guanarteme, also known by her native name Guayarmina (1470-1550), was a Guanche princess, whose family ruled during the time of the conquest of the Canary Islands at the end of the 15th century.

== Name ==
According to the eighteenth-century historian Pedro Agustín del Castillo, Margarita had the aboriginal name of Guayarmina. The philologist Ignacio Reyes translated her native name to signify a "guard, reserve or protection until a prolonged drought", while adding that it also referred figuratively to the star Canopus.

== Biography ==
=== Early life ===
Guayarmina was born on the island of Gran Canaria in the late 1460s or early 1470s. A member of the royal family of the Guanartemato of Gáldar, she was one of the daughters of the guanarteme Tenesor Semidán and his wife Abenchara. There is no further information on her early years.

=== Her life during the Castilian conquest ===
After the capture of Tenesor Semidán by Alonso Fernández de Lugo and Hernán Peraza in 1482, the Guanches moved Guayarmina and her cousin Masequera, daughter of the former king Egonaiga el Bueno and the true holder of power on the island, to the natural fortresses in the interior of the island.

After several clashes in the fortresses of Bentayga, Ajódar and others, the Castilian conquerors under the command of Pedro de Vera, accompanied by Tenesor Semidan - now called Fernando Guanarteme - besieged the natives at Ansite. Following mediation by Guanarteme, the Guanches surrendered on 29 April 1483, handing over the princesses and concluding the conquest of the island.

=== After the conquest ===
After the definitive incorporation of the island into the Crown of Castile, Guayarmina was Christianised and baptised as Margarita Fernández Guanarteme, and settled in the town of Gáldar. Around 1497, she became the heir to the estate of her father, who had died in Tenerife. Among these assets was the property of the valley of Guayedra, which Fernando Guanarteme had received during the repartimiento of the island in 1485.

After the island was conquered, Margarita was married to the Extremaduran nobleman Miguel de Trejo y Carvajal, a native of Granadilla and son of Alonso González Carvajal and his wife Elvira Fernández. From this marriage, they had four children: María de Carvajal, Alonso González Carvajal, Hernán de Trejo and Bernardino de Carvajal.

In 1526, Margarita requested information to prove that she was the daughter of Tenesor Semidán. This documentation, known as the información guanartémica, is one of the most important documents on the conquest.

Tradition has it that Margarita died sometime in the 1540s in the city of Las Palmas.

== Bibliography ==
- Cabrera Déniz, Dolores (1996). Historia versus cine: Tirma o la falsa crónica de la conquista canaria. XI Coloquio de historia canario-americana (in Spanish). Las Palmas de Gran Canaria: Cabildo Insular de Gran Canaria. pp. 451–466. ISBN 84-8103-140-2.
- Castillo, Pedro Agustín del (1848) [1737]. Descripción histórica y geográfica de las islas de Canaria (in Spanish). Santa Cruz de Tenerife: Imprenta Isleña. hdl:20.500.12285/mdcte/233.
- Cebrián Latasa, José Antonio (2003). Ensayo para un diccionario de conquistadores de Canarias (in Spanish). Islas Canarias: Consejería de Educación, Cultura y Deportes del Gobierno de Canarias. ISBN 84-241-5235-2.
- Chil y Naranjo, Gregorio (1899). Gaspar y Roig, Ernest Leroux (ed.). Estudios históricos, climatológicos y patológicos de las Islas Canarias (in Spanish). Vol. III. Las Palmas de Gran Canaria: Imprenta La Atlántida. hdl:20.500.12285/mdcte/3068.
- Lobo Cabrera, Manuel (1980). "Nuevos datos sobre la descendencia de don Fernando Guanarteme". Boletín Millares Carlo (in Spanish) (1). Las Palmas de Gran Canaria: Universidad Nacional de Educación a Distancia: 139–148. hdl:20.500.12285/bolmc/261. ISSN 0211-2140.
- Millares Torres, Agustín (1893). Historia general de las Islas Canarias (in Spanish). Vol. 2. Las Palmas de Gran Canaria: Imprenta de la Verdad de I.
- Morales Padrón, Francisco (1978). Canarias: crónicas de su conquista (in Spanish). Las Palmas de Gran Canaria: Ayuntamiento de Las Palmas de Gran Canaria; El Museo Canario. ISBN 84-500-2951-1.
- Pérez Saavedra, Francisco (1984–1986). "Una matriarca insular. La abuela de Tenesoya". Revista de historia canaria (in Spanish) (175). San Cristóbal de La Laguna: Universidad de La Laguna: 985–1002. ISSN 0213-9472.
- Reyes García, Ignacio (2017). "Guayarmina". Diccionario ínsuloamaziq (in Spanish). Ediciones Tasekenit.
- Rumeu de Armas, Antonio (1965–1966). "Don Fernando Guanarteme y las princesas Guayarmina y Masequera en la corte de los Reyes Católicos". Revista de Historia Canaria (in Spanish). San Cristóbal de La Laguna: Universidad de La Laguna: 149–152, 35–40. hdl:20.500.12285/revhiscan/153. ISSN 0213-9472.
- Santana Rodríguez, Lorenzo; Tabares de Nava y Marín, Leopoldo (2018). Testamentos de canarios, gomeros y herreños (1506-1550) (in Spanish). San Cristóbal de La Laguna: Instituto de Estudios Canarios. ISBN 978-84-09-07854-7.
