= Abenchara =

Guanche queen of the Canary Islands

- Guayarmina
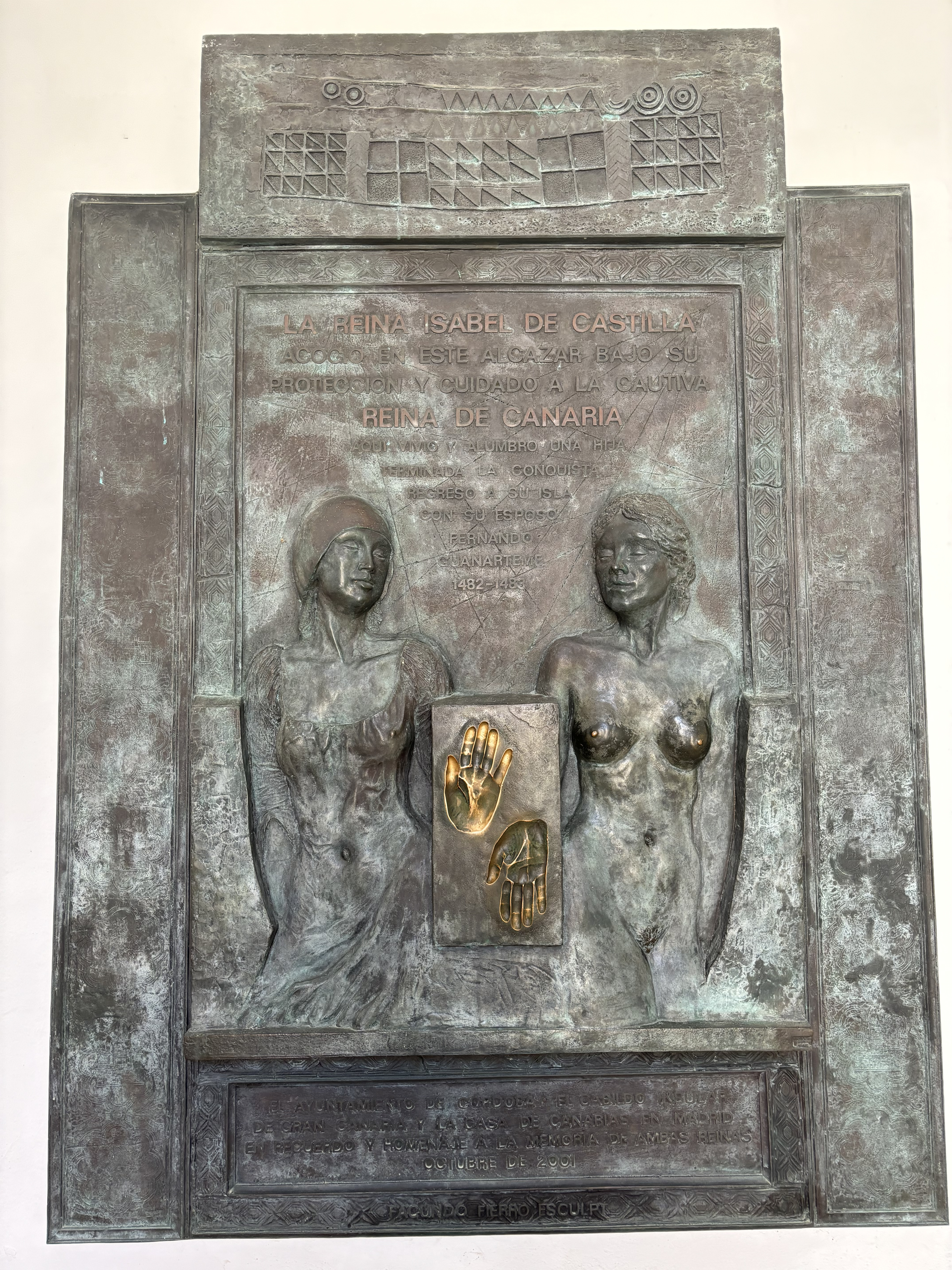
- Abenchara (right) depicted in a sculpture, together with Isabella I of Castile (left)
- Reign: Queen of Gran Canaria
- King: Tenesor Semidán
- Issue: Margarita Fernández Guanarteme; Catalina Fernández Guanarteme
- Father: Chambeneder

Abenchara was an Guanche queen of Gran Canaria. She was the wife of Tenesor Semidán, the king of Gáldar, who ruled at the end of the 15th century during the conquest of the Canary Islands.

== Name ==
Abenchara's native name appears late in historiography, as it is first mentioned in the genealogical work of the Franciscan friar Juan Suárez de Quintana in the 18th century. According to the philologist Ignacio Reyes, it could be translated as "great tear" or "separation". In the 17th century, the chronicler Juan Núñez de la Peña gave her the Christian name Juana, while the genealogist Suárez de Quintana called her Ana.

== Biography ==
Abenchara was the daughter of the faycán Chambeneder. She was taken prisoner by the Castilian captain Pedro de Vera during the conquest of the Canary Islands in the summer of 1482. Her husband, Tenesor Semidán, was captured six months later. Abenchara was taken to the Córdoba, in the Iberian Peninsula, where the Catholic Monarchs were overseeing the conquest of the Emirate of Granada. On 31 August, both received Abenchara, who was pregnant, and entrusted her care to the warden of the Alcázar, Juan de Frías.

The Queen of the Canary Islands was seriously ill due to the vicissitudes of the long journey and her pregnancy, and she was on the verge of death for four weeks. However, she recovered and on 30 September gave birth to a girl named Catalina Fernández Guanarteme. The Catholic Monarchs left the fortress a day later, leaving instructions for the Canary Islander to have everything she needed after the birth. Abenchara remained in the fortress for almost another year, until her husband came to meet her on 15 August 1483, so they could return to the Canary Islands.

They travelled from Córdoba to Seville, where they observed that many Canary Islanders had been banished from the Canaries due to the actions of Pedro de Vera. Fernando. Abenchara asked for favourable treatment and managed to get more than forty of their relatives to return to the islands. It seems that Abenchara was also the mother of Guayarmina, later known as Margarita Fernández Guanarteme.

According to Roberto Hernández Bautista, in his work Los Semidanes en Canarias, Abenchara repudiated her husband and remarried another Christianised Canary Islander named Juan de las Casas, who refused to go to Tenerife for fear of being taken to Castile and fled to the mountains. Pedro de Vera retaliated and enslaved Abenchara for the second time, taking her to Jerez de la Frontera. After some eight years of captivity, her nephew Juan de Guzmán managed to free her, returning to Gran Canaria.

== Memory ==
In October 2001, the sculptor Facundo Fierro, born in Las Palmas de Gran Canaria, inaugurated a monument to the queens Abenchara and Isabel in the Mudejar courtyard of the Alcázar de los Reyes Cristianos in Córdoba, commemorating the meeting between the two monarchs. The initiative was supported by the City Council of Córdoba, the Cabildo Insular de Gran Canaria and the Casa de Canarias in Madrid.

== Bibliography ==
- Morales Farfán, Lourdes (11 July 2012). "Córdoba: El Alcázar de los Reyes Cristianos". una Ventana desde Madrid (in Spanish).
- Reyes García, Ignacio (2017). "Abenchara". Diccionario ínsuloamaziq (in Spanish). Ediciones Tasekenit.
- Rumeu de Armas, Antonio (1983). "El alcalde del Alcázar de Córdoba, Juan de Frías, protector de la Reina de Canaria" (PDF). El Museo Canario (in Spanish) (43): 41–50. ISSN 0211-450X.
