= Moya, Las Palmas =

Moya
- Municipality
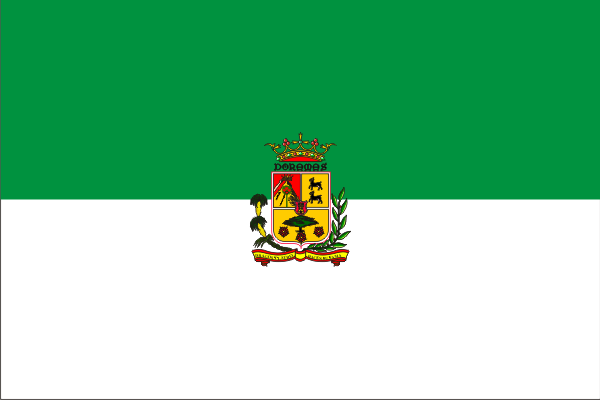
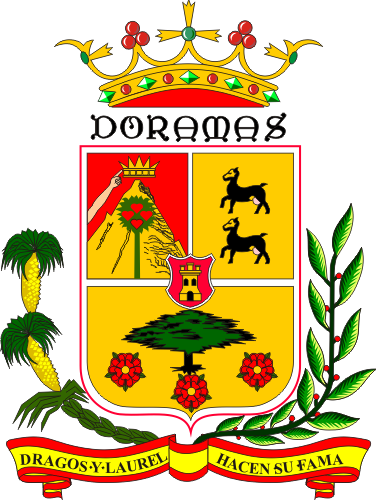
- Flag Coat of arms

- Municipal location in Gran Canaria

- Location in the province of Las Palmas Moya (Canary Islands) Moya (Spain, Canary Islands)
- Coordinates: 28°6′40″N 15°35′0″W
- Country: Spain
- Autonomous Region: Canary Islands
- Province: Las Palmas
- Island: Gran Canaria

Area
  - Total: 31.87 km^{2} (12.31 sq mi)

Population (2025-01-01)
  - Total: 8,007
  - Density: 251.2/km^{2} (650.7/sq mi)
- Time zone: UTC+0 (GMT)

Moya is a town and a municipality in the northern part of the island of Gran Canaria in the Province of Las Palmas in the Canary Islands. Its population is 7,841 (2021), and the area is 31.87 km^{2}, making it one of the smallest municipalities on the island.

The town Moya is situated in the mountains, 4 km from the coast and 15 km west of Las Palmas. The GC-2 motorway passes through the northern part of the municipality.

== Historical population ==
Historical population

Year	Pop.	±%
1950	9,301	—
1960	10,271	+10.4%
1970	8,096	−21.2%
1981	7,516	−7.2%

Year	Pop.	±%
1991	8,007	+6.5%
2001	8,137	+1.6%
2011	8,043	−1.2%
2021	7,841	−2.5%

== History and information ==
The native chief, Doramas, took refuge in the forests around Moya after attacking the Castilian conquerors returning from a raid, the area has since become known as Selva de Doramas or "Doramas' Wood". The town area is surrounded by huge volcanic valleys and is well known for its Neo-Romanesque church, Iglesia de la Virgen de la Candelaria. This impressive structure was completed in 1957 and has a cedar figurine of the Virgen de la Candelaria dating to the 15th century. Moya is the birthplace of the Spanish poet Tomás Morales Castellano. The house Castellano was raised in was converted into a museum in 1976.

The Hermitage of San Bartolomé, built in 1872, is in Fontanales and contains a sculpture of the saint by Canarian sculptor Luján Pérez.

== Protected Areas ==
A large portion of the Moya municipality is included in specially protected areas including the Los Tilos de Moya Special Nature Reserve, which is entirely within the municipality, and the Barranco Oscuro Integral Nature Reserve, which is shared with nearby Valleseco. Doramas National Park has one of the last laurel forests in the Canary Islands.

== See also ==
- List of municipalities in Las Palmas
