= Iglesia de la Virgen de la Candelaria (Moya) =

Iglesia de Nuestra Señora de la Candelaria
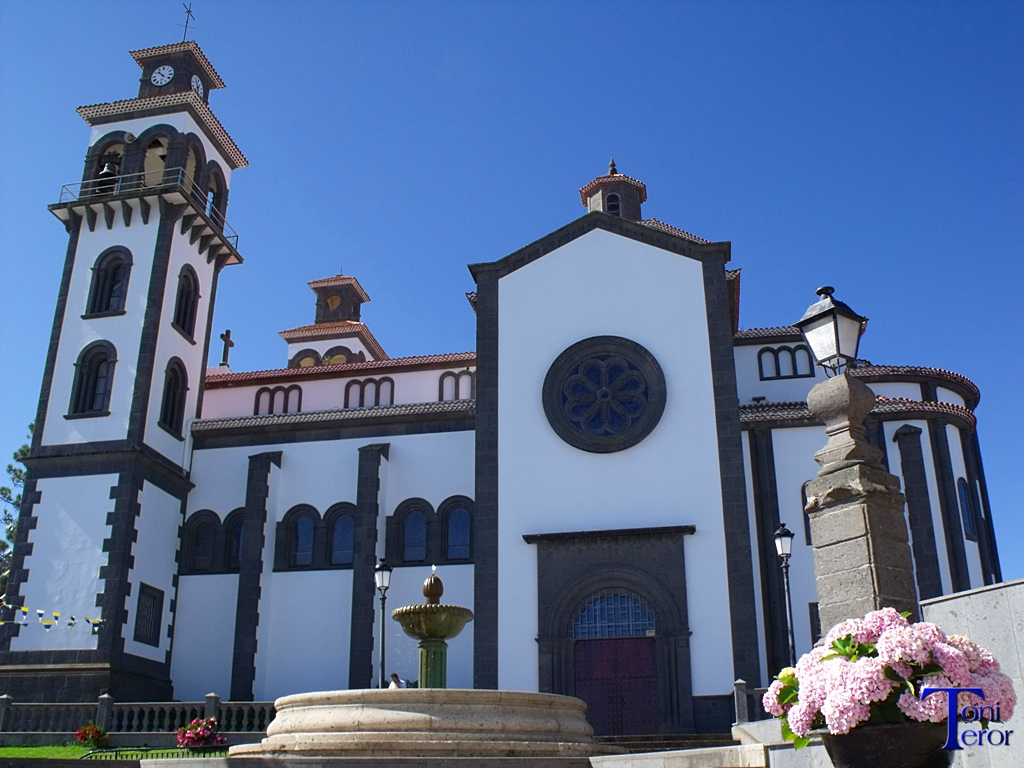
- Iglesia de Nuestra Señora de la Candelaria
- 28.1108°N 15.5842°W
- Location: Moya, Gran Canaria, Canary Islands
- Denomination: Catholic

History
- Dedication: Virgin of Candelaria
- Consecrated: 1957

Architecture
- Architect: Fernando Delgado

Administration
- Diocese: Canarias

The Iglesia de Nuestra Señora de la Candelaria is a church and parish of Moya, Gran Canaria, Canary Islands, Spain. The present church was built on the edge of its barranco, completed in 1957.

== History ==
A simple hermitage at the site of the present church on the edge of the Barranco de Moya is documented in 1495. It had a single nave, and was often enlarged and rebuilt.

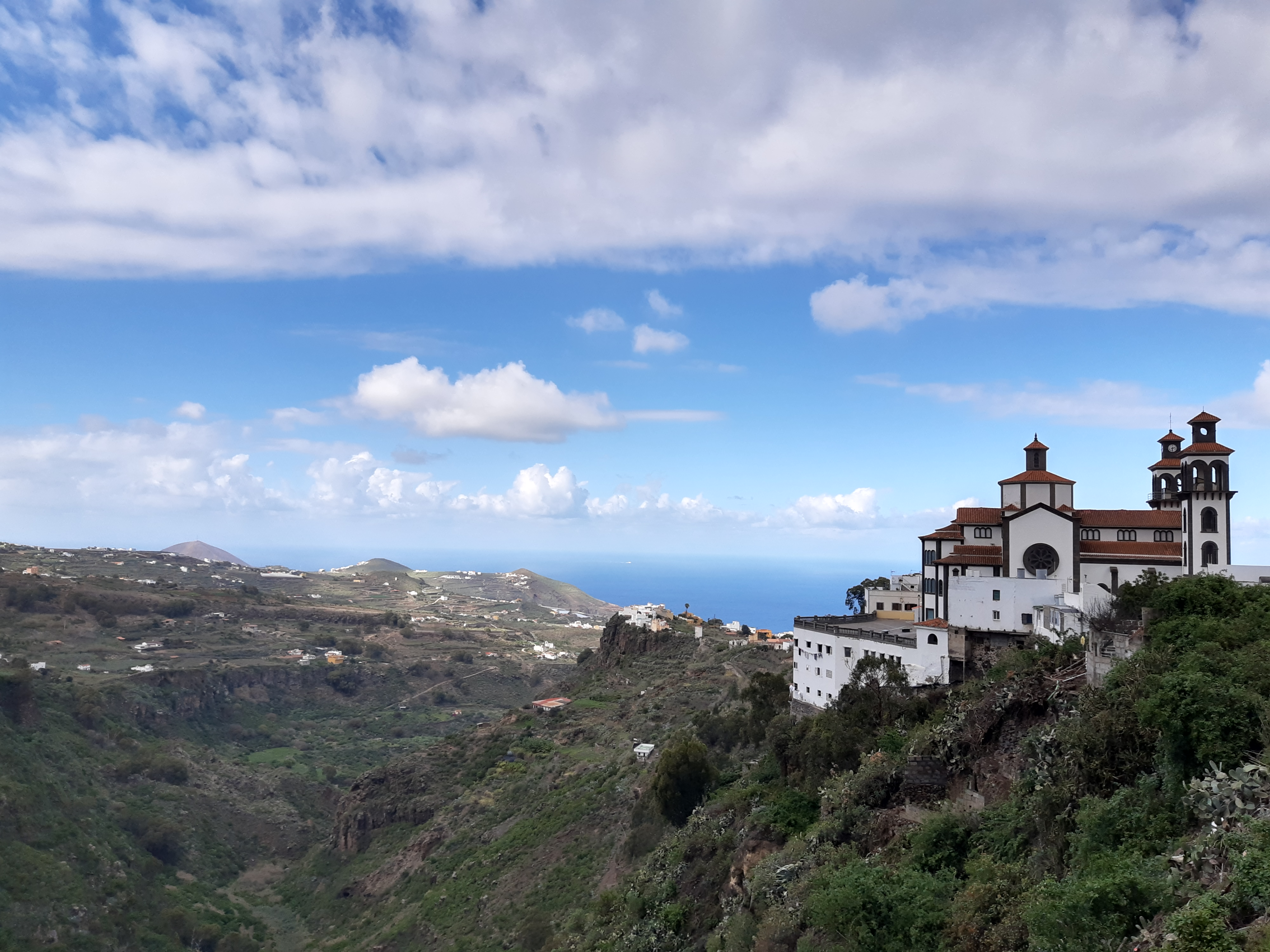
The church on the edge of the Barranco de Moya

The present church was designed by architect Fernando Delgado from Gran Canaria, and built from 1940 to 1957. It is a high vaulted building with three naves. It features many stained glass windows, and sculptures including an anonymous 16th-century Saint Joseph with baby Jesus, two works by José Miguel Luján Pérez, the Sacred Heart and Jude the Apostle. The main attraction is a 15th-century Virgen de la Candelaria (Mary of Candlemas), the patron saint of Moya, made of cedar wood and dressed in clothes.

The principal feasts celebrated in the church are Candlemas on 2 February, and a pilgrimage to San Antonio de Padua on the Saturday closest to the saint's day on 13 June.
