= Church of San Juan Bautista (Arucas) =

Arucas Church
- Church of Saint John the Baptist
- Spanish: Parroquia Matriz de San Juan Bautista
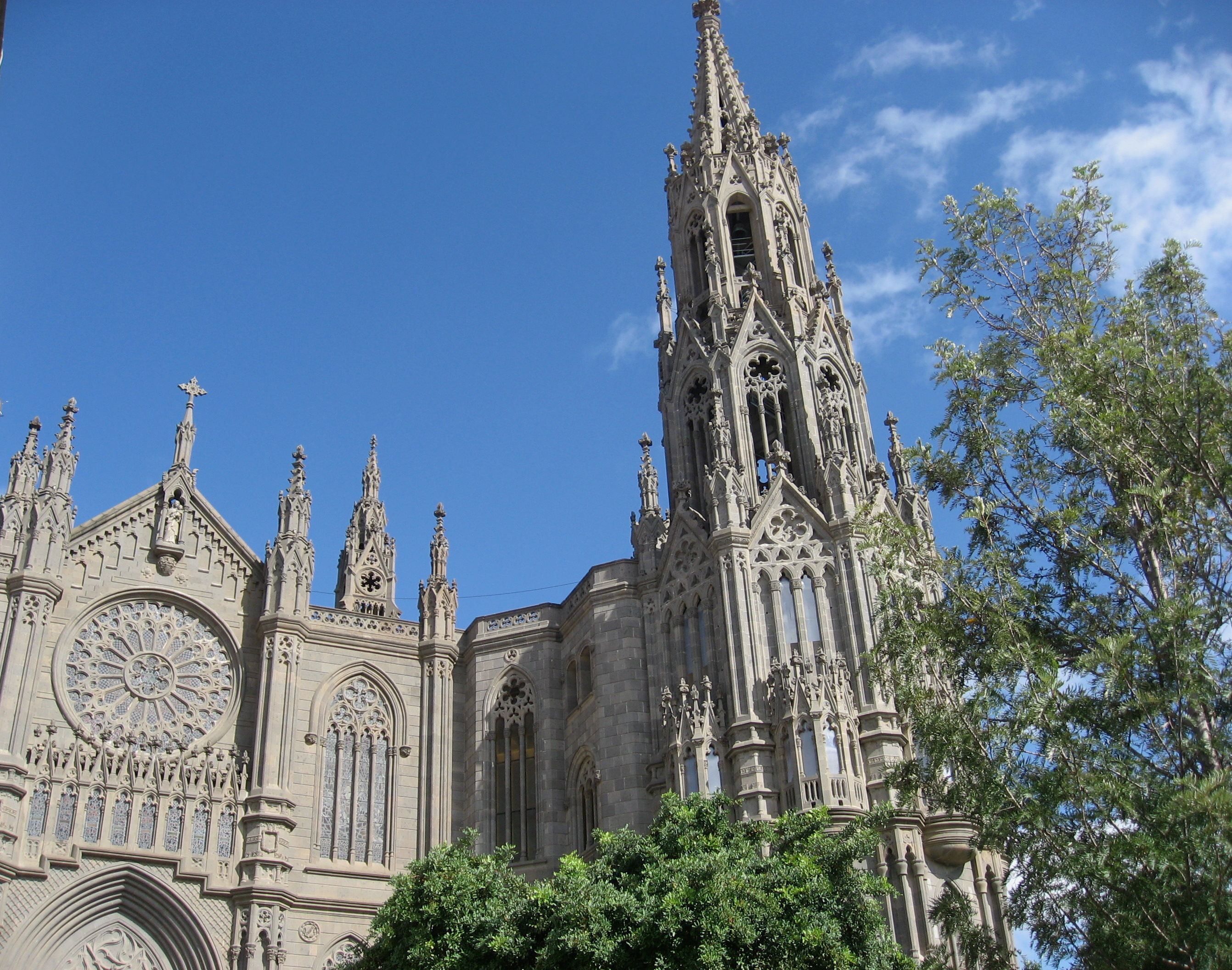
- View of the main church's flank, showing its stonework, rose window, and a steeple

- Location within Canary Islands
- 28°07′07″N 15°31′23″W
- Location: Arucas, Gran Canaria
- Country: Spain
- Denomination: Roman Catholic

History
- Founder: Bishop Fernando Vázquez de Arce
- Dedication: John the Baptist
- Consecrated: 1917

Architecture
- Functional status: Active
- Style: Neo-Gothic
- Years built: 68
- Groundbreaking: 1909
- Completed: 1977

Specifications
- Materials: stone

The Church of San Juan Bautista or Arucas Church, is a Catholic church located in the old town of Arucas, in Gran Canaria, Canary Islands, Spain.

Construction began on 19 March 1909, and took over 68 years. The church was opened for public worship in 1917, but the construction continued until 1977, when the church was completed. Due to the large dimensions, it is usually referred to as The Arucas Cathedral even though it is not a cathedral.
