= Doramas =

15th century Canary Islands warrior

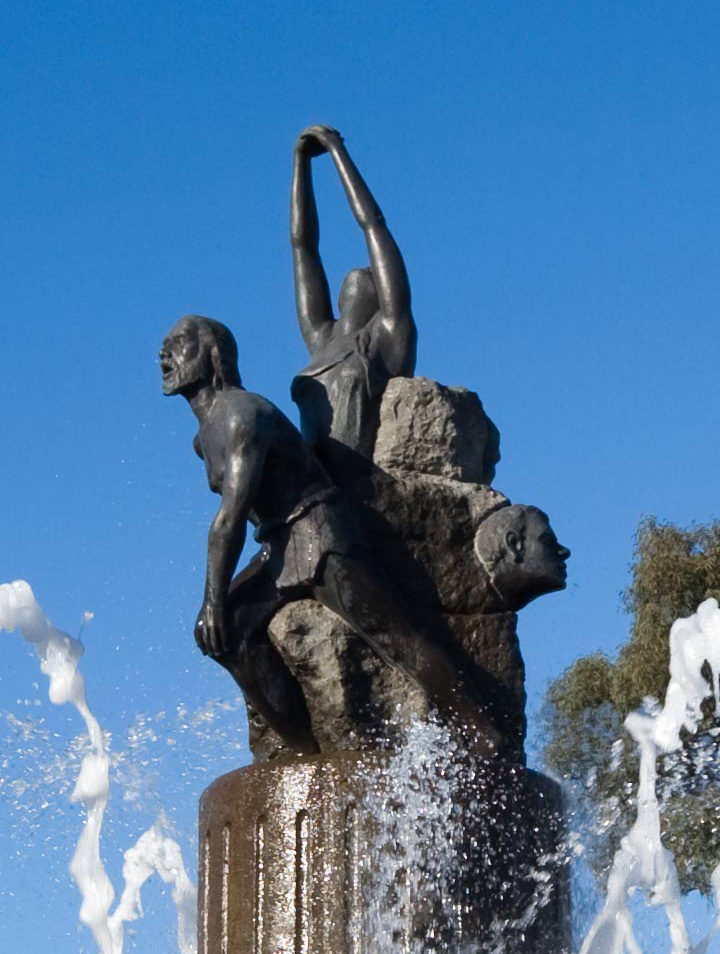

Doramas (also spelled Doramos) was a 15th-century indigenous warrior of the Canary Islands who was a member of the resistance on the island of Gran Canaria. He fought against an invasion by the Crown of Castile in the late 15th century which was undertaken and financed by the Catholic Monarchs.

== Description ==
Originally from the kingdom of Telde, he belonged to the social class of the "axicatnas" (shorn ones). They had to wear their hair short, unlike the nobles who wore their hair long and enjoyed other privileges. The name of Doramas appears to be a nickname, meaning "he of the wide noses."

With a wide back, and medium stature, Doramas was known for his dexterity in combat and his capacity for leadership. In battle, he carried a large wooden sword and was described as having a shield made from drago wood, which was black, white, and colored, separated into four sections.

== Military exploits ==
Doramas participated actively in the defense of the island when Castille began its conquest in 1478. He was named a noble by the Guanarteme (the name for the king) and he moved to the kingdom of Gáldar, on the northern part of the island. At the time, the island of Gran Canaria was divided into two kingdoms, Telde in the south and Gáldar in the north. He led a detachment situated in the northern zone that offered great resistance to the invasion at Mount Doramas, which carries his name in honor to this day. He reaped great success as the head of the Canary army, and it turned him into a charismatic leader in the aborigine resistance.

Because of the great fame that Doramas won in the war, the Castilian captain began a decisive campaign against him personally, attacking him on his home turf. On August 20, 1481, while engaged in a bruising battle in the region of Arucas, Doramas fell victim to a lance-wound and died. His severed head was exhibited in the city of Las Palmas as a warning to the population. The Battle of Arucas ended on November 30, 1481, between the warriors and the troops of Pedro de Vera. Subsequently, Grand Canary was incorporated into the Crown of Castille on April 29, 1483.

Since the war, the baptisms of descendants of certain nobles have included a ceremony in which they are conferred another name in memory of their Canary origin. Descendants of Doramas have been given the surname "Oramas" or "Orama", one of the few of true Canary origin that survive into the present day.

== Works cited ==
- Abreu Galindo, Juan de (1848). Historia de la conquista de las siete islas de Gran Canaria (in Spanish). Santa Cruz de Tenerife: Imprenta, Litografía y Librería Isleña.
- Gómez Escudero, Pedro (1936). Historia de la conquista de la Gran Canaria (in Spanish). Gáldar: El Norte.
