= Pedro de Vera =

Castilian nobleman and Conquistador

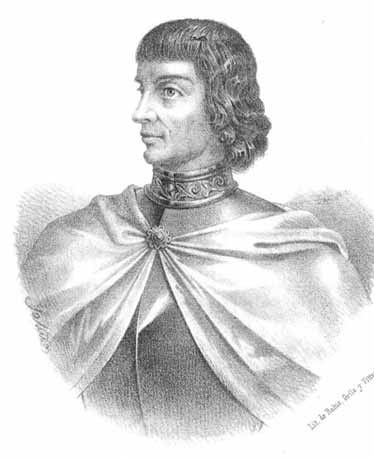
19th century portrait of Pedro de Vera y Mendoza

Pedro de Vera Mendoza (Jerez de la Frontera, c. 1430 - Jerez de la Frontera, July 1505) was a Castilian nobleman and Conquistador who completed the conquest of the island of Gran Canaria in the Canary Islands for the Crown of Castile and who brutally put down the rebellion in La Gomera at the end of the 15th century.

== Biography ==
Pedro de Vera held numerous important positions during the reigns of both Henry IV of Castile and the Catholic Monarchs, the main ones being those of Warden (Alcaide) of several Andalusian towns, as well as those of Mayor of his native Jerez. In the War of the Castilian Succession, he fought on the side of the Marquis of Cadiz against the Duke of Medina Sidonia.

=== Conquest of Gran Canaria ===
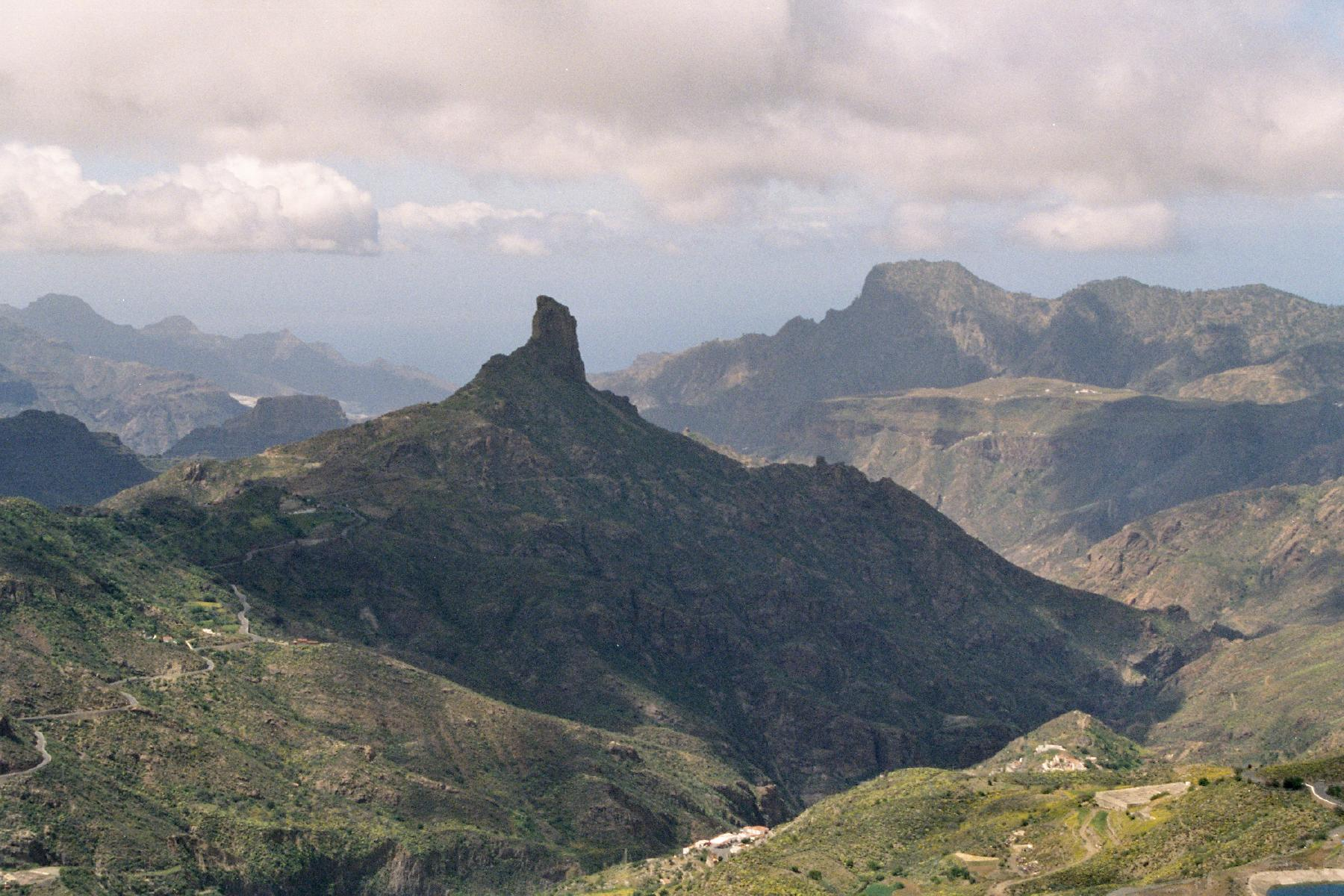
Roque Bentayga, last holdout of the Guanches of Gran Canaria.

On 4 February 1480, the Catholic Monarchs appointed Pedro de Vera Governor of Gran Canaria, in an attempt to give a new impetus to the conquest, which had been hampered by aborigine resistance and by infighting between the Conquistadors.

Pedro de Vera and his troops arrived in Gran Canaria on 18 August and he took possession of his post as Governor. One of his first measures was to arrest Captain Juan Rejón and send him to Spain to be tried for the execution of the previous Governor Pedro del Algaba, which had occurred on 20 May 1480, shortly before Vera's arrival.

In May 1481, Vera accepted the surrender of several leading Aborigines and in August, after receiving fresh troops from the peninsula, Vera entered the northwest of the island, presenting battle to the Aborigines near Arucas. During this confrontation, the Canarian leader Doramas, considered the most warlike of the Aborigines, was killed, which made it possible for the northern route to be cleared. Vera then sent Alonso Fernández de Lugo to build a tower in the valley of Agaete to continue putting pressure on the Aborigines.

In 1482 Alonso de Lugo and Hernán Peraza managed to capture the Guanarteme (leader) of Gáldar, Tenesor Semidán, who after being baptized, collaborated with Vera, attracting many of his former vassals to cooperate with the Spanish.

At the beginning of 1483, Vera decided to launch his final offensive. His troops entered the interior of the island, besieging the Canarians at the Roque Bentayga, Ajódar and Ansite, where most of the rebels took refuge around the new Guanarteme Bentejuí, Princess Guayarmina and the High priest of Telde. Finally, on 29 April 1483, the Canarians handed over Princess Guayarmina, true heir to the Kingdom of the island, to Pedro de Vera after Bentejuí's suicide, thus concluding the conquest of the island.

Pedro de Vera was Governor of Gran Canaria from 4 February 1480 to 30 March 1491, when he was dismissed from office by the Catholic Monarchs for not having successfully completed the repopulation of the island. During this period, Pedro de Vera returned at least twice to Spain, where he participated in the Granada War.

=== Interventions in La Gomera ===
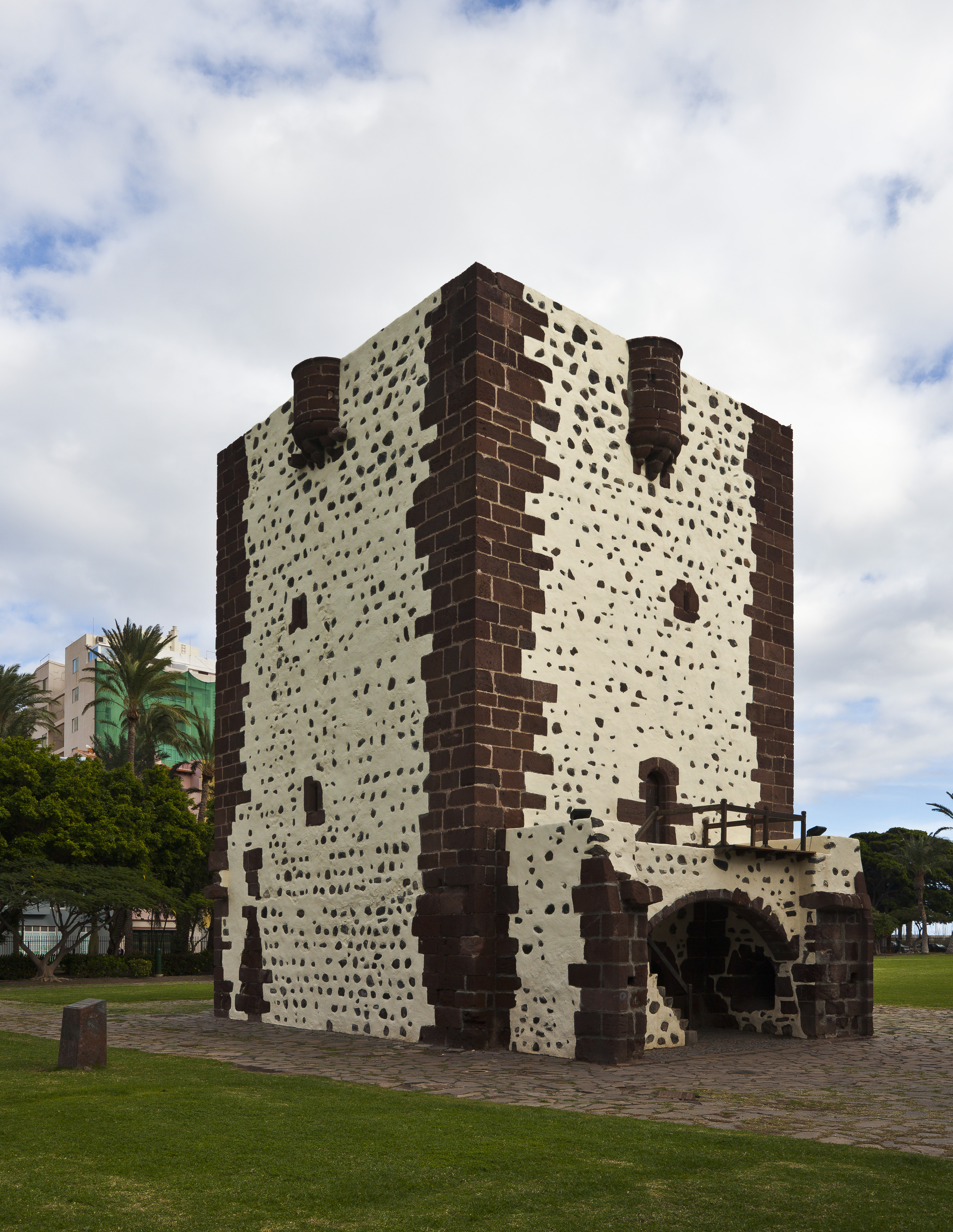
Torre del Conde, where Pedro de Vera executed the rebels from La Gomera in 1489.

Pedro de Vera travelled a first time to the island of La Gomera around 1484 or 1486 with 100 men, to help Hernan Peraza the Younger, Lord of the island, who was besieged in his tower of San Sebastián by the Gomeros. The natives were defeated and retaliated against.

In 1488, the so-called "Gomero rebellion" broke out in which the Gomeros killed Hernán Peraza the Younger. Pedro de Vera returned to La Gomera to help Beatriz de Bobadilla, Peraza's widow. He landed with 400 men and broke the siege of the tower, with the rebels of La Gomera fleeing inland. As revenge for Peraza's murder, Pedro de Vera ordered the hanging of all male Gomeros from the Ipalan and Mulagua factions, which were directly involved in Peraza's murder, and the exile and enslavement of the men from the other two factions on the island - Orone and Agana - as well as the women and children of all four factions.

The harsh repression of Vera and the sale as slaves even of converted Gomeros, was denounced before the Kings by the Bishop of the Canary Islands, Fray Miguel López de la Serna, initiating a trial against the Governor of Gran Canaria, which resulted in Vera having to pay the price of the Gomeros unjustly sold.

Pedro de Vera also organized several raids against Tenerife between 1484 and 1490, which would pave the way for the conquest of Tenerife by the Andalusian captain Alonso Fernández de Lugo a few years later.

In 1491, Pedro de Vera returned to Spain for good and died in 1505.
He had married twice and had 8 children. One of his sons, Francisco, was the father of Alvar Núñez Cabeza de Vaca, a Conquistador in the Americas.

== See also ==
- Conquest of the Canary Islands

== Sources ==
- Gambín García, Mariano (2003). "Cinco documentos inéditos sobre Pedro de Vera, conquistador y gobernador de Gran Canaria" (PDF). El Museo Canario (58). Las Palmas de Gran Canaria: El Museo Canario: 189–210. ISSN 0211-450X.
- Morales Padrón, Francisco (1978). Canarias: crónicas de su conquista. Las Palmas de Gran Canaria: Ayuntamiento de Las Palmas de Gran Canaria; El Museo Canario. ISBN 84-500-2951-1. Archived from the original on 2019-04-15.
- Álvarez Delgado, Juan (1959). "El episodio de Iballa". Anuario de Estudios Atlánticos (5). Las Palmas de Gran Canaria: Patronato de la Casa de Colón: 255–374. ISSN 0570-4065.
