= Arucas, Las Palmas =

Arucas
- Municipality
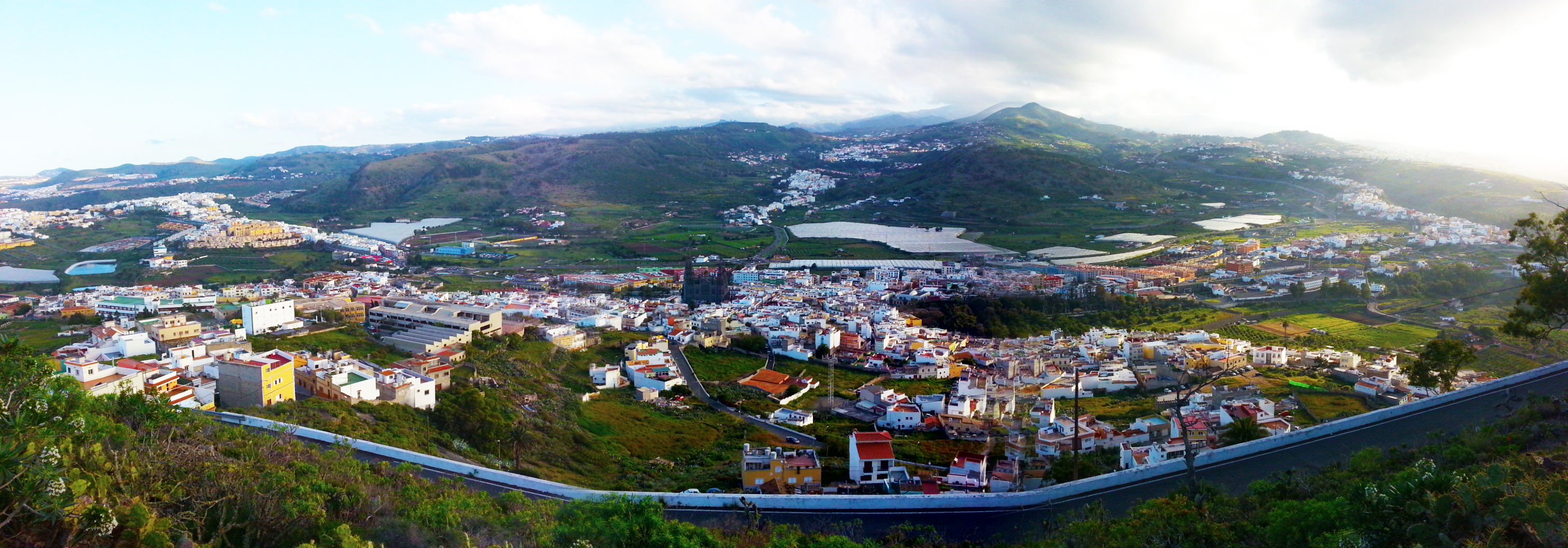

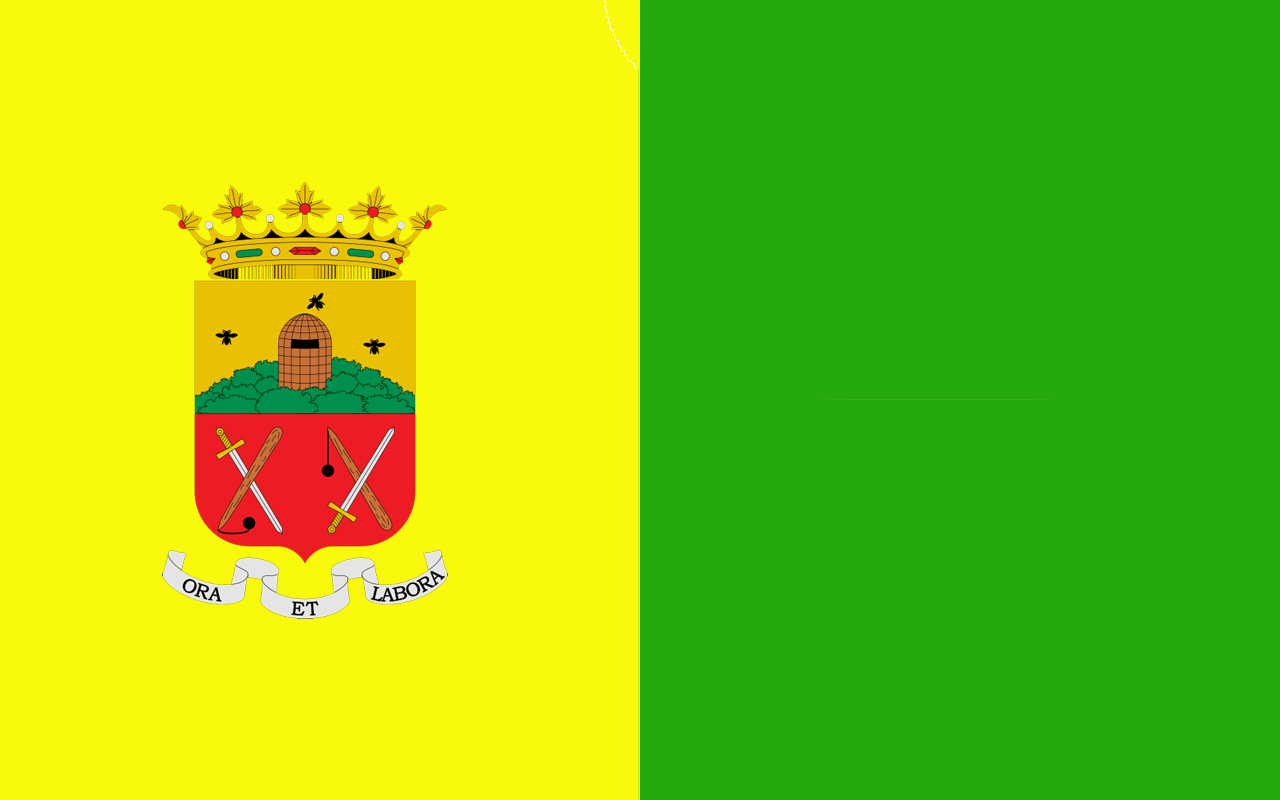
- Flag Coat of arms

- Municipal location in Gran Canaria

- Location in the province of Las Palmas Arucas (Canary Islands) Arucas (Spain, Canary Islands)
- Coordinates: 28°07′08″N 15°31′23″W
- Country: Spain
- Autonomous region: Canary Islands
- Province: Las Palmas
- Island: Gran Canaria

Area
  - Total: 33.01 km^{2} (12.75 sq mi)
- Elevation: 240 m (790 ft)

Population (2025-01-01)
  - Total: 39,232
  - Density: 1,188/km^{2} (3,078/sq mi)
- Municipal code: E-35006

Arucas is a municipality in the northern part of the island of Gran Canaria, province of Las Palmas, Canary Islands. Arucas borders Las Palmas to the west and is part of its urban area. Its population is 36,852 (2013), and the area is 33.01 km^{2} (12.75 sq mi). The GC-2 motorway passes north of the town.

== Sites of interest ==
The Church of San Juan Bautista is the leading architectural and social monument in the municipality. It was built entirely in Arucas stone by local master masons, and it dates from 1909. Apart from the wealth of the carved stone columns and column heads, there are also some beautiful stained glass windows, the works of Canary Island painter Cristobal Hernandez de Quintana, and an extraordinary carving of the Reclining Christ, by Manuel Ramos. To the north is the Montaña de Arucas which is thought to be the area where courageous Doramas the Guanche leader was killed in 1481 by Pedro de Vera in the Battle of Arucas. Arucas is known for the production of rum.

== History ==
Arucas was rebuilt in 1480 after being completely destroyed in 1478. Since the 15th century, the main crop of the Arucas area was sugar cane. Rum was produced here long before sugar plantations were cultivated in Cuba. One of the main features of modern-day Arucas is its rum factory. Arucas boomed with the demand for cochineal (a beetle feeding off cactus pear, crushed to produce red dye) in the second half of the 19th century.

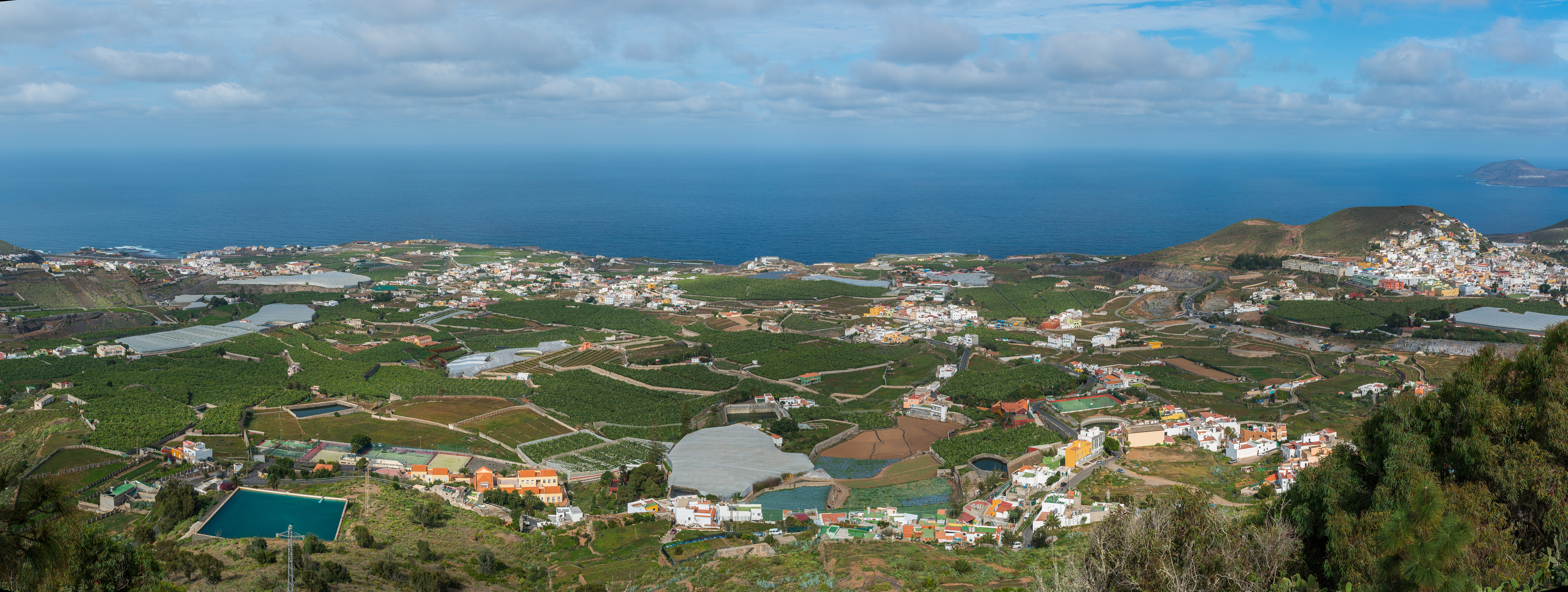
Arucas 2016

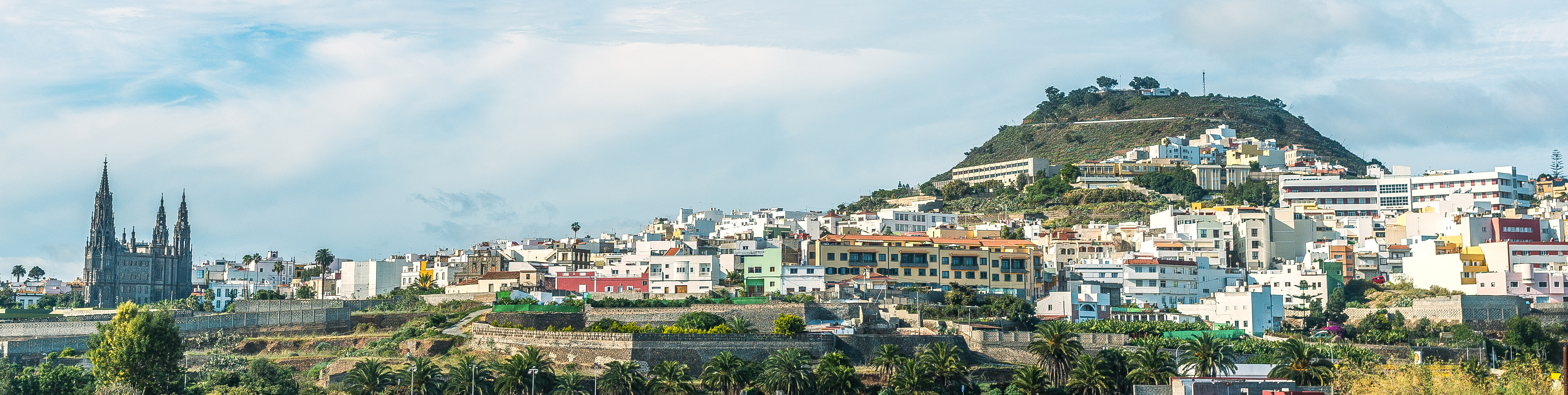
Arucas 2016

Historical population
Year	Pop.	±%
1991	26,974	—
1996	29,179	+8.2%
2001	32,466	+11.3%
2002	32,917	+1.4%
2003	33,449	+1.6%
2004	33,701	+0.8%
2013	36,852	+9.3%

== Gallery ==
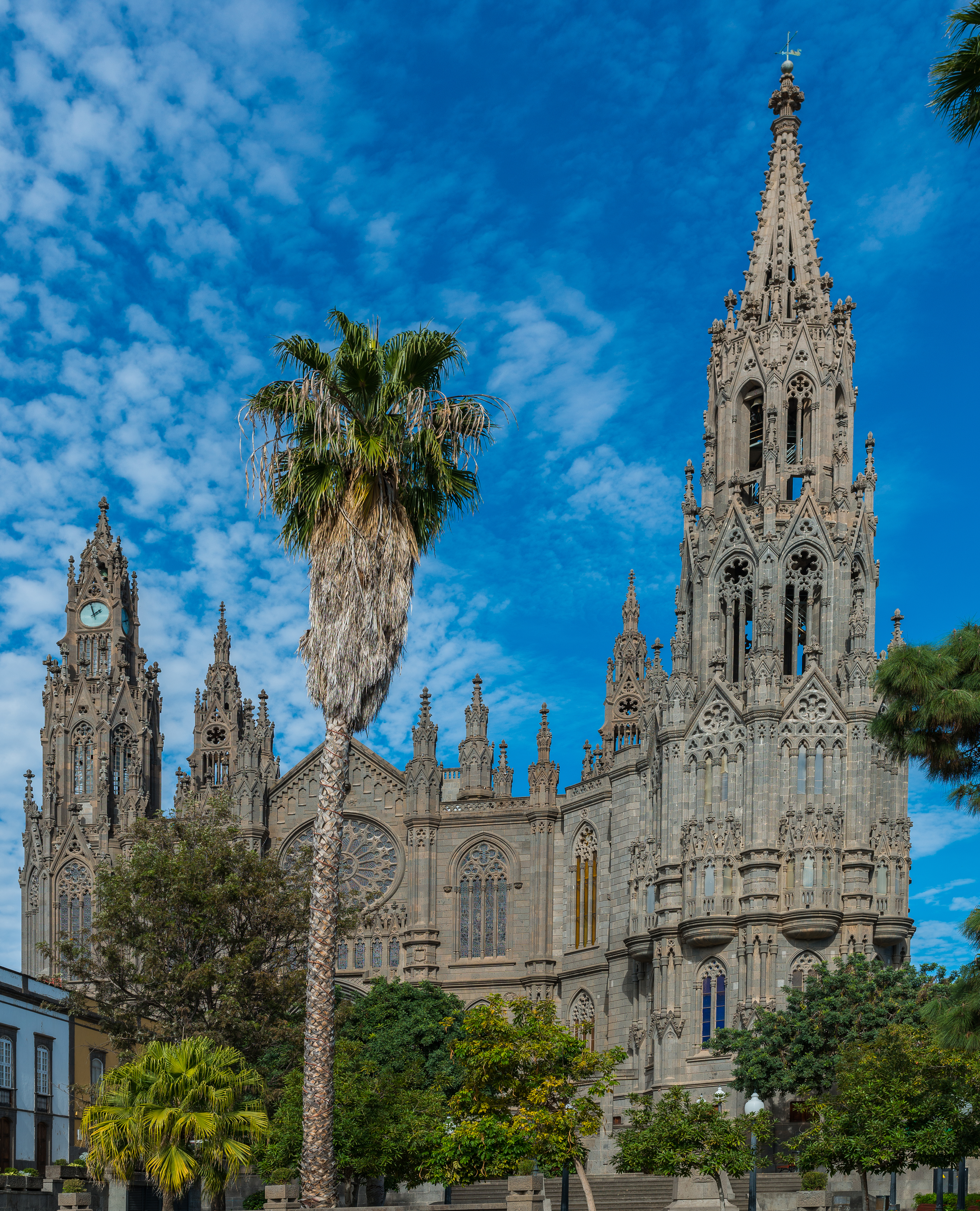
The Church of San Juan Bautista

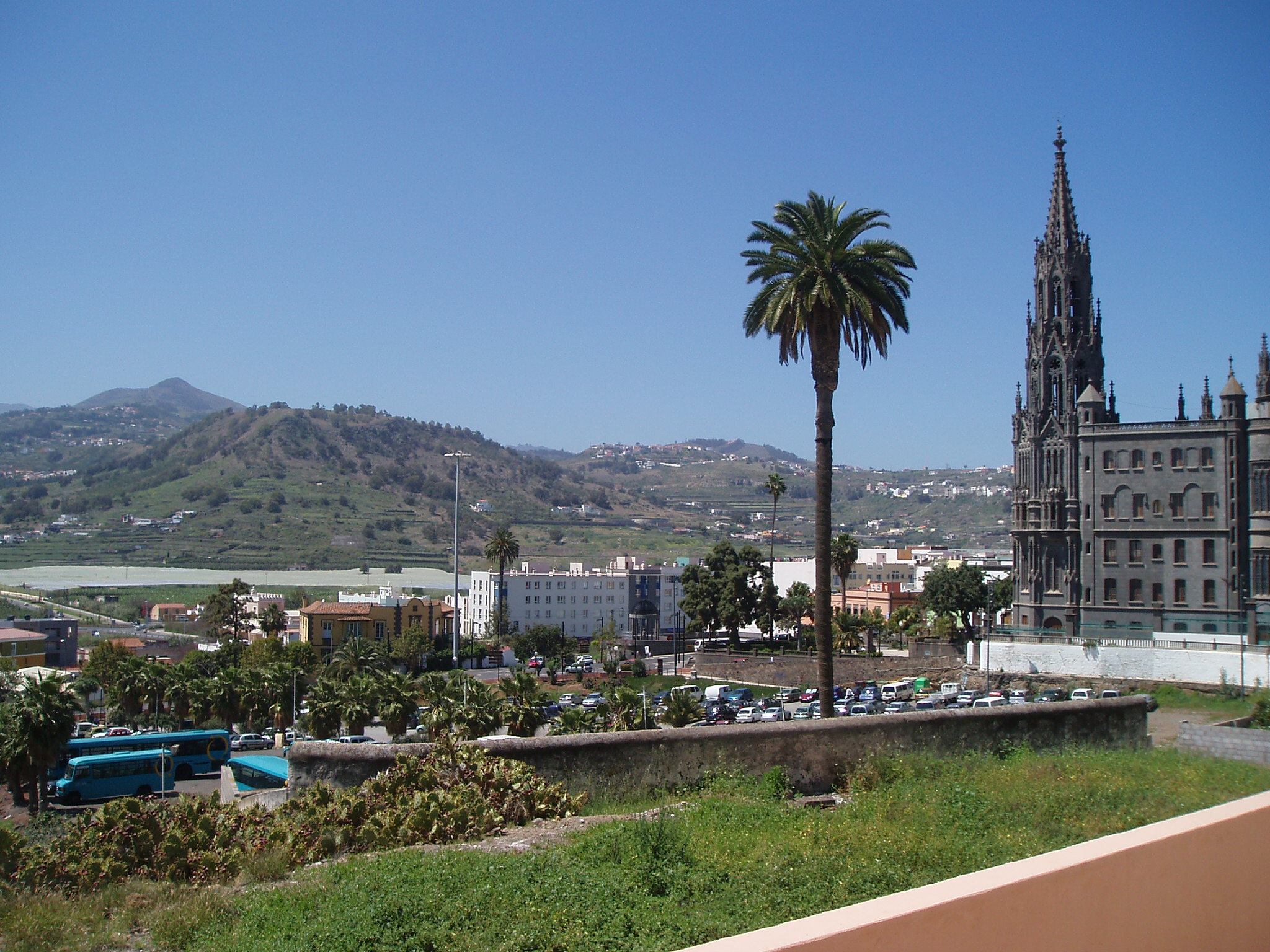
City of Arucas

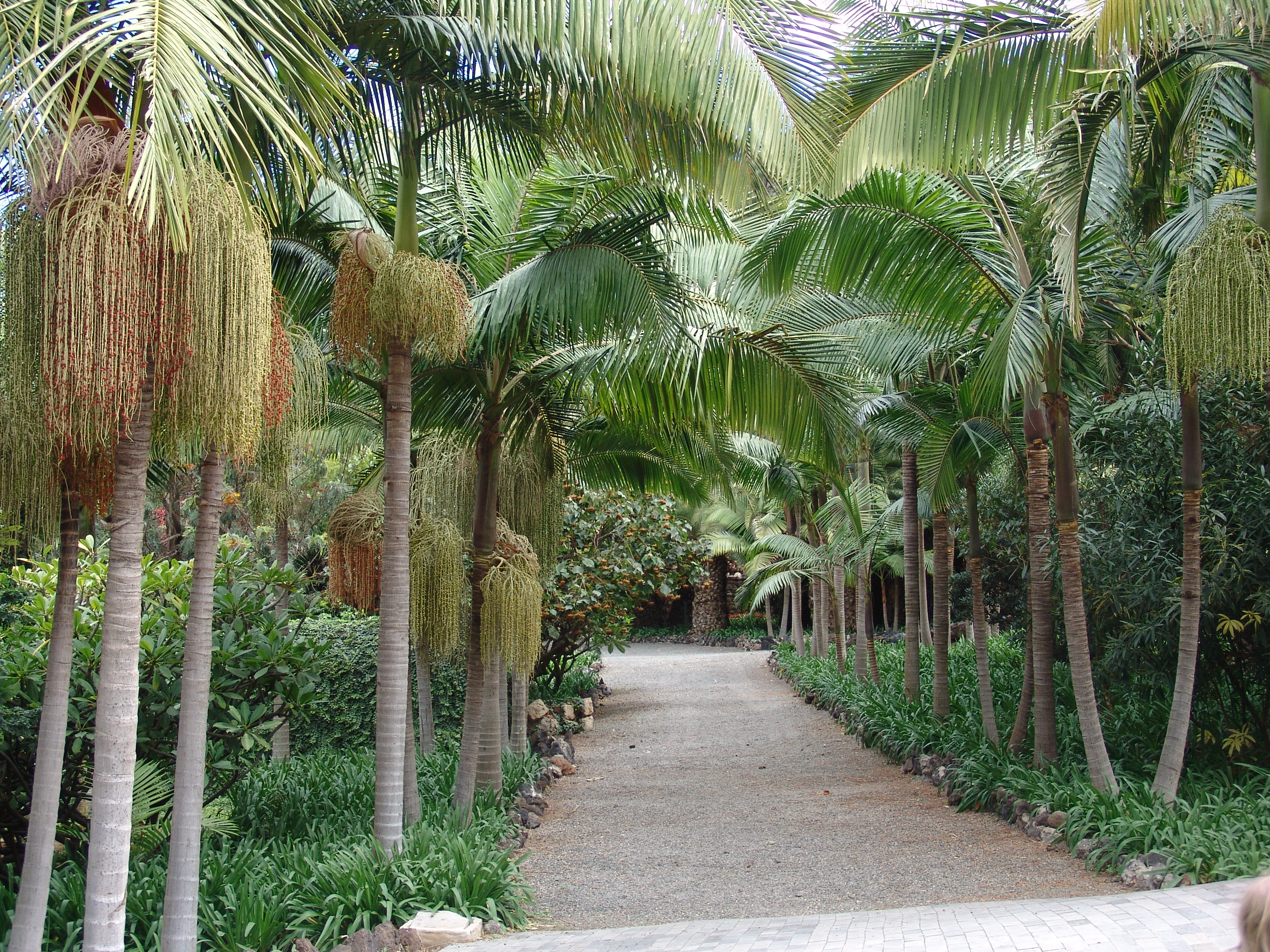
Jardín de la Marquesa de Arucas, the Botanical Garden in Arucas.

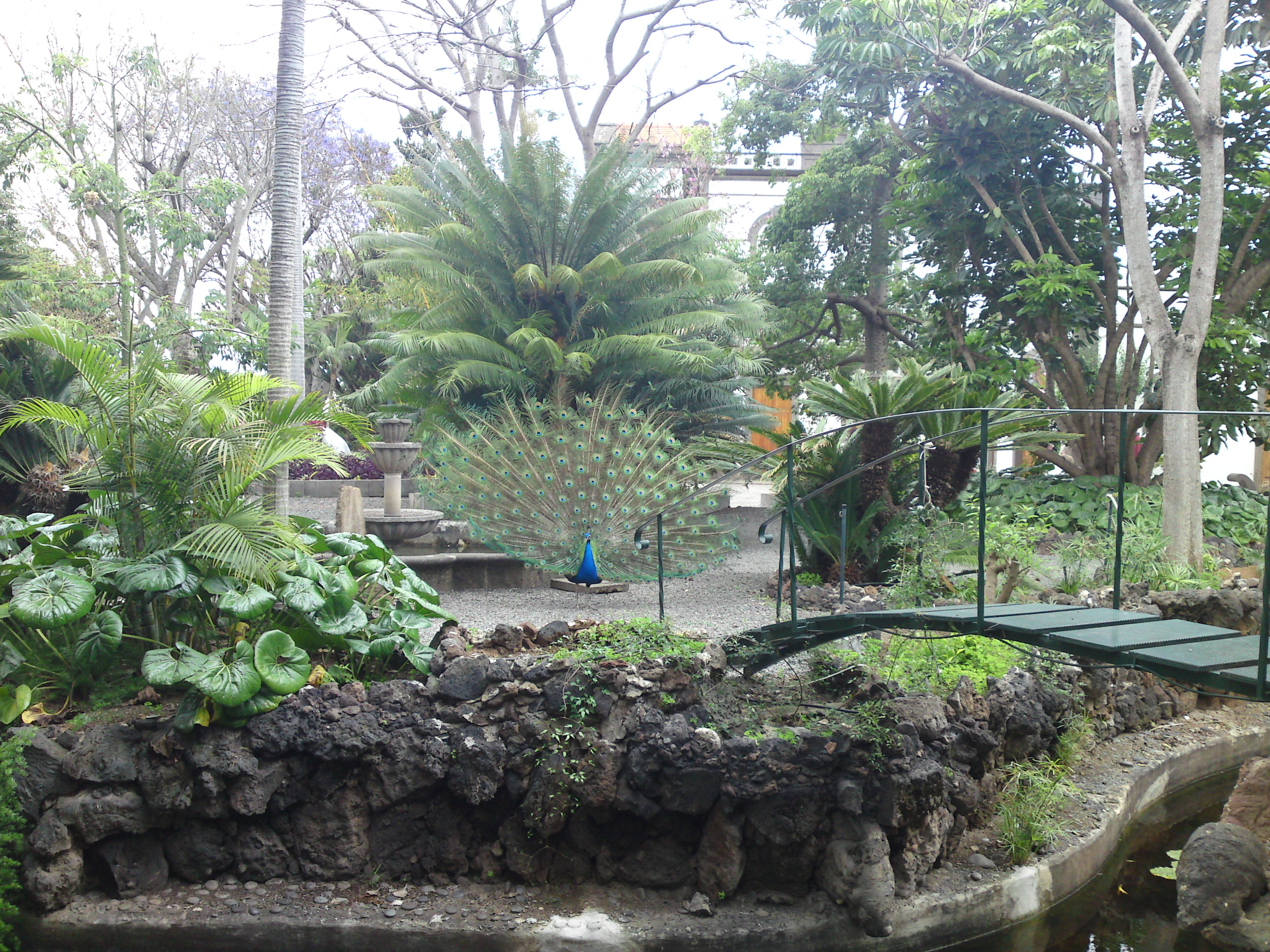
Jardín de la Marquesa de Arucas, the Botanical Garden features more than 500 plant species.

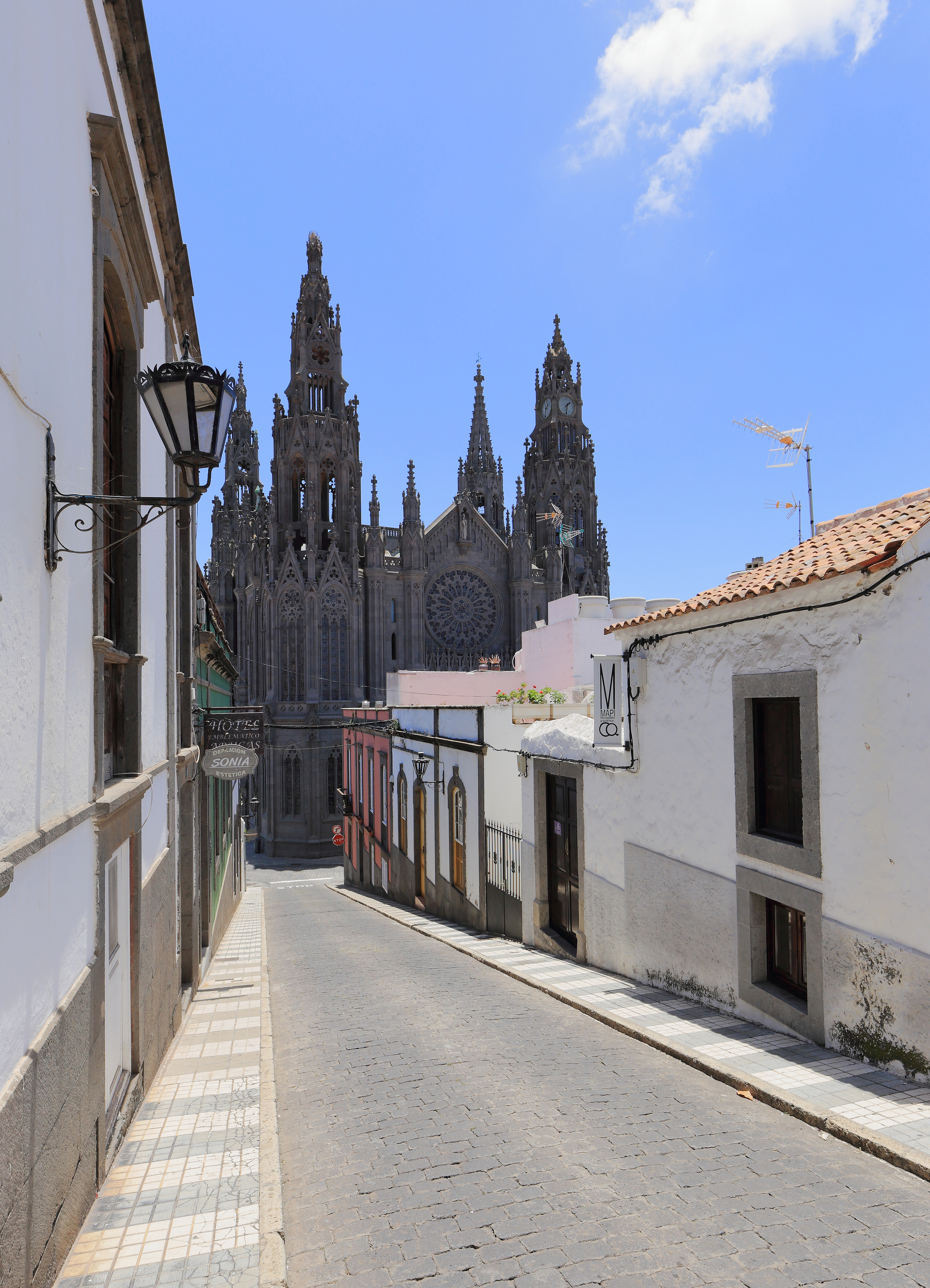
Church of San Juan Bautista as seen from Calle Párroco Morales.

== See also ==
- List of municipalities in Las Palmas
