= Francisco Morales Padrón =

Spanish historian

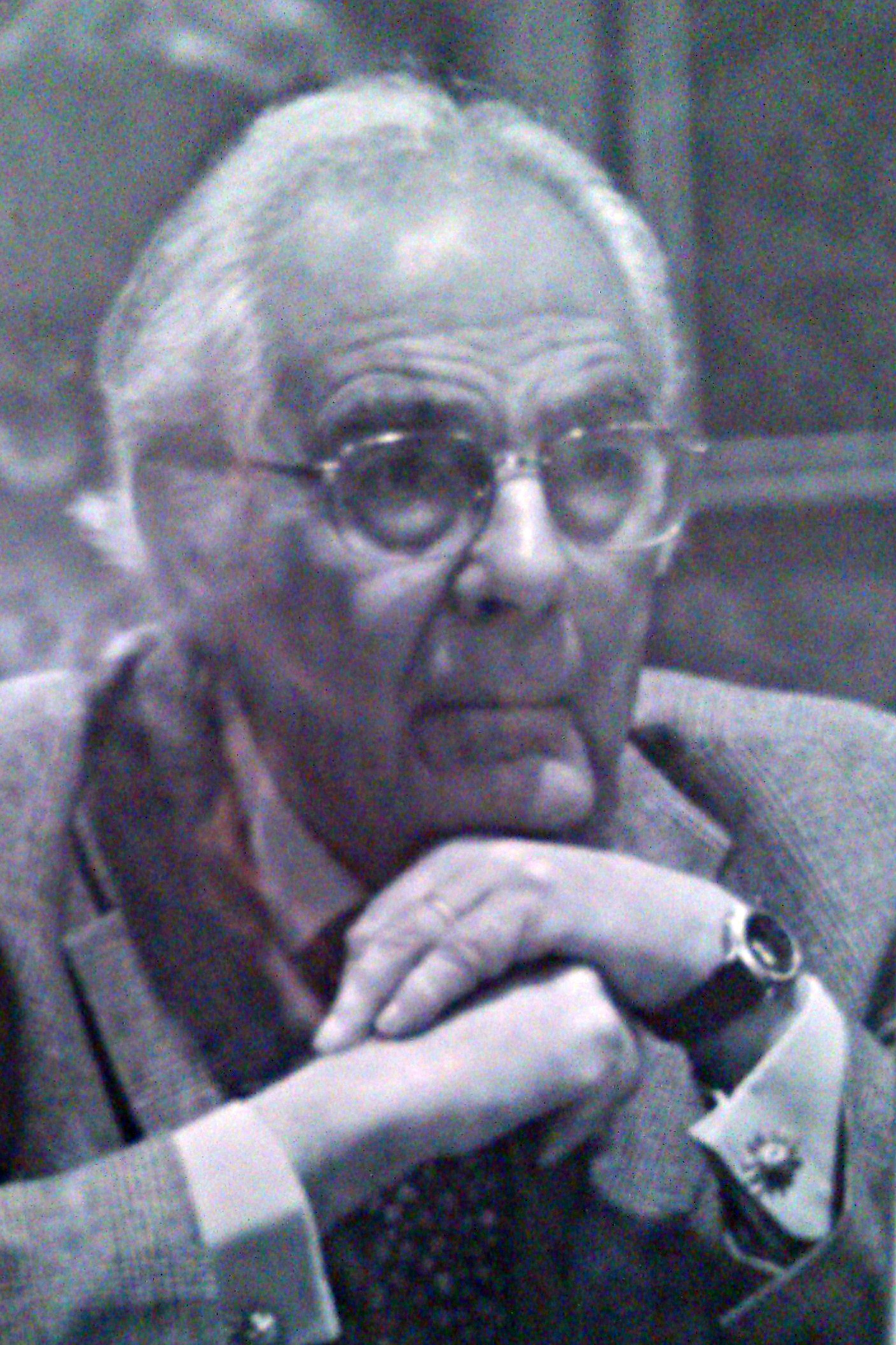
Francisco Morales Padrón

Francisco Morales Padrón (1924 – 15 November 2010) was a Spanish historian recognized for his extensive research on the history of the Spanish Empire and aspects of 19th-century Spanish politics.

== Life and career ==
Padrón was born in Santa Brígida on Gran Canaria. Morales Padrón began his studies at the University of La Laguna and later moved to Seville, where he earned a degree in History of the Americas in 1949. Following his graduation, he held a scholarship at the Escuela de Estudios Hispanoamericanos and worked as an assistant in the library of José Antonio Calderón Quijano. In 1952, he completed his doctoral thesis in Madrid titled Jamaica española.

After obtaining his doctorate, Morales Padrón collaborated with the Spanish National Research Council (CSIC) and served as Professor of the Chair of History of Geographical Discoveries at the University of Seville from 1958 to 1988. He held the title of Emeritus Professor from 1988 until 2006. During his tenure at the university, he served as Vice Dean and Dean of the Faculty of Philosophy and Letters, as well as Vice Dean of the Escuela de Estudios Hispanoamericanos. He also directed the Department of History of the Americas from 1972 to 1978 and served as editor of Historiografía Americanista and the Anuario de Estudios Americanos from 1950 to 1975. In 1976, he began organizing the Canarian-American history colloquia at the Casa de Colón in Las Palmas, which became a leading center for Americanist research.

Morales Padrón frequently participated in international Americanist meetings in Europe and the Americas. He also taught and conducted research at universities outside Spain, including those in Florence, Puerto Rico, Warsaw, and San Miguel de Tucumán, as well as at the Universidad Hispanoamericana de Santa María de la Rábida and the Instituto Pedagógico de Caracas.

== Major works and contributions ==
He authored approximately fifty books, most of which focus on the history of the Americas. Notable works include Historia de América (two volumes, 1962), Historia del Descubrimiento y Conquista de América (1963), Los conquistadores de América (1975), Teoría y Leyes de la Conquista (1979), Historia de Hispanoamérica (1972), Sevilla, Canarias y América (1970), and Sevilla en América, América en Sevilla (2009). Prior to his death, he had prepared two works for publication, including a history of the island of Trinidad.

Morales Padrón's research looked into the process of the conquest of the Canary Islands, which spanned from 1402 to 1496. He examined the methods employed during this period, including the use of terror, enslavement, and deportation, leading to the near-eradication of the indigenous Guanche population. His work highlighted the devastating impact of these actions, which involved the destruction of native culture, language, and social structures.

== Awards and honors ==
Morales Padrón was named an honorary son of Las Palmas de Gran Canaria and a distinguished son of Santa Brígida. In 2004, he received an honorary doctorate from the University of Las Palmas de Gran Canaria for his role in modernizing the study of Canarian history. Other awards include the Can de Plata from the Cabildo of Gran Canaria, honorary membership in the Museo Canario, the Premio Canarias from the Government of the Canary Islands, the Ibn Jatib Humanities Prize from the Junta de Andalucía, the Alfonso X El Sabio plaque, the Order of Merit of the Republic of Peru, and the Order of Andrés Bello of Venezuela. He was also a member of the Real Academia Sevillana de Buenas Letras and a corresponding member of the Real Academia de Historia.
