= Museo Canario =

Museum in Las Palmas de Gran Canaria

El Museo Canario
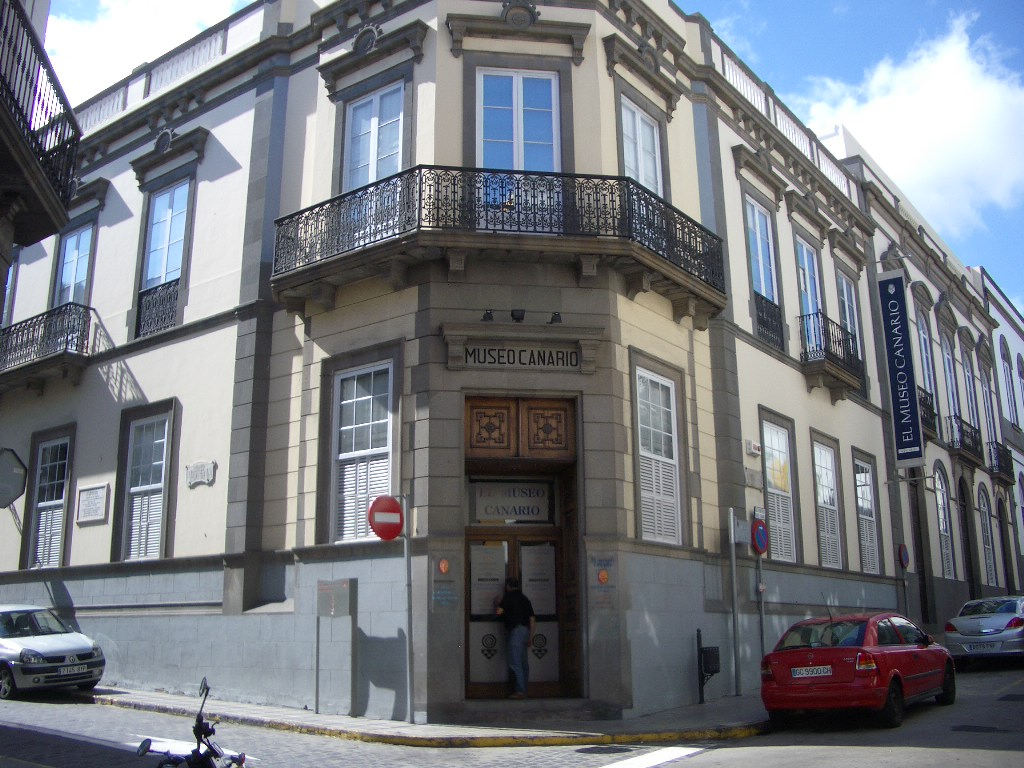
- The Museo Canario building in Vegueta

- Location within Canary Islands
- Established: 1879; 147 years ago
- Location: Las Palmas; Gran Canaria; Spain
- Coordinates: 28.0998323°N 15.4158675°W
- Website: www.elmuseocanario.com

El Museo Canario (English: the Canarian Museum) is an archeological museum in Las Palmas, the capital city of Gran Canaria in the Canary Islands. It is dedicated to the pre-colonial history of the Canary Islands.

== History ==
The museum was founded after a group of intellectuals led by Dr Gregorio Chil y Naranjo and Agustín Millares Torres met in 1879 to set up a historical society. In 1880 they opened a small museum and library on the second floor of Las Palmas City Hall with the aim of promoting the study of Canarian history. There were no higher educational institutions in Gran Canaria at the time, and the museum became the main driving force behind historical research on the island. Archaeologists from the museum organised field trips into the island interior to gather artefacts from ancient settlements of the Guanches, the original indigenous inhabitants of the Canary Islands prior to European settlement.

Scholarly interest in anthropology had been fuelled in the late 19th century by the discovery of Cro-Magnon man in France in 1868, and the first Canarian archaeologists founded the museum as part of their programme to promote the mistaken idea that there was a link between the European paleolithic populations and the ancient Canarian Guanches (it is now known that Guanches were North African in origin). A number of the museum's founders had close scientific links with some of the leading French archaeologists of the day, including René Verneau, Paul Broca, Jean Louis Armand de Quatrefages de Bréau and Ernest Hamy.

Dr Chil died in 1901, and after the death of his widow in 1913, their home in the Vegueta district of Las Palmas was bequeathed to the museum society. The museum collection relocated there in 1923, but its opening was delayed until 1930 by the economic crisis that followed World War I. The museum continues to operate today in the former Chil residence.

== Collection ==
The museum's archaeological collection mainly consists of prehistoric remains and historic artefacts originating from the early human populations on Gran Canaria, as well as artefacts originating from other islands in the Canarian Archipelago. Items on display include ceramic vessels, religious idols, pintaderas, tooled implements made of bone or wood, animal skins and other remains.

A popular artefact in the collection is the so-called "Idol of Tara", a pre-Hispanic terracotta human figure. There is no data on its origin or original use, but 1950s researchers linked it to the pre-Hispanic village of Tara, in the municipality of Telde.

As the largest archaeological collection in the Canary Islands, El Museo Canario is an important resource in the study of prehispanic society in the archipelago. It has been described by El Mundo newspaper as "one of the best archaeological museums in Spain".

The museum today is a popular tourist attraction in Las Palmas, and its displays include Canarian ceramics, mummies and a reproduction of the Painted Cave, Galdar.

A notable feature of the museum is the Verneau Room, named after the French archaeologist, an exhibition of 900 human skulls and half a dozen Guanche mummies which intentionally retains the museum's original 19th century display layout. The room, sometimes referred to as "a museum within a museum", reflects on the racial views of anthropology at the time of the museum's founding and explores the changes in modern display practice.

Collection of the Museo Canario

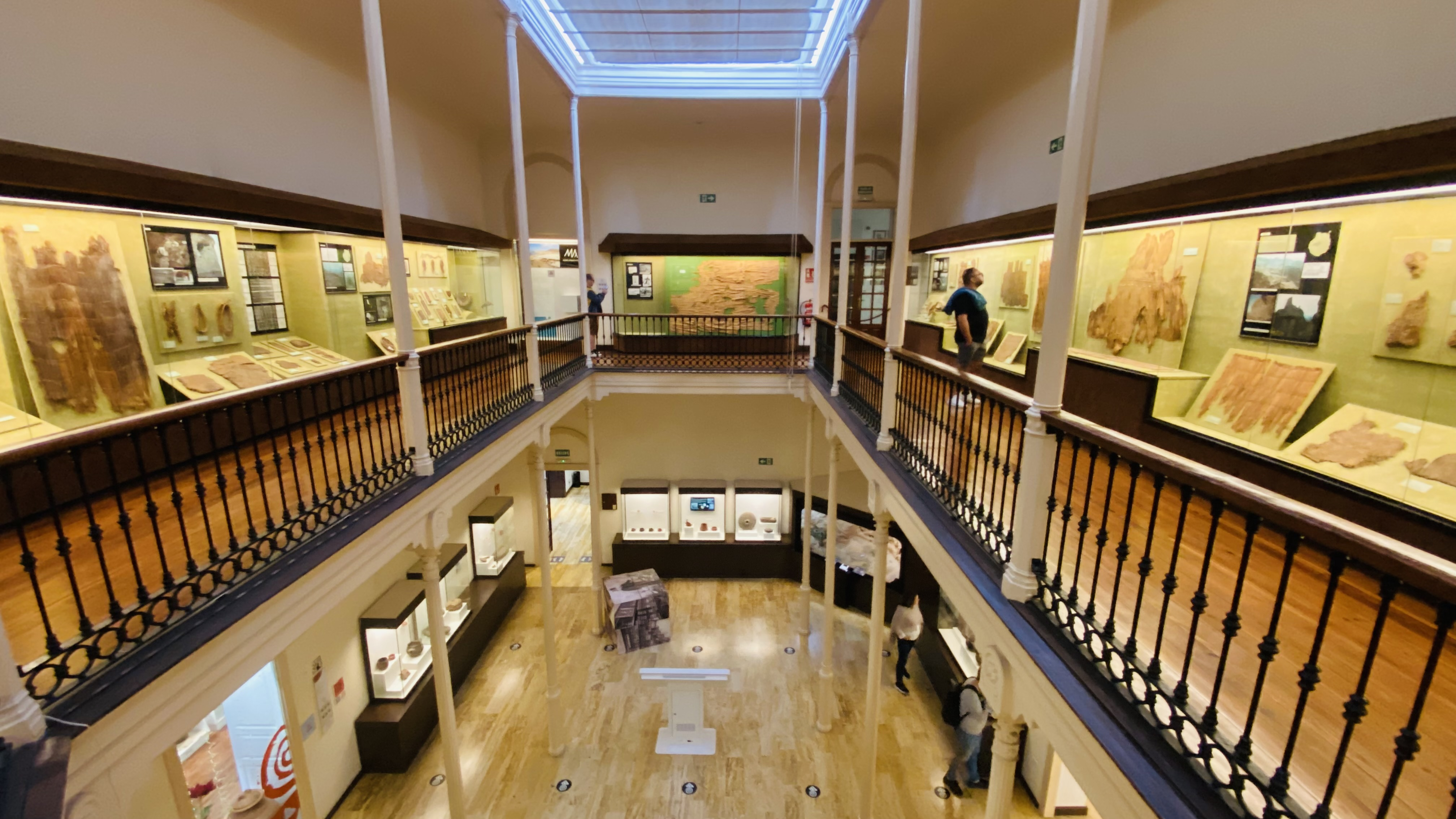
The central hall

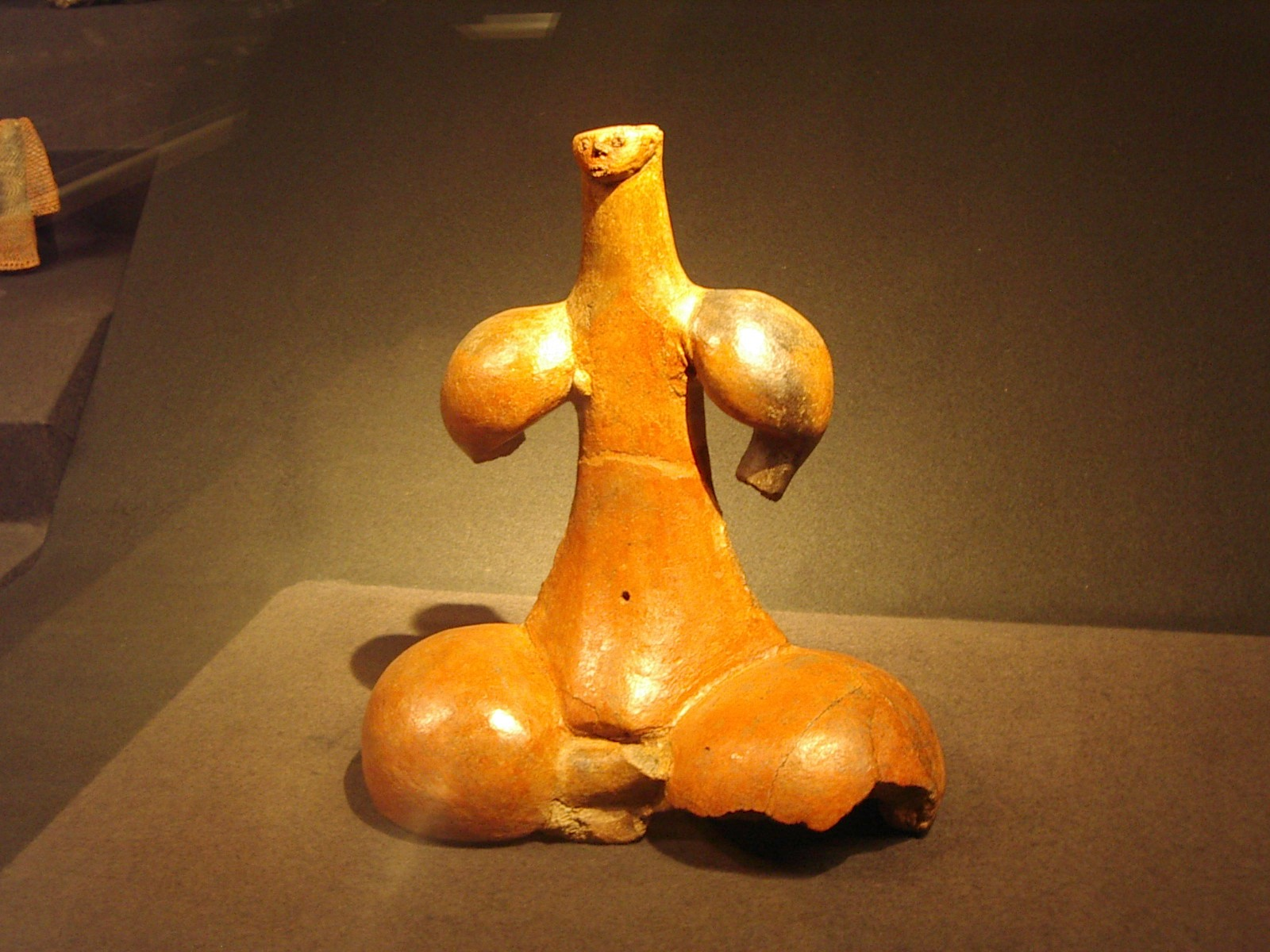
The "Idol of Tara", thought to be a Guanches cult image

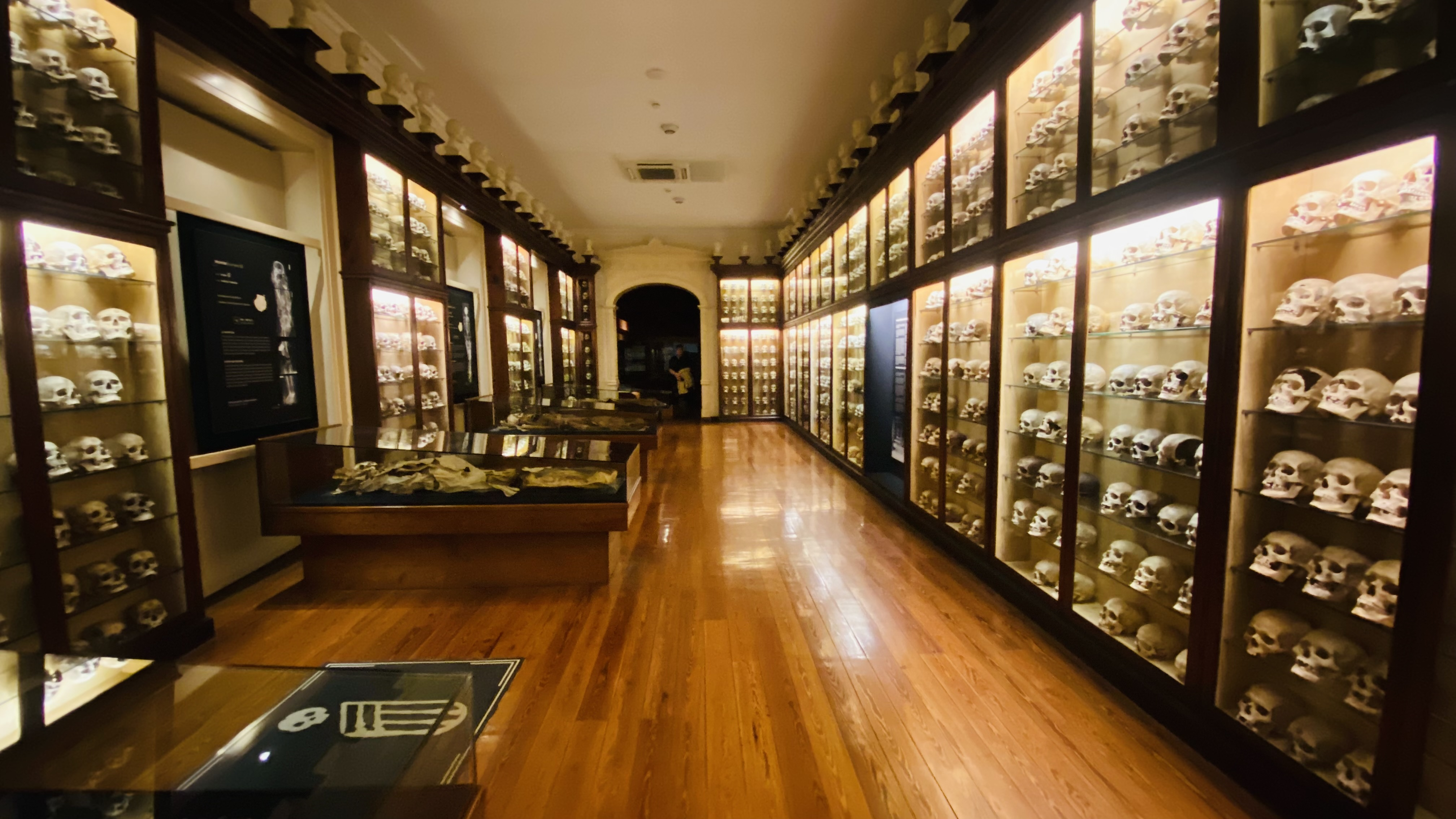
The Verneau room

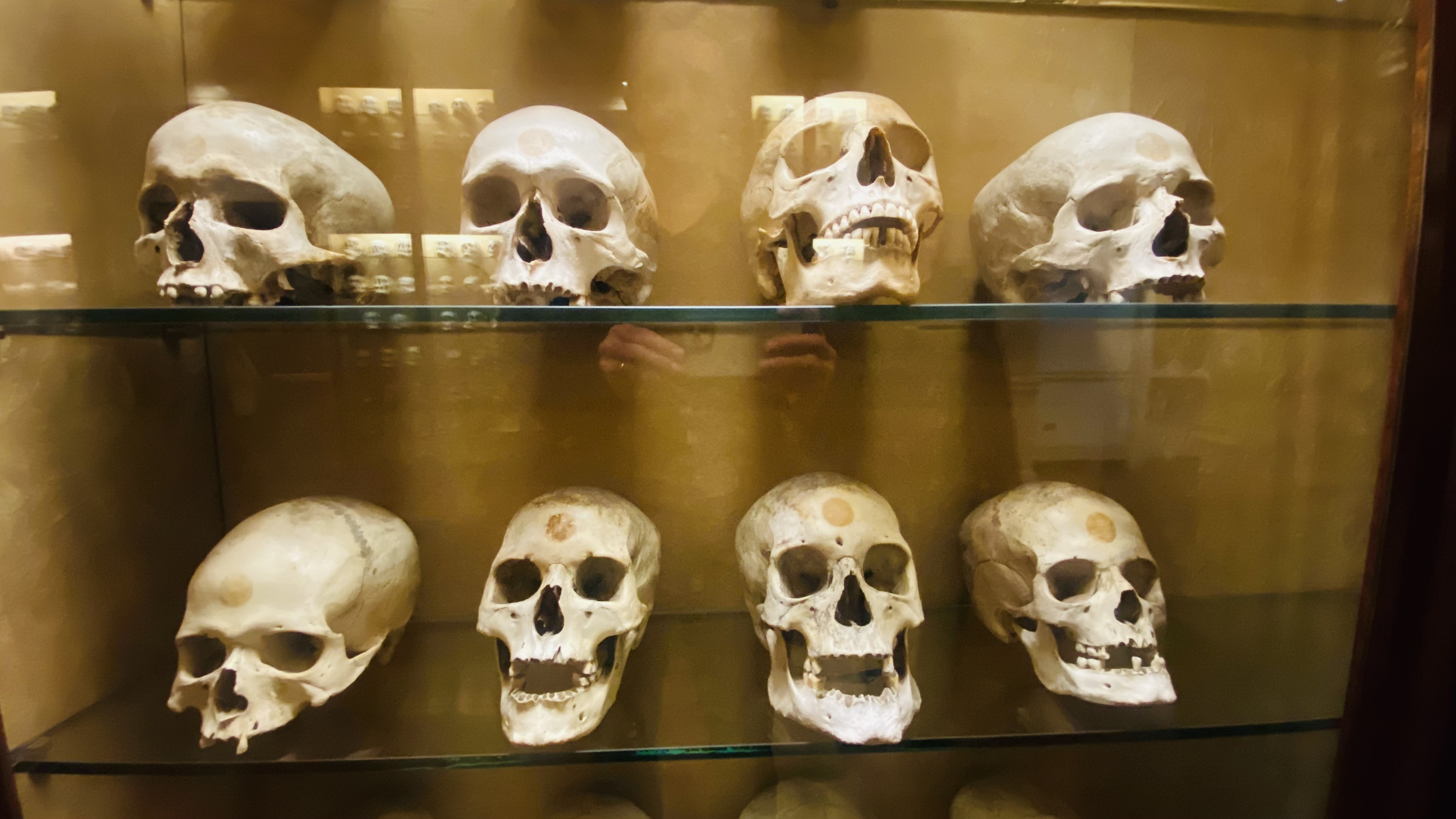
Guanche skulls on display

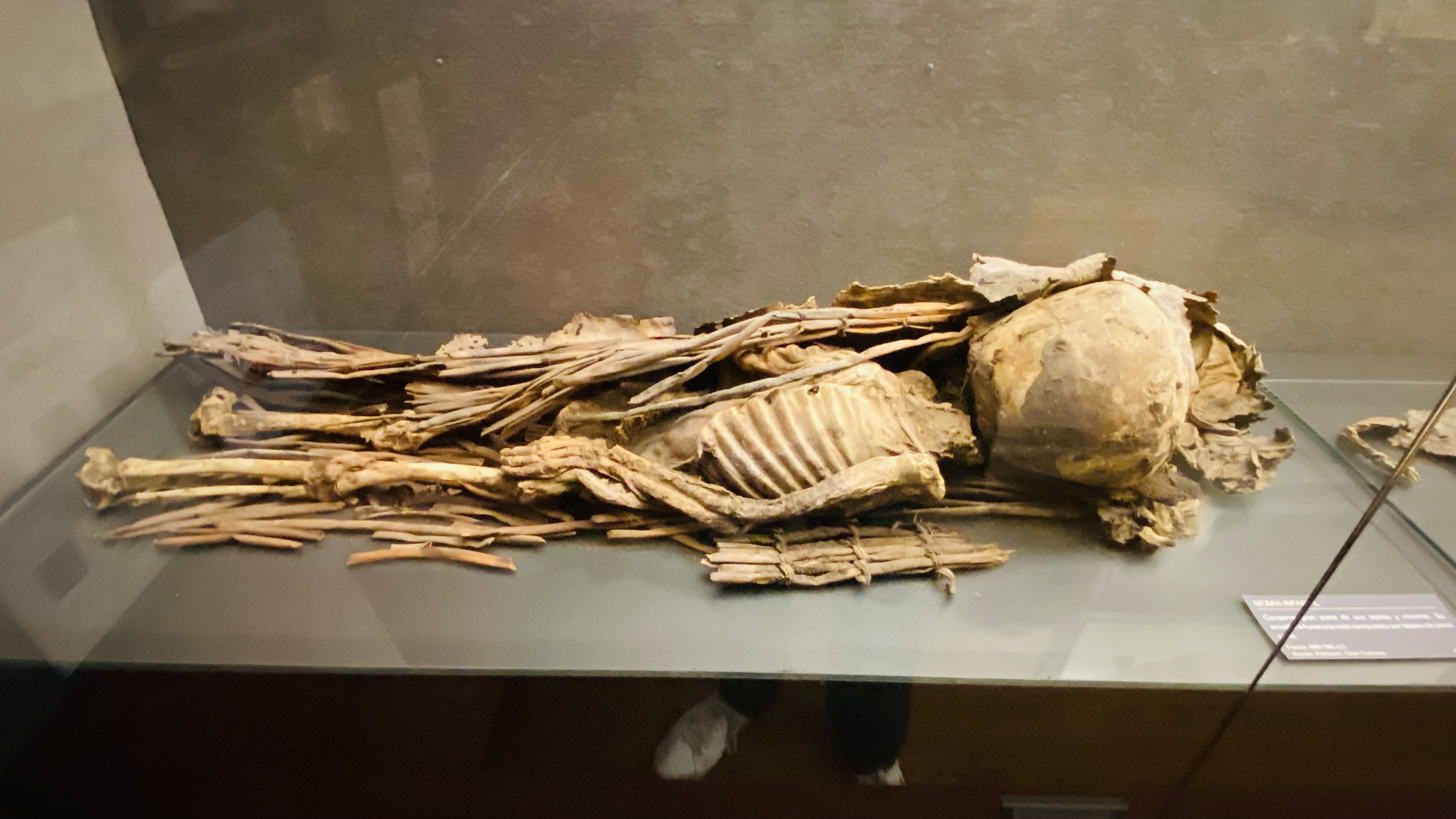
A mummified Guanche child

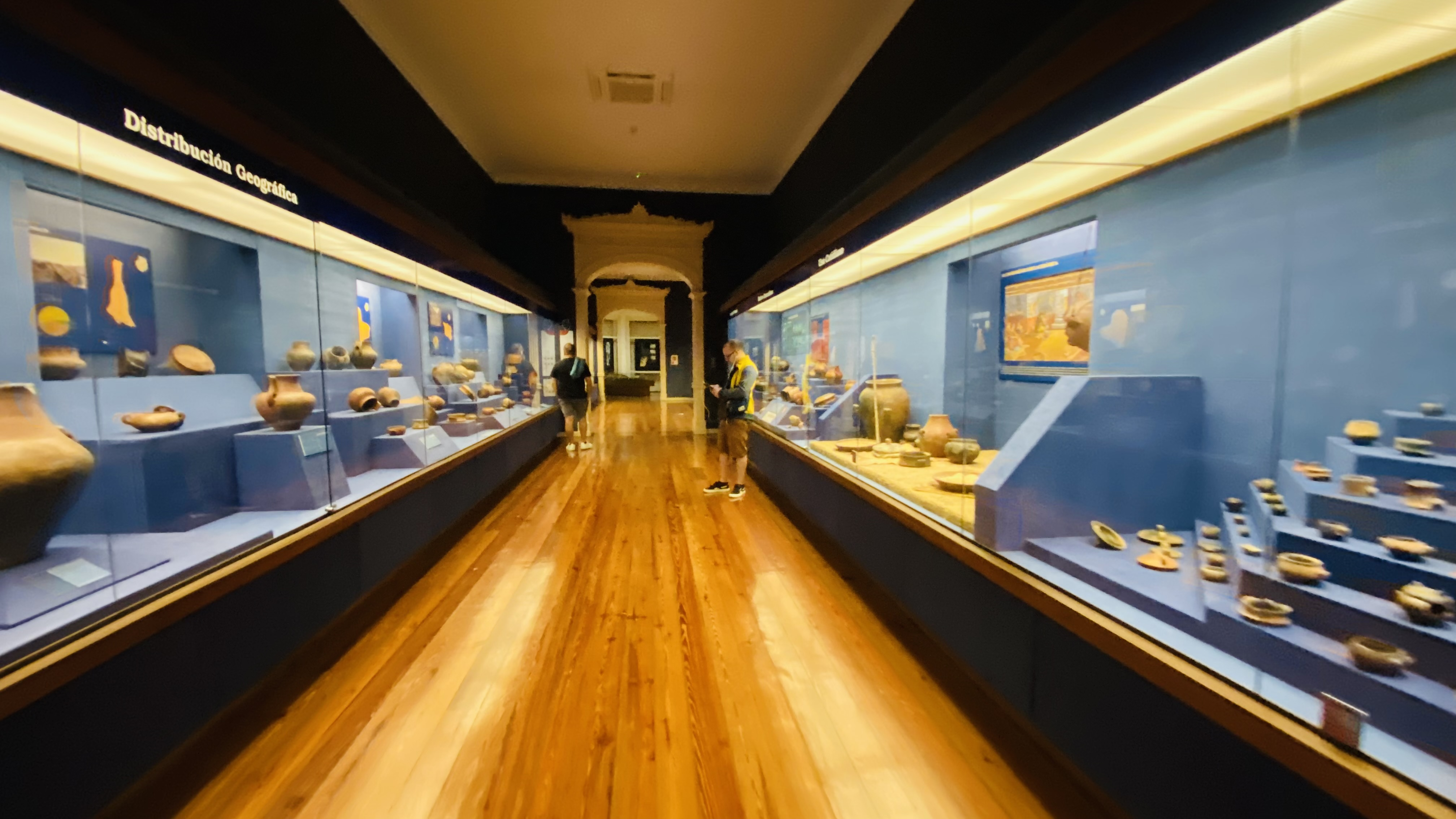
Displays of Guanches artefacts
