= Pedro Espinosa Lorenzo =

Spanish pianist and pedagogue

- Born: 1934
- Died: 10 September 2007 (aged 72–73)

Pedro Espinosa Lorenzo (1934–10 September 2007) was a Spanish pianist and pedagogue from Gáldar.
