= Nuraghe Genna Maria =

Archaeological site in Italy

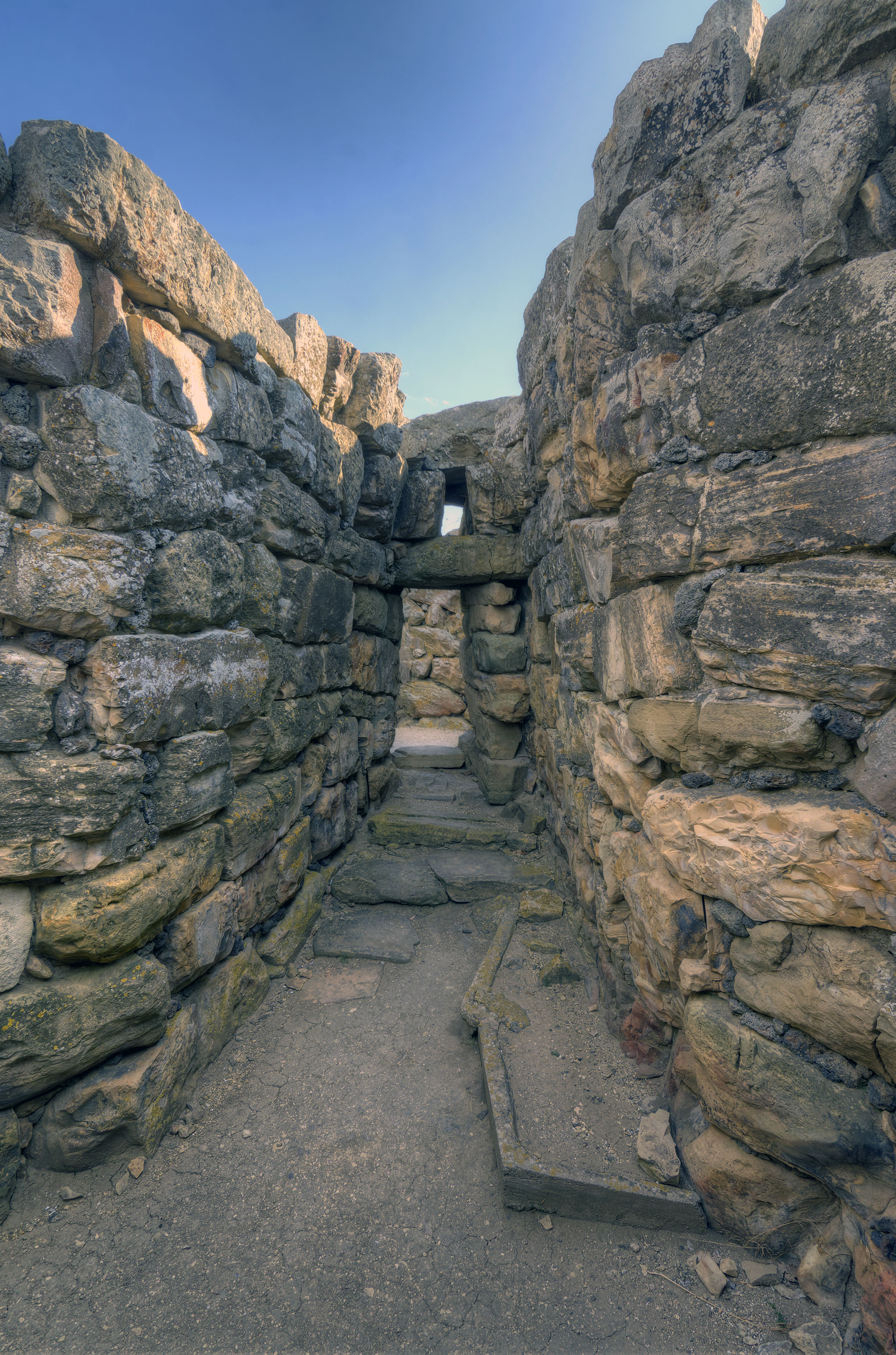
- Interactive map of Nuraghe Genna Maria
- Type: Nuraghe
- Location: Sardinia, Italy
- Region: Mediterranean

History
- Built: Bronze Age
- Abandoned: Roman Era

Site notes
- Condition: Ruins

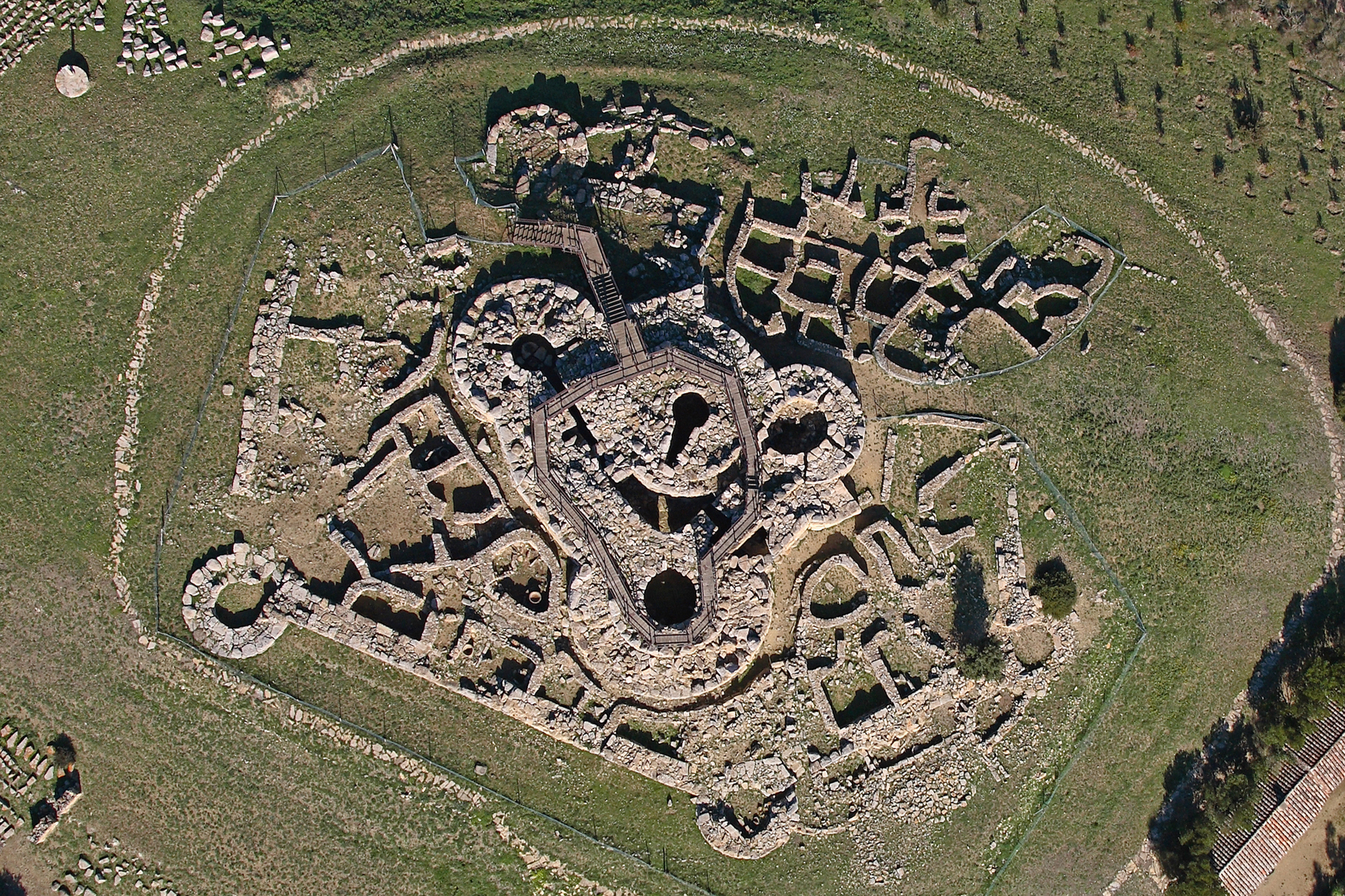
Nuraghe Genna Maria site, Sardinia

Nuraghe Genna Maria is a Nuragic complex located in Villanovaforru, South Sardinia, dating back to the Final Bronze Age. The Nuragic civilization, which lasted in Sardinia from approximately 1800 BCE to 238 BCE, is known for its stone towers called "nuraghi". These structures served various functions, including defensive, residential, and ritual purposes. Genna Maria, like many nuraghi, was strategically built on a hilltop, providing a vantage point over the surrounding landscape.

Nuragic settlement is roughly 5000 square metres in size. Built around a central tower (mastio) that dates to between 1700 and 1350 BCE, the Nuraghe is thought to be roughly 10 m high. It is surrounded by a three-lobed (originally four-lobed) bastion and preceded by a courtyard with a well or cistern. From the east tower to the north-west one, it has undergone partial renovation. A hexagonal ante-mural with towers at the apexes and a southern entrance encircles the Nuraghe.

== Background and culture ==
The Nuragic societies are known for their megalithic architecture — the "nuraghi" (singular "nuraghe"). These stone tower structures represent the core characteristic of their shared material culture. Genna Maria serves as one of the better-preserved examples of the nuraghi.

Beyond their architectural uniformity, Nuragic societies also showed similarities in pottery styles, tomb structures, ritual sites, agricultural and food-processing tools, and domestic utensils. These commonalities indicate a high degree of interaction among the island's communities.

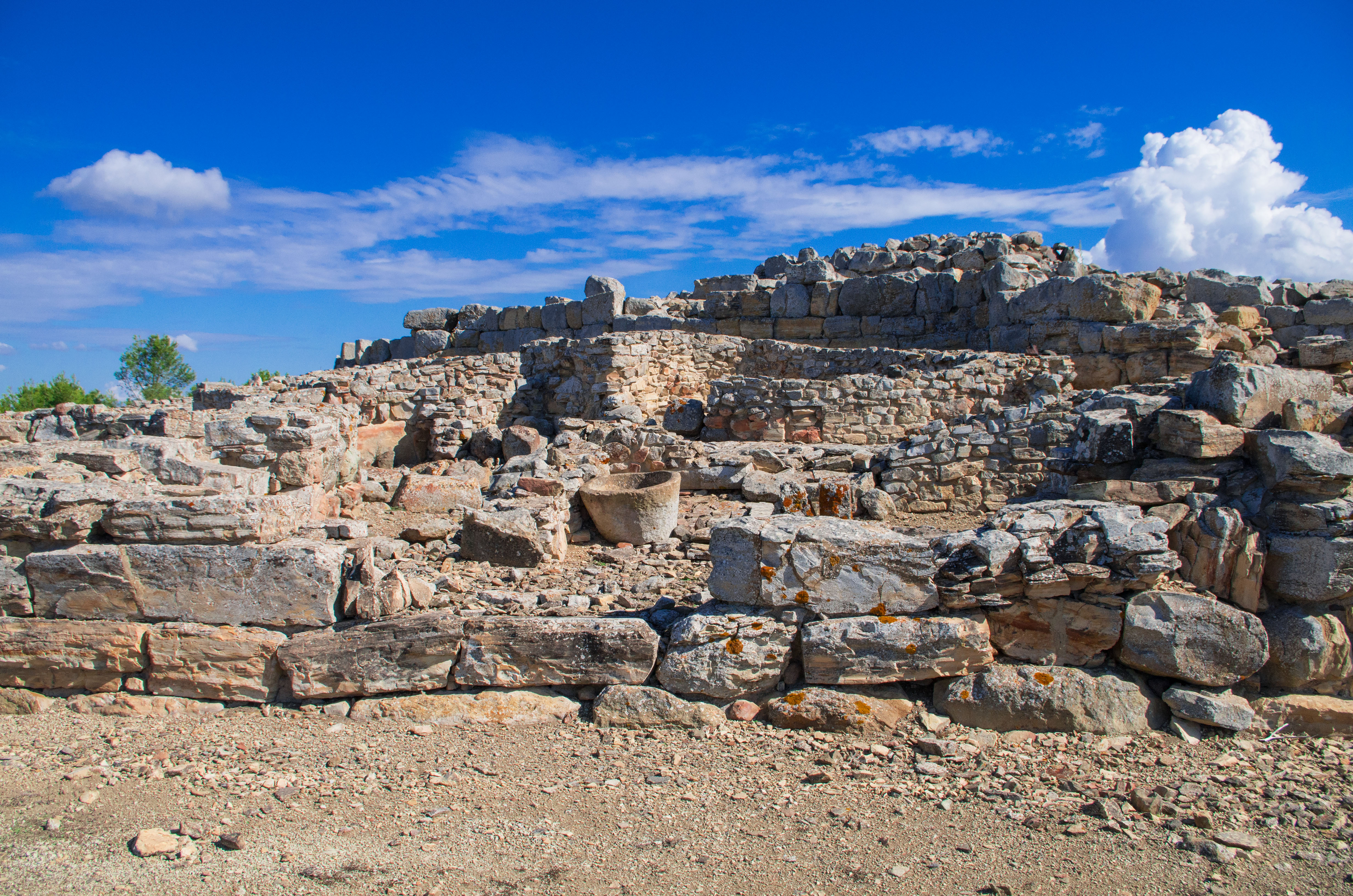
Megalithic architecture in Nuraghe Genna Maria

== Architectural structure ==
Nuraghe Genna Maria consists of a central tower and a trilobate bastion, with later additions including an outer defensive wall and towers, forming a hexagonal layout.

It is built using large, unworked basalt or limestone blocks without mortar, following the typical Nuragic dry-stone masonry technique.

The site evolved over time, showing the architectural development of the Nuragic civilization, particularly the transition from simple nuraghi (single towers) to complex nuraghi (multi-towered fortresses) during the Middle to Late Bronze Age. With over 7,000 nuraghi in Sardinia, Genna Maria is an example of Nuragic architectural and social evolution during the Bronze Age.

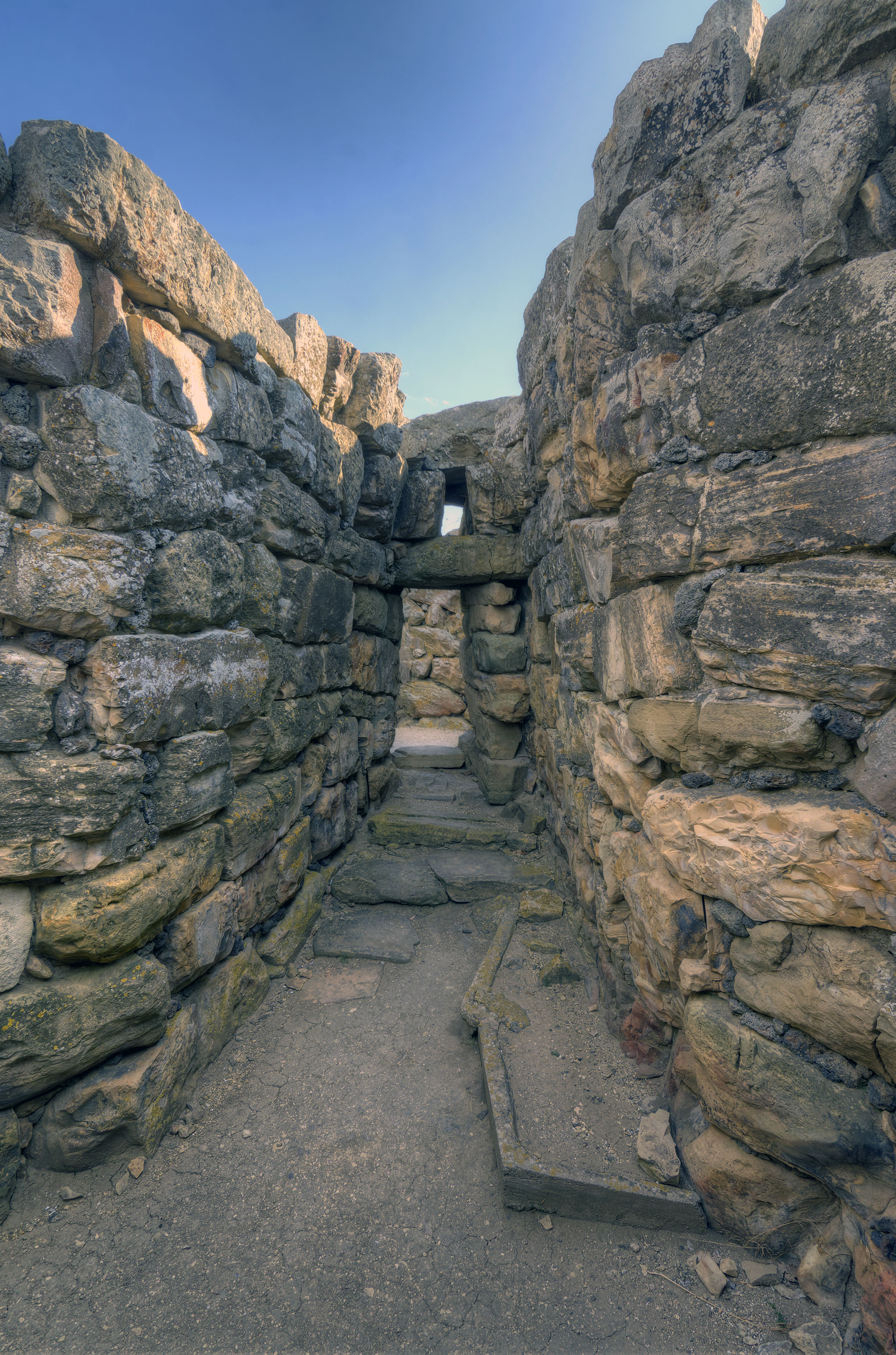
Nuraghe Genna Maria structure

=== Settlement and social organization ===
The surrounding village provides insights into Nuragic social structure. The settlement was organized around a central layout of the central nuraghe, suggesting a hierarchical society where the tower may have served as a political or military center. The presence of huts, storage pits, and workshops indicates a community structure including an agricultural and craft-based economy.

=== Religious and cultural significance ===
The site was abandoned after being destroyed by fire in the 8th century BCE but was later repurposed in the 5th–4th centuries BCE as a small religious sanctuary.

=== Comparison with other Nuraghi ===
It resembles Su Nuraxi in Barumini, a UNESCO-listed complex nuraghe, similar in design but better preserved (Ialongo, 2017).

The location of Sardinia, Italy

== Location and etymology ==
The Nuraghe Genna Maria is situated atop a cone-shaped hill near Villanovaforru, at an elevation of 409 meters above sea level. Its name derives from the Latin Janua Maris ("Door of the Sea"), as both the Gulf of Cagliari and the Bay of Oristano are visible from the summit on clear days.

== Architectural phases ==
=== Middle of the Bronze Age (16th–15th century BCE) ===
There was an early settlement predating the nuraghe.

=== 14th Century BCE ===
The construction of a three-towered nuraghe, later enclosed by an outer defensive wall with additional towers, took place.

=== 12th–11th Century BCE ===
A reinforcement with a support wall, similar to contemporary nuraghi like Su Nuraxi (Barumini), was added.

=== Collapse and reuse (c. 1000 BCE) ===
A partial collapse happened, of which the cause is unknown; complex multi-room houses were built over the ruins of the outer wall.

=== Village life (10th–9th Century BCE) ===
The surrounding village was a pastoral-agricultural community, which engaged in grain cultivation, viticulture and livestock farming.

=== 4th Century BCE ===
The central tower and courtyard were repurposed for agrarian rituals dedicated to Demeter.

=== Roman era (Post-238 BCE) ===
The cult transformed into worship of Sarda Ceres (Romanized Sardinian harvest goddess).

=== Early Middle Ages ===
Pagan rituals persisted despite Christianization, prompting Pope Gregory the Great to urge local bishops to suppress them.

== Metallurgy and winemaking technology ==
Artifacts demonstrating the Nuragic culture's metallurgical skills and craft production, as well as potential trade connections with other Mediterranean regions, have been found. The unearthed artifacts are pottery, metal artifacts and ritual objects. Archaeologists have uncovered copper, bronze, and even some iron objects, confirming sophisticated metallurgical techniques in Late Bronze Age Sardinia. Small bronze figurines (bronzetti) suggest the site may have had religious or ceremonial functions.

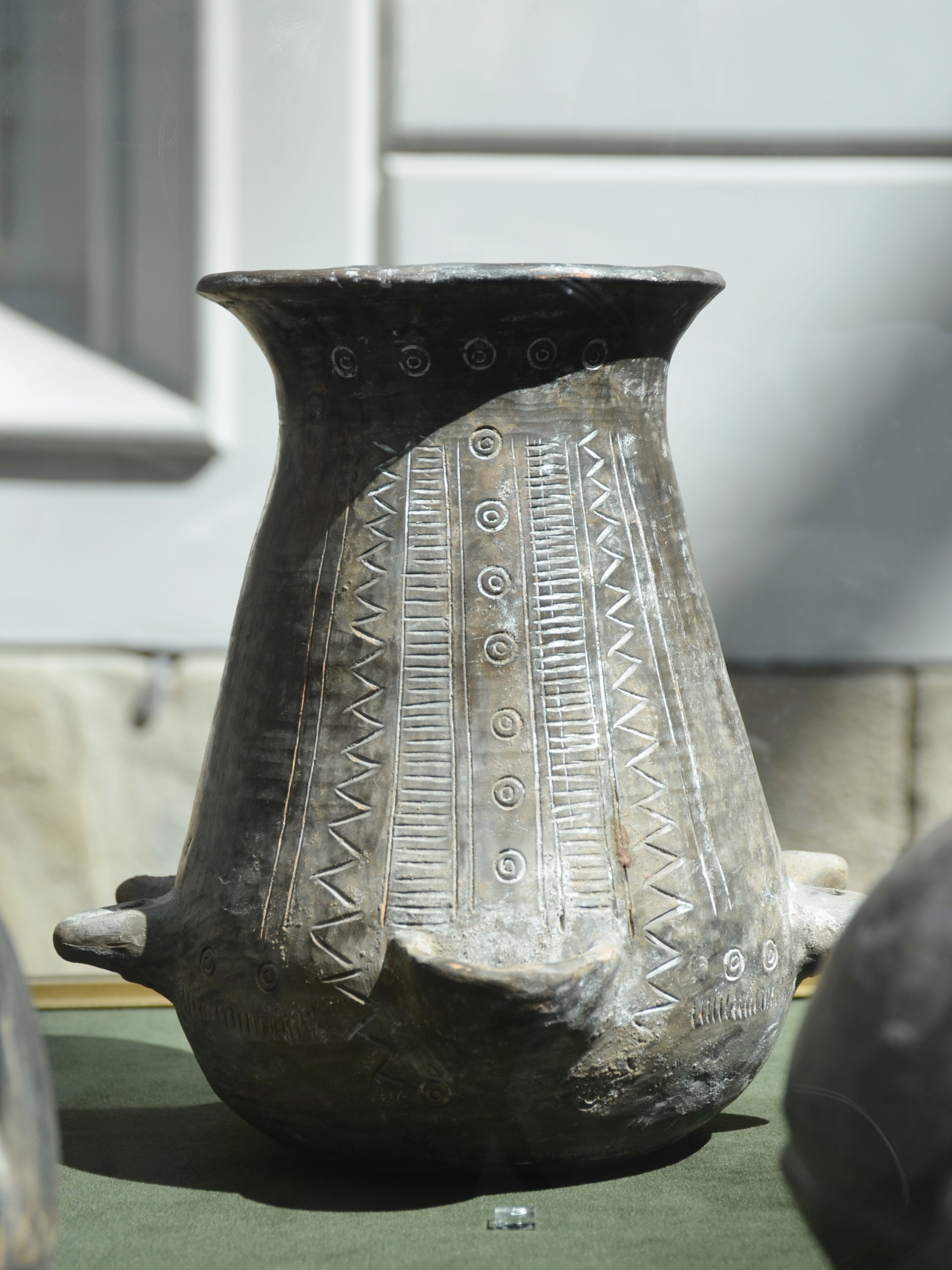
Nuragic culture pottery, early Iron Age

A stone artifact in Hut γ, excavated in 1991 and preserved intact since its collapse (~9th century BCE), was identified as a grape-crushing press (laccus). The structure consists of two main components: an upper basin with a sloping surface designed for crushing grapes, and a lower collection vat positioned to receive the juice. This configuration allowed for rapid separation of juice from skins, a feature that strongly suggests the production of white or rosé wines, as it would have minimized skin contact time. Based on the dimensions and design, researchers estimate the system could process between 180 and 250 kilograms of grapes per batch. At an approximate 50% yield rate, this would have produced about 90 to 125 liters of must per pressing. High-Performance Liquid Chromatography with Diode-Array Detection (HPLC-DAD) and Ultra-High Performance Liquid Chromatography-High Resolution Mass Spectrometry (UHPLC-HQOMS) identified tartaric acid residues on stone artifacts, confirming their use for winemaking.

Associated artifacts, including carbonized grape seeds, specialized ceramic vessels, and swine bones, suggest the site served not only production purposes but also potentially ritual or communal wine consumption activities. This evidence positions Nuraghe Genna Maria as a key site for understanding the development of Sardinia's wine industry and suggests that Sardinia's Nuragic civilization had already established sophisticated winemaking practices by the Final Bronze Age, challenging traditional narratives that attribute the spread of viticulture solely to Phoenician and Greek traders.

=== Connection to other Nuragic winemaking sites ===
Genna Maria's winemaking facilities show technical similarities to the rock-cut pressing installations (Types I-V) documented in west-central Sardinia (e.g., Guilcer and Barigadu regions). However, Genna Maria's structures predate most of these and are directly associated with a settlement context. Comparable winemaking structures also appear in Punic and Roman-era sites (e.g., Terralba, Orroli), suggesting a long-standing tradition of wine production on the island.

=== Possible ritual use ===
Since wine residues have been found in ceremonial contexts at other Nuragic sites (e.g., Abini), winemaking at Genna Maria may have served not only daily consumption but also ritual or religious purposes.

== Structural stability issues ==
The fact that these megalithic constructions have remained intact for centuries despite the accumulation of rubbish throughout time presents an opportunity to appreciate this legacy, even in part. It is widely known that the excavation process exposes these structures to a variety of environmental and anthropogenic deteriorating variables, which significantly speeds up the kinetics of degradation and jeopardises the preservation of this legacy.

Pulverisation, exfoliation, detachments, mineral changes, cracking, and various forms of fracturing—mostly brought on by wetting-drying, thermal shock, biological colonisation, salt crystallisation, and freeze-thaw—are a few of the physical and chemical weathering processes that can happen on stone in situ. Among the most significant factors influencing stone degradation are the final two in particular.

The phenomena is brought on by salt phase changes inside the material's porous structure, which can be intrinsic or extrinsic in origin and depend on environmental factors. Volume changes brought on by the various cycles of salt crystallisation and dissolution, hydration, and dehydration result in internal pressures (inside the pores) that surpass the structure's elastic limit, causing it to fracture and causing material loss and separation.

Similarly, cycles of freezing and thawing produce similar consequences. In this case, water changes from a liquid to a solid state as a result of temperature variations, and vice versa. Degradation happens as a result of capillary flow and significant pressures on the pore walls brought on by the volume increase during ice formation as well as the effects of osmotic and interstitial pressure.

The distribution of pore sizes impacts structural damage because larger pores are initially implicated in ice production and interstitial pressure rises with decreasing pore size. Materials with a higher percentage of big holes are more resistant to freeze-thaw cycles than those with a smaller percentage of small pores.

Alternating freezing and thawing causes structural degradation that alters the distribution of pore sizes, progressively moving them towards bigger pore volumes and changing the sorptivity coefficient.

In this regard, the only way to help protect this legacy is to conduct ongoing monitoring of the archaeological site, which takes into account all elements that jeopardise its preservation and permits the planning of regular and preventive maintenance.

Future barriers to the preservation of these structures include changing of future environmental and cultural conditions, the complexity of relationships, the incompleteness of characterizations, and the uncertainty surrounding the degredation of structures and materials over time. But with the development of new conceptual tools, it is possible to start creating monitoring and prediction models for the intricacies of the old buildings.

Throughout the centuries of use, consistent static-structural restoration efforts (surrounding walls) have also been documented. The collapse of the hill (palaeofrane), which was supported by a megalithic edifice with strong walls that rose at least a dozen metres and so had significant mass, was most likely the cause of the ancient instability. These elements had a part in the materials' short lifespan and static-constructive issues. A village's living structures were constructed against the old structures during the Iron Age, using some of the original small-scale materials. The location was still visited during the Roman era.

The surviving structures were no higher than a few metres at the time of the excavation. Following the shock of the discovery, the archaeologists had to deal with a number of statically unstable circumstances as well as the obvious lack of durability of the materials in place. Using the few resources on hand, they delivered a number of emergency interventions. Cement mortars were applied to some masonry portions as part of these interventions.

Early on, the site was effectively developed as a model centre for Sardinian archaeology, a thriving hub for cultural and commercial endeavours, by archaeologists, the local people, and its administration. The necessity to assess additional conservation efforts will undoubtedly reappear in the future, which is why there is interest in methodically gathering the complex of data gathered throughout this forty-year period in accordance with a well defined and finalised technique.

== Archaeological significance ==
The site features a central nuraghe tower surrounded by a village, with continuous occupation from the Nuragic Bronze Age through the Roman and Byzantine periods.

Excavations revealed hut foundations, workshops, and a rare wine press (laccus) dated to the 10th–9th century BCE (Final Bronze Age). Chemical analysis (tartaric acid detection) confirmed the stone press's use for grape processing, making it one of the earliest documented winemaking facilities in the western Mediterranean. Artifacts include Nuragic ceramics, metal tools, and carbonized plant remains (e.g., grape seeds, cereals), illustrating agricultural practices.

== Funerary architecture and ritual significance ==
The Nuragic culture is renowned for its distinctive "giants' tombs" (tombe di giganti), a type of megalithic funerary structure that evolved from earlier Neolithic passage graves. These tombs featured a semicircular forecourt (exedra) used for communal feasting and ritual offerings to the dead, often marked by a central carved stele with a symbolic doorway.

While no giants' tombs have been directly linked to Nuraghe Genna Maria, its status as a complex nuraghe suggests it was part of a broader religious and funerary landscape. The presence of later agrarian cults (Demeter/Ceres) at the site (4th century BCE onward) further supports its ritual importance, possibly continuing earlier Nuragic traditions of ancestor veneration and agricultural rites.

== Regional and Mediterranean connections ==
=== Western Mediterranean megalithic culture ===
Though the Nuragic civilization developed independently in Sardinia, it shared architectural and cultural parallels with contemporary megalithic societies in:

Corsica (Torrean culture)

Balearic Islands (Talaiotic culture)

Pantelleria and Iberia

These similarities suggest shared technological or ideological influences across the Bronze Age western Mediterranean.

=== Eastern Mediterranean trade ===
Excavations at Nuragic sites, including Genna Maria, have uncovered:

Imported pottery (e.g., Cypriot or Mycenaean styles)

Bronze artifacts with Aegean parallels

This indicates long-distance maritime trade networks, possibly facilitated by Nuragic seafaring (e.g., the Sherden, a Sea Peoples group linked to Sardinia).

=== Key implications for Genna Maria ===
Cultural Synthesis: The site reflects both local Nuragic traditions and Mediterranean-wide exchanges.

Ritual Continuity: Its reuse as a Demeter/Ceres sanctuary (5th–4th century BCE) may echo earlier Nuragic ancestor cults.

Trade Hub: Strategic hilltop location allowed control over agricultural and maritime trade routes.

== Genna Maria Archaeological Museum ==
As Sardinia's first civic museum, inaugurated in 1982, the Genna Maria Archaeological Museum occupies the elegant 19th-century Monte di Soccolo building - originally a wheat bank serving local farmers. The museum offers insights into Sardinia's ancient civilizations through its exhibits.

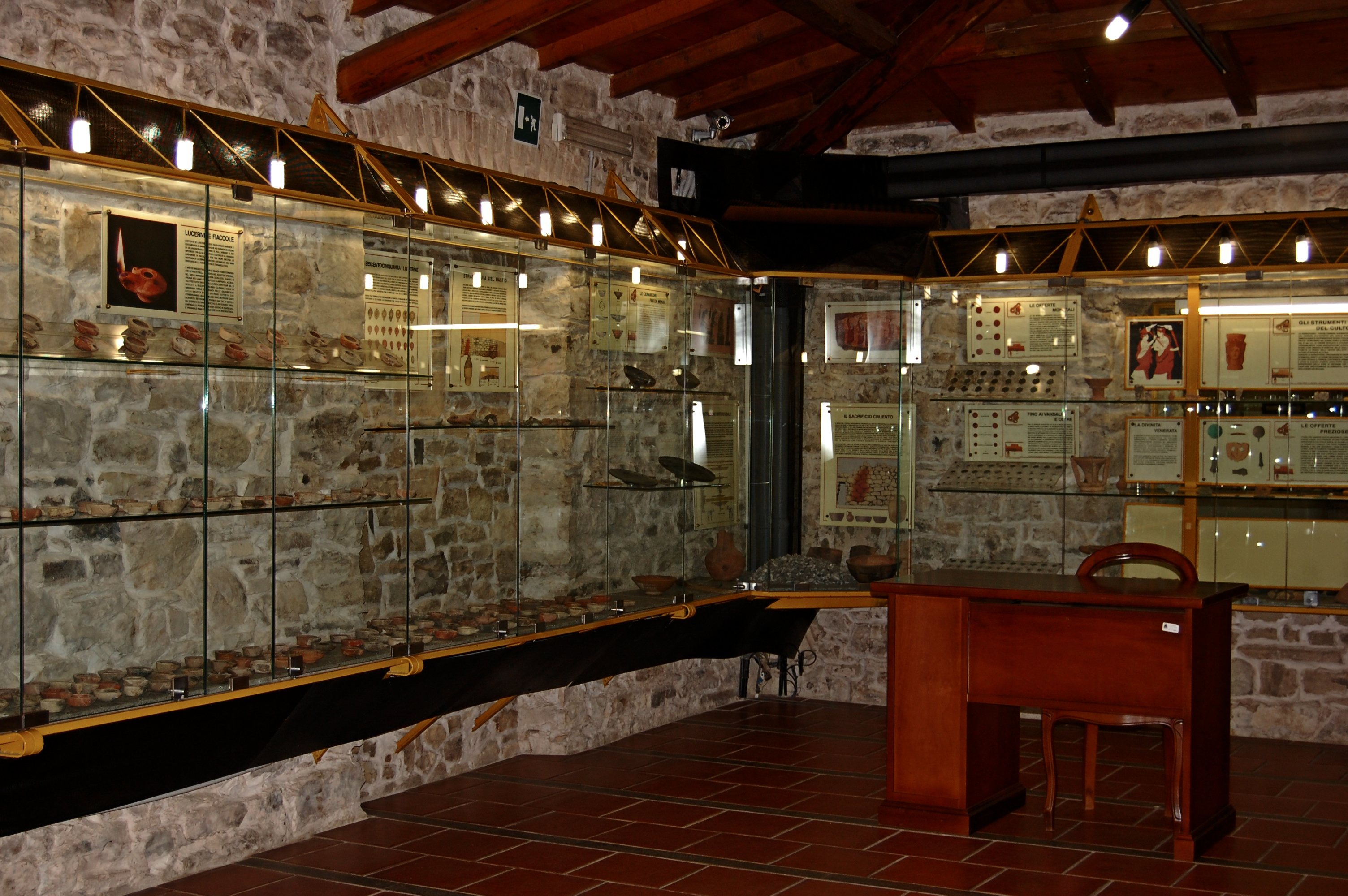
Genna Maria Archaeological Museum

=== Ground floor exhibits ===
The museum's ground floor presents remarkable finds from ongoing excavations at the nearby Nuraghe Genna Maria complex, which began in 1969. The centerpiece is the complete assemblage from the "Central Court House," the village's largest dwelling. Dating to the Iron Age (10th-8th century BCE), these artifacts - preserved in situ after a devastating fire - provide a vivid snapshot of daily Nuragic life. Innovative features include:

Immersive 3D reconstructions tracing the nuraghe's architectural evolution

Tactile exhibits designed for visually impaired visitors

=== Upper floor galleries ===
The upper level comprises several thematic rooms:

Marmilla Territory Room: Showcases artifacts from:

The proto-nuraghe of Giara di Gesturi

The unique stele tomb of Su Quaddu de Nixias (Lunamatrona)

The exceptionally preserved Sa Domu de s'Orcu funerary complex (Giara di Siddi)

Sardinia's oldest finds (Monte Claro period, c. 2500 BCE) from Siddi's domus de janas

Pinn'e Maiolu Village Room: Features the island's only known Nuragic-era water management system, evidenced by an intricate network of channels.

Punic-Roman Room: Displays the rich votive offerings from when the nuraghe served as an agrarian shrine, including:

Hundreds of coins and lamps

Exquisite gold, silver, and bronze artifacts

A collection of millstones and funerary objects

The museum's exceptional curation bridges artifacts with their archaeological contexts, recreating life in a 3,000-year-old settlement. Notable highlights include:

Unique clay objects: portable stoves, arm holders, and specialized cooking vessels

Askoid jugs demonstrating Mediterranean trade connections (parallels found in Crete, Carthage, and Cádiz)

Iconic pintadère (bread-decorating molds) - four specimens from Genna Maria

Remarkable ziri (food storage jars) repaired with lead flakes preserving ancient linen impressions

A reconstructed prehistoric loom showcasing Nuragic textile production

This museum stands as an essential destination for understanding Sardinia's Nuragic civilization, its technological achievements, and its Mediterranean connections through expertly presented artifacts in their historical context.

As an important Nuragic site of Sardinia, Genna Maria provides insights into the island's Bronze Age society - their architectural achievements, metallurgical expertise, and connections with the wider Mediterranean world. Ongoing research continues to reveal new details about this sophisticated prehistoric culture.
