= Church of Santiago de los Caballeros =

Iglesia de Santiago
- Church of Santiago de los Caballeros
- Templo Matriz y Arcipreztal de Santiago de Los Caballeros de Gáldar
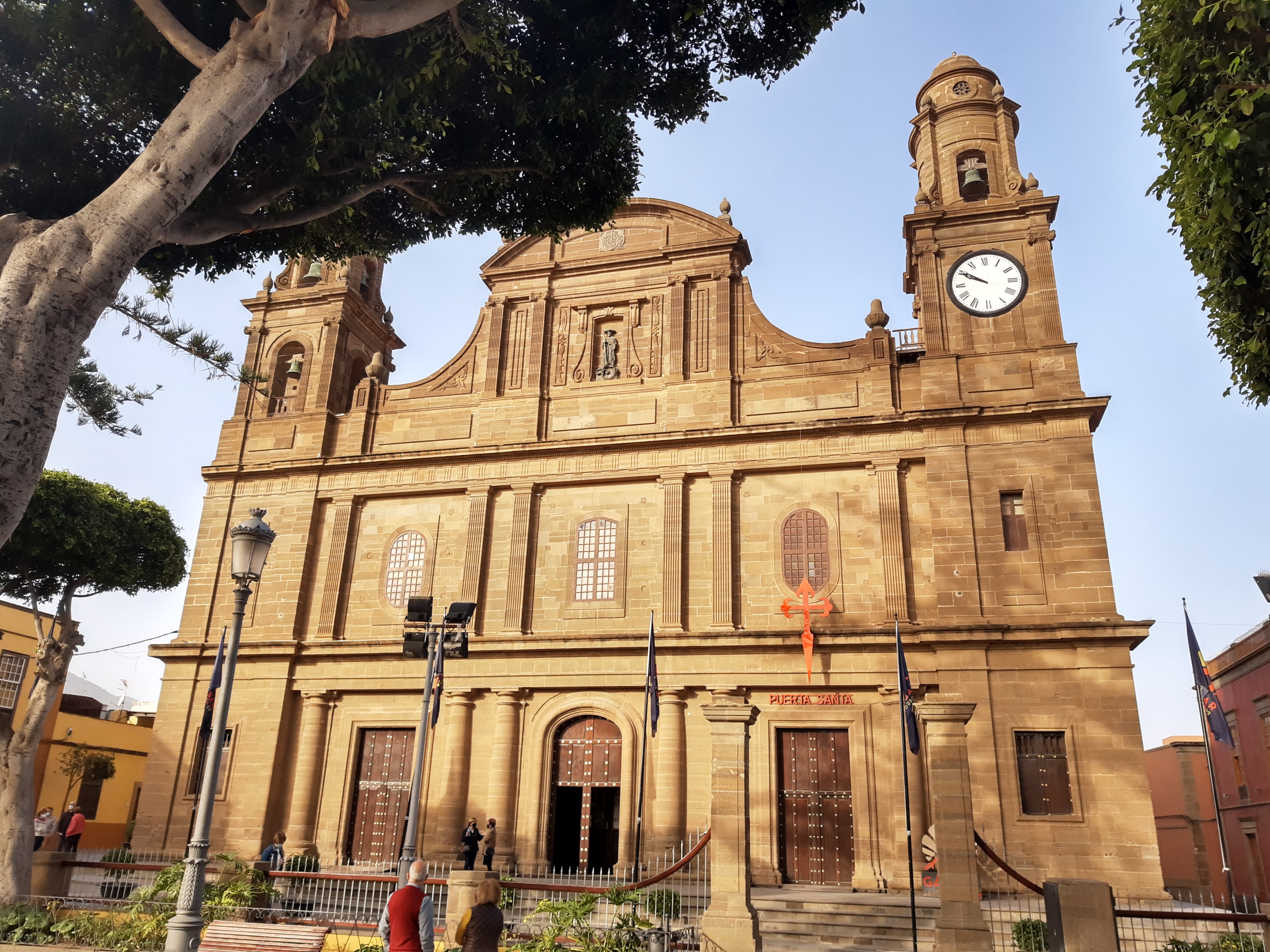

- 28°08′42″N 15°39′22″W
- Location: Gáldar, Gran Canaria
- Country: Spain
- Denomination: Catholic
- Website: jacobeogaldar.es/lugaresdeinteres/templodesantiago

History
- Dedication: Saint James

Architecture
- Functional status: active
- Heritage designation: RI-51-0008728
- Designated: 1978
- Architect: Diego Nicolás Eduardo
- Style: Neoclassical
- Groundbreaking: 1778
- Completed: 1826

Administration
- Diocese: Diocese of Canarias

The Church of Santiago de los Caballeros (Spanish: Iglesia Matriz de Santiago de Los Caballeros) is a Catholic church and parish in Gáldar, Gran Canaria, Canary Islands, Spain.

== Background ==
The present building in neoclassical style was built from 1778 to 1826. The full name is Templo Matriz y Arcipreztal de Santiago de Los Caballeros de Gáldar. It is dedicated to James the Apostle.
