= Gregorio Chil y Naranjo =

Spanish historian (1831–1901)

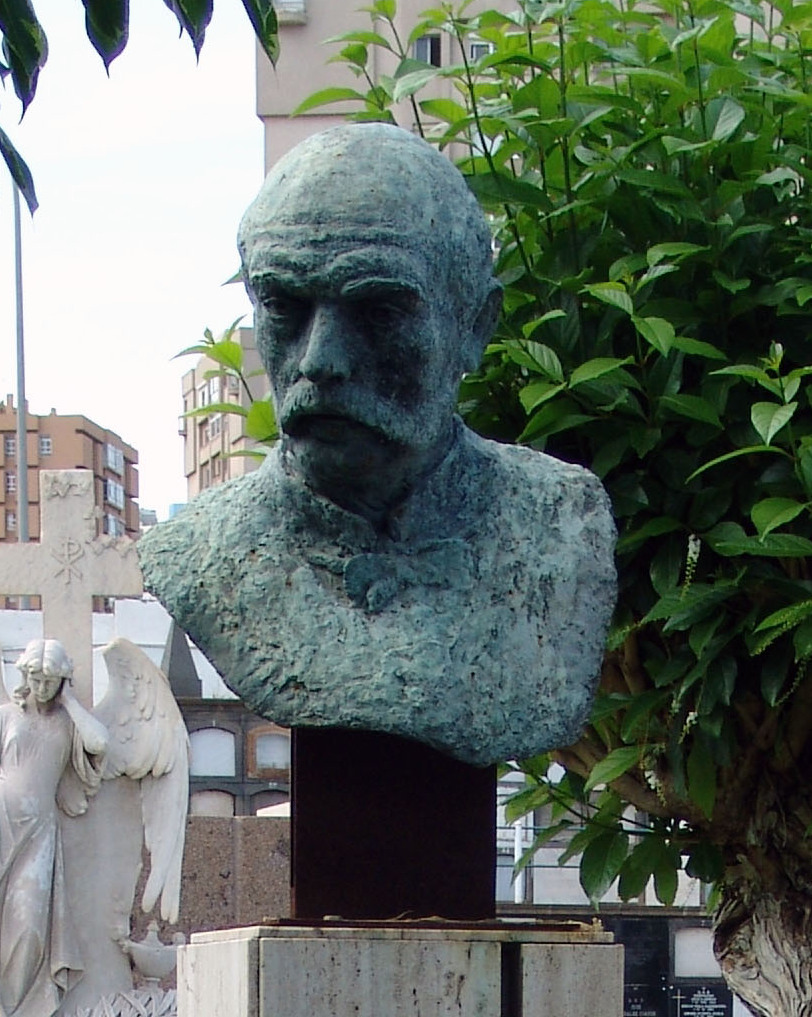
- A monument to Chil in Las Palmas
- Born: 13 March 1831; Telde, Spain
- Died: 4 July 1901 (aged 70); Las Palmas, Spain

Gregorio Chil y Naranjo (born 13 March 1831, Telde, Gran Canaria, died 4 July 1901 Las Palmas) was a Spanish doctor, historian and anthropologist.

== Biography ==
Chil was educated at home by his father before attending the Conciliary Seminary of Las Palmas, from which he graduated in 1847. Initially intending to study for the priesthood, he decided to study medicine in Paris, for which he received financial assistance from his uncle, the parochial vicar of the church of San Juan Bautista in Telde.

From 1848, he studied in Paris, gaining a Bachelor of Medicine and Surgery and completing his doctorate in 1857. During this time, he acquired an interest in anthropology. After a brief period at the University of Cadiz, he returned to Gran Canaria and set up practice in Las Palmas. During this time he would frequently travel to attend anthropological conferences. He dedicated considerable time to the scientific and historical investigation of the first settlers of the Canary Islands. He read all he could by the ancient historians and chroniclers, and gathered as many objects and remains as he could: mummies, skulls, bones, ceramics, textiles and other objects. These would become part of the Museo Canario collection.

More than fifteen years of research resulted in the publication of Estudios históricos, climatológicos y patológicos de las islas Canarias. It was initially published in 1876, and was well received in the Canary Islands. However, on 30 April 1876 the Bishop of the Diocese of the Canary Islands, José María Urquinaona y Bidot initiated proceedings for excommunication, due to his agreement with the Society of Anthropology of Paris that defended the theories of Jean-Baptiste Lamarck and Charles Darwin on human origins.

In 1879 a group of intellectuals led by Dr. Gregorio Chil y Naranjo founded the Museo Canario, which was initially based on the third floor of the Las Palmas City Hall. The museum was Chil's most important contribution to the Canary Islands. He retained his ties to this institution all his life, and devoted most of his work to it, occupying the position of director of the institution while his health permitted it.

Gregorio Chil y Naranjo died of heart disease at the age of 70 on 4 July 1901. In his will he declared that, upon the death of his wife, Rosenda Suárez Tascón, the house in which both had resided in the street of the Colegio de Las Palmas would become the headquarters of the Museo Canario.
