= Pintadera =

Clay stamp formerly used in the Sardinia Islands

Pintaderas are a form of stamp used by the pre-Hispanic natives of the Canary Islands. They were commonly made of fired clay. However, a number of wooden pintaderas have also been found. Most pintaderas come from archaeological sites in Gran Canaria, although natives from other islands in the Canarian archipelago used them too. Pintaderas were usually decorated with ornate geometric shapes, including zigzags, triangles, rectangles, squares and circles. These decorative motifs are similar to those found on pre-Hispanic Canarian pottery. Similar geometric patterns can also be seen in pre-Hispanic Canarian rock art (e.g., Painted cave of Galdar)

The size of the pintaderas varies significantly, ranging between 2 and 12 cm. They usually have a small handle, which is sometimes pierced, that allows the owner to hang the stamp from a string.

The function of the pintaderas is unclear. Perhaps they were used by the natives to apply natural dyes to their body as a form of decoration. Alternatively, they may have been used to mark sealed grain silos with the owner's personal emblem.

Collections of pintaderas are housed at the Museo de la Naturaleza y el Hombre (Tenerife), El Museo Canario (Gran Canaria) and Painted cave, Gáldar (Gran Canaria).

Pintadera stamps were also used in the first agricultural settlements in Europe and the Anatolian homeland these farmers came from.
