= Gáldar =

- Municipality
- Gáldar

- Flag Coat of arms

- Municipal location in Gran Canaria

- Location in the province of Las Palmas Gáldar (Canary Islands) Gáldar (Spain, Canary Islands)
- Coordinates: 28°8′38″N 15°39′1″W
- Country: Spain
- Autonomous Community: Canary Islands
- Province: Las Palmas
- Island: Gran Canaria

Government
  - Mayor: Teodoro Claret Sosa Monzón

Area
  - Total: 61.59 km^{2} (23.78 sq mi)
- Elevation (AMSL): 124 m (407 ft)

Population (2025-01-01)
  - Total: 25,108
  - Density: 407.7/km^{2} (1,056/sq mi)
- Time zone: UTC+0 (CET)
  - Summer (DST): UTC+1 (CEST (GMT +1))
- Postal code: 35460
- Area code: +34 (Spain) + 928 (Las Palmas)
- Website: www.galdar.es

Gáldar is a town and a Spanish municipality in the north of the island of Gran Canaria in the Province of Las Palmas in the Canary Islands. Its population is 24,227 (2013), and the area is 61.59 km^{2} (23.78 sq mi).

The town Gáldar is situated at the foot of the mountains, 2 km from the coast and 21 km (13 mi) west of Las Palmas. The GC-2 motorway passes south of the town. The municipality includes the settlements Puerto de Sardina, San Isidro, Los Quintanas, Barrial and Marmolejos. The main church is dedicated to Saint James.

It holds the Painted cave, a major archaeological site consisting of a remarkable painted cave and an entire pre-Hispanic village visited yearly by over 50,000 people.

== Gáldar International Film Festival ==
Also known as FIC Gáldar, the festival stands out as an annual event that brings together narrative feature-length and short films in competition, from different nationalities around the world. Organized by Gáldar City Hall through its Council of Culture, it established in 2013, becoming one of Spain's most important film festivals ever since.

In addition to the competition and film screening sections, the Gáldar International Film Festival seeks to pay homage to the cinematographic industry. Exhibitions and parallel activities are organized to enrich the experience of participants and the audiences.

== Population ==
Historical population

Year	Pop.	±%
1991	20,656	—
1996	21,704	+5.1%
2001	22,154	+2.1%
2002	22,677	+2.4%

Year	Pop.	±%
2003	22,763	+0.4%
2004	22,922	+0.7%
2011	24,361	+6.3%
2013	24,227	−0.6%

== Gallery ==
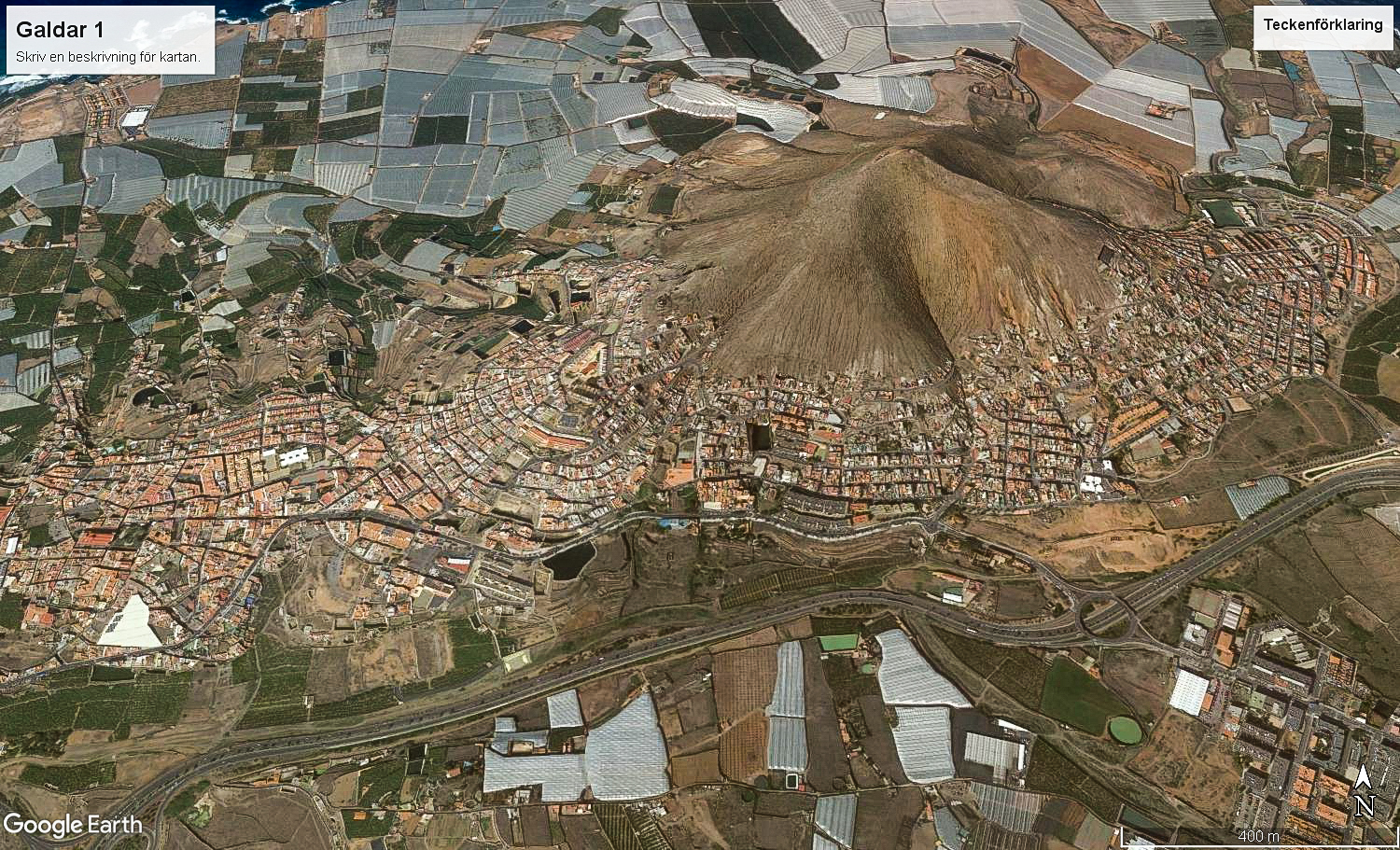
Gáldar from space

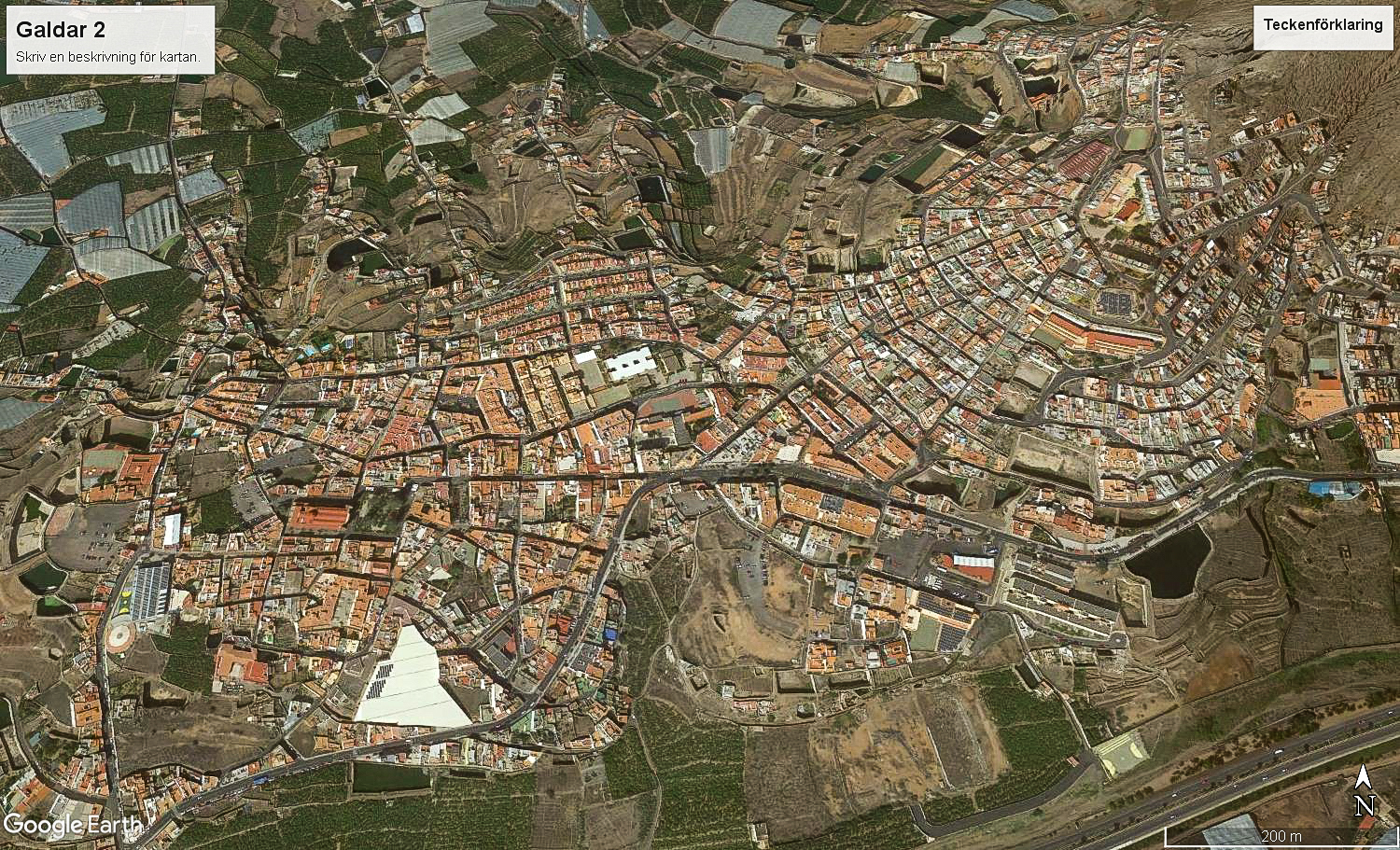
Gáldar from space

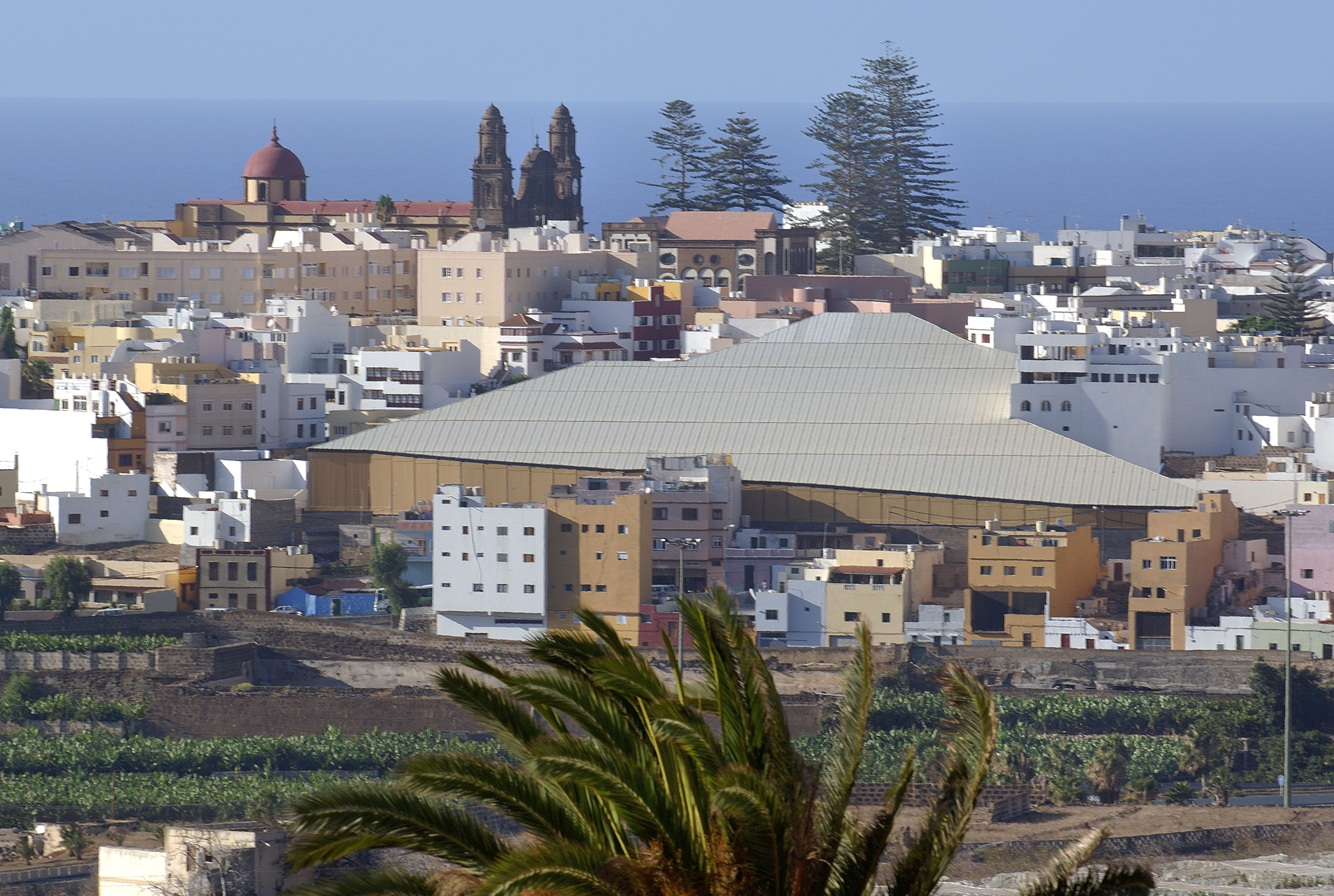
Gáldar

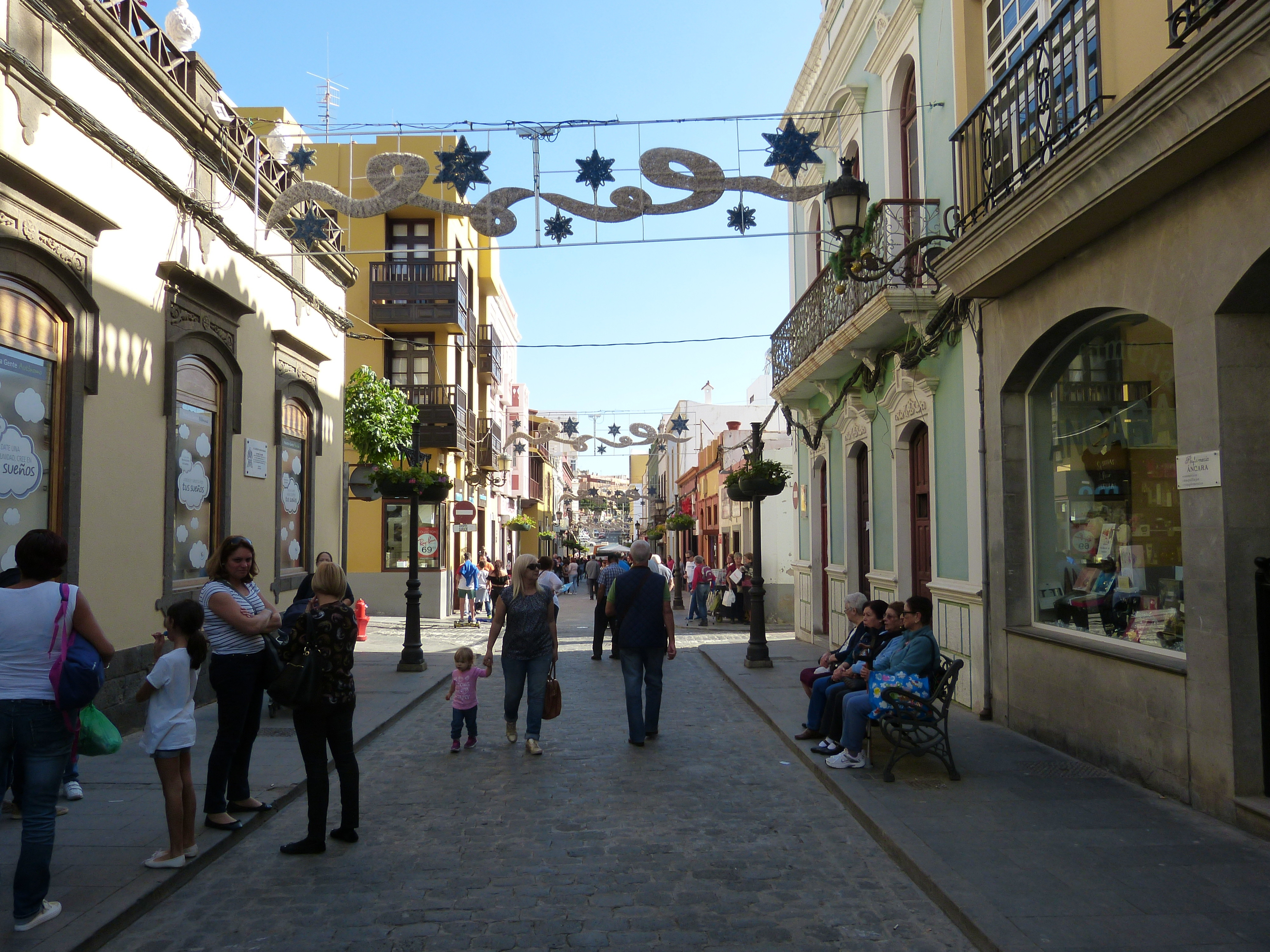
Gáldar - Calle Capitan Quesada

== See also ==
- List of municipalities in Las Palmas
