= Pre-colonial history of the Canary Islands =

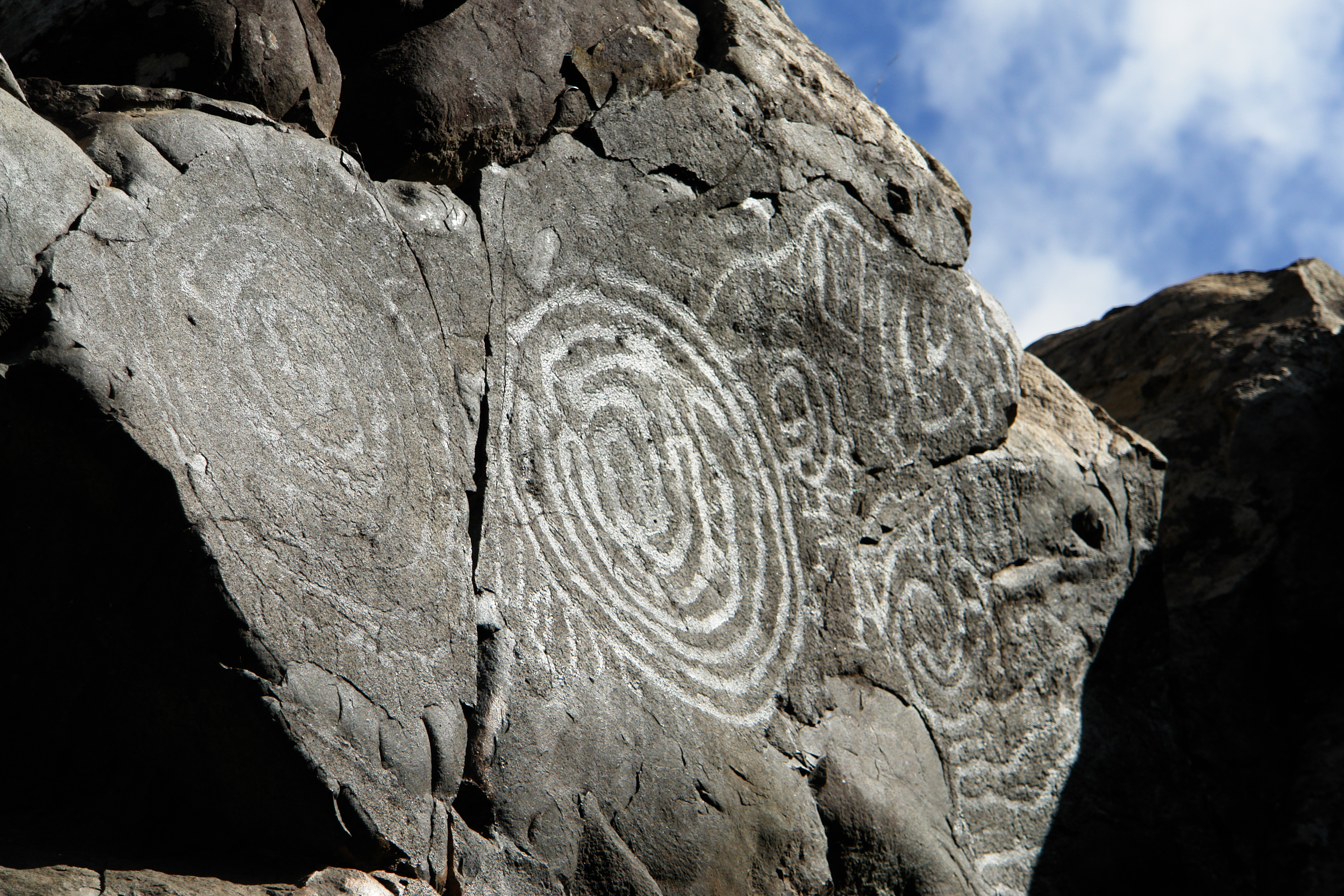
Petroglyph in the island of La Palma

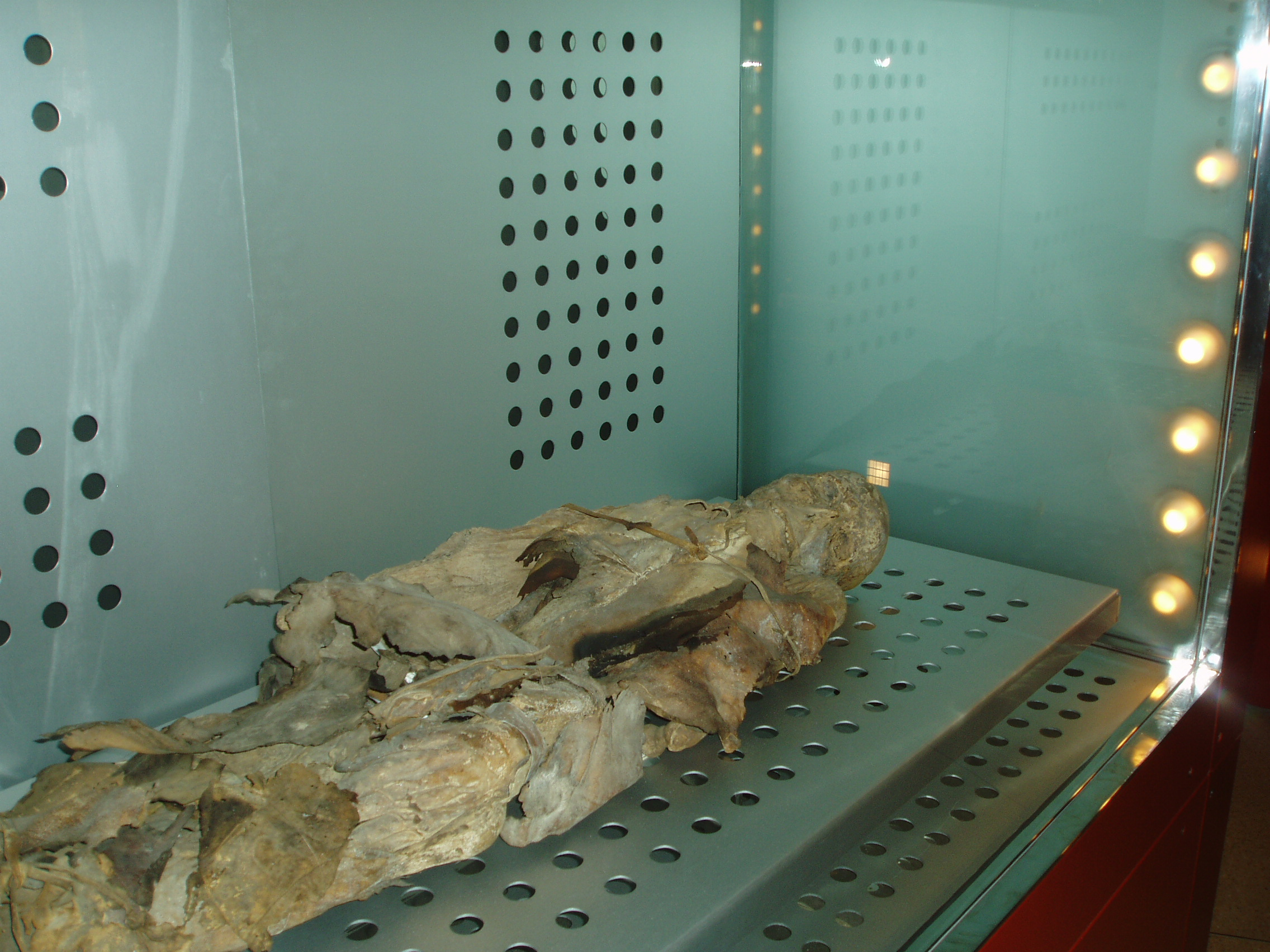
Mummy of San Andrés

The Canary Islands have been known since antiquity. An indigenous population, hypothesized to be of North African Berber origin, lived in these islands until the Spanish colonization, between 1402 and 1496.

The islands were visited by the Phoenicians, the Greeks and the Carthaginians. According to the 1st century CE Roman author and philosopher Pliny the Elder, the archipelago was found to be uninhabited, but ruins of great buildings were seen. This story may suggest that the islands were inhabited by other peoples prior to the Guanches.

At the time of medieval European engagement, the Canary Islands were inhabited by a variety of indigenous communities. The pre-colonial population of the Canaries is generically referred to as Guanches, although, strictly speaking, Guanches were originally the inhabitants of Tenerife. According to the chronicles, the inhabitants of Fuerteventura and Lanzarote were referred to as Maxos, Gran Canaria was inhabited by the Canarii, El Hierro by the Bimbaches, La Palma by the Auaritas and La Gomera by the Gomeros. Evidence does seem to suggest that inter-insular interaction was relatively low and each island was populated by its own distinct socio-cultural groups who lived in relative isolation separated from each other.

== Historical background ==
The origins of the Canarian indigenous people remain the subject of debate. Numerous theories have achieved varying degrees of acceptance. The excavation work has provided an ample series of radio-carbon dates. According to archaeology professor Pablo Atoche, "human colonization of the Canary Islands started to somewhere close to the change from the II to the I millennium BC." Canary Island proto-history started with the initial colonization of Phoenicia -circa 10th to 6th centuries BC.

Various Mediterranean civilizations in antiquity knew of the islands' existence and established contact with them. Visitors included Phoenicians, Greeks and Carthaginians. According to Pliny the Elder, an expedition of Mauretanians sent by King Juba II (d. 23 CE) to the archipelago visited the islands, finding them uninhabited, but noting ruins of great buildings. When King Juba, the Roman protégé, dispatched a contingent to re-open the dye production facility at Mogador (historical name of Essaouira, Morocco) in the early 1st century, Juba's naval force was subsequently sent on an exploration of the Canary Islands, using Mogador as their mission base.

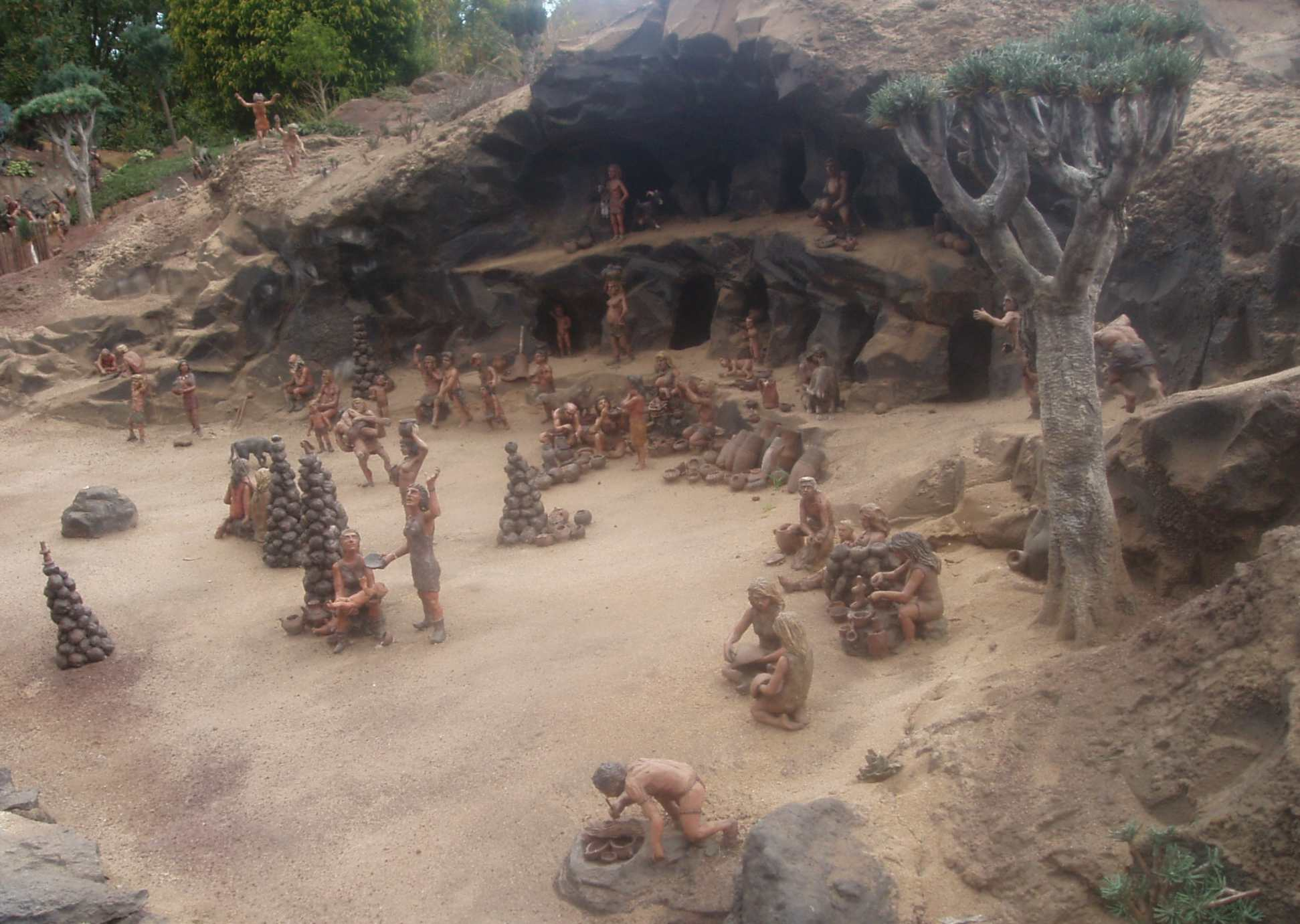
Reconstruction of a Guanche settlement of Tenerife

Pico de la Zarza, the highest point of Fuerteventura, can be seen on clear days from the African coast. The Carthaginian captain Hanno the Navigator may have visited the islands during his voyage of exploration along the African coast. The Phoenicians may have arrived seeking the precious red orchil dye extracted from lichen – if the Canaries represent Pliny the Elder's Purple Isles or the Hesperides of legend. Although no evidence has survived of any permanent Roman settlements, in 1964 Roman amphorae were discovered in waters off Lanzarote. Discoveries made in the 1990s have demonstrated in more definite detail that the Romans traded with the indigenous inhabitants. Excavations of a settlement at El Bebedero on Lanzarote, made by a team under Pablo Atoche Peña of the University of Las Palmas de Gran Canaria and Juan Ángel Paz Peralta of the University of Zaragoza, yielded about a hundred Roman potsherds, nine pieces of metal and one piece of glass at the site, in strata dated between the 1st and 4th centuries. Analysis of the clay indicated origins in Campania, Hispania Baetica and the province of Africa (modern Tunisia).

The Romans named each of the islands: Ninguaria or Nivaria (Tenerife), Canaria (Gran Canaria), Pluvialia or Invale (Lanzarote), Ombrion (La Palma), Planasia (Fuerteventura), Iunonia or Junonia (El Hierro) and Capraria (La Gomera).

From the 14th century onward, sailors from Mallorca, Portugal and Genoa made numerous visits. Lancelotto Malocello settled on the island of Lanzarote in 1312. The Mayorcans established a mission with a bishop that lasted from 1350 to 1400. It is from this mission that the various paintings and statues of the Virgin Mary that are currently venerated in the island were preserved. European disembarkations of Genovese, Castilian and Portuguese missionaries and pirates on Canarian shores became relatively common and the prehispanic populations experienced a long and ongoing process of Westernisation before formal colonization took place.

A variety of theories regarding the origins of pre-colonial Canarians explain them by the hypothesis of a more recent immigration. Some scholars (mainly from the University of La Laguna, in Tenerife) defend the theory that the Canarian populations are Punic-Phoenician in origin. Professor D. Juan Álvarez Delgado, on the other hand, argued that the Canaries remained uninhabited until 100 BCE, when Greek and Roman sailors began to explore the area. In the second half of the 1st century BCE, King Juba II of Numidia abandoned North African prisoners on the islands, who eventually became the pre-Hispanic Canarians. If the first inhabitants were abandoned prisoners, this explains, according to Álvarez Delgado, their lack of navigational acumen.

Genetic analysis using mitochondrial DNA points to the Moroccan Berbers as the African population most closely related to the Guanches.

== Archaeology ==
Archaeology suggests that the original settlers arrived by sea, importing domestic animals such as goats, sheep, pigs and dogs and grains such as wheat, barley and lentils. They also brought with them a set of well-defined socio-cultural practices that seem to have originated and been in use for a long period of time elsewhere.

Today, archaeological and ethnographic studies have led most scholars to accept the view that the pre-colonial population of the Canaries shared common origins with North African Berber tribes from the Atlas Mountains region who began to arrive in the Canaries by sea around 1000 BCE or earlier. However, there is no archaeological or historical evidence to prove that either the Berber tribes of the Atlas Mountains or the Canarian pre-colonial population had knowledge or made use of navigation techniques. The peak of Tenerife is visible from the African coast on the very clearest of days, but the currents around the islands tend to lead the boats southwest and west, past the archipelago and into the Atlantic Ocean.

Most scholars would now agree that the earliest reliable dates related to permanent human occupation can be traced back to about 1000 BCE, but different absolute dating technologies such as carbon-14 and thermoluminescence have provided variable results. Inadequate methodologies and an insufficient number of absolute datings carried out throughout the archipelago have yielded inconsistencies and information gaps.

According to a 2024 study by the University of Las Palmas de Gran Canaria, there is archaeological evidence that the Romans were the first to colonise the islands, during the period from the 1st century BCE to the 1st century CE. There was no overlap with the occupation by the people who were inhabiting the islands at the time of the Spanish conquest, who had first arrived sometime between the 1st and 3rd centuries CE.

Studies of precolonial Canarian society illustrate both agricultural and pastoral ways of life in the Canaries. Archaeological research in Gran Canaria has found a relatively high prevalence of auricular exostosis among Pre-Hispanic craniums, reaching 34.35% in coastal burial places. Not all coastal craniums presented exostosis but there were no differences between sexes. Researchers thus proposed a social division of work among the Canarii, with certain individuals, male or female, specializing in fishing by immersion and swimming.

== Population genetics ==
A 2003 genetics research article by Nicole Maca-Meyer et al. published in the European Journal of Human Genetics compared mitochondrial DNA (mtDNA, inherited matrilineally) from aboriginal Guanche (collected from Canarian archaeological sites) to mtDNA of today's Canarians and concluded that, "despite the continuous changes suffered by the population (Spanish colonisation, slave trade), aboriginal mtDNA lineages constitute a considerable proportion [42 – 73%] of the Canarian gene pool. Although the Berbers are the most probable ancestors of the Guanches, it is deduced that important human movements [e.g., the Islamic-Arabic conquest of the Berbers] have reshaped Northwest Africa after the migratory wave to the Canary Islands" and the "results support, from a maternal perspective, the supposition that since the end of the 16th century, at least, two-thirds of the Canarian population had an indigenous substrate, as was previously inferred from historical and anthropological data." mtDNA haplogroup U subclade U6b1 is Canarian-specific and is the most common mtDNA haplogroup found in aboriginal Guanche archaeological burial sites.

Lineages of Y-DNA (inherited patrilineally) were analysed in a later study by Rosa Fregel and colleagues published in BMC Evolutionary Biology. Y-DNA was extracted from the same aboriginal Guanche samples used by Nicole Maca-Meyer et al., and compared to samples from 17th-18th century remains post-dating the Spanish conquest of the islands, and samples from the present population. They found Berber Y-chromosome lineages (E-M81, E-M78 and J-M267) prominent in the indigenous remains, confirming the North West African origin for the Guanches deduced Nicole Maca-Meyer et al. from mitochondrial DNA results. "However, in contrast with their female lineages, which have survived in the present-day population since the conquest with only a moderate decline, the male indigenous lineages have dropped constantly being substituted by European lineages." They conclude that the European colonization of the Canary Islands changed the local gene-pool most dramatically in the male line.

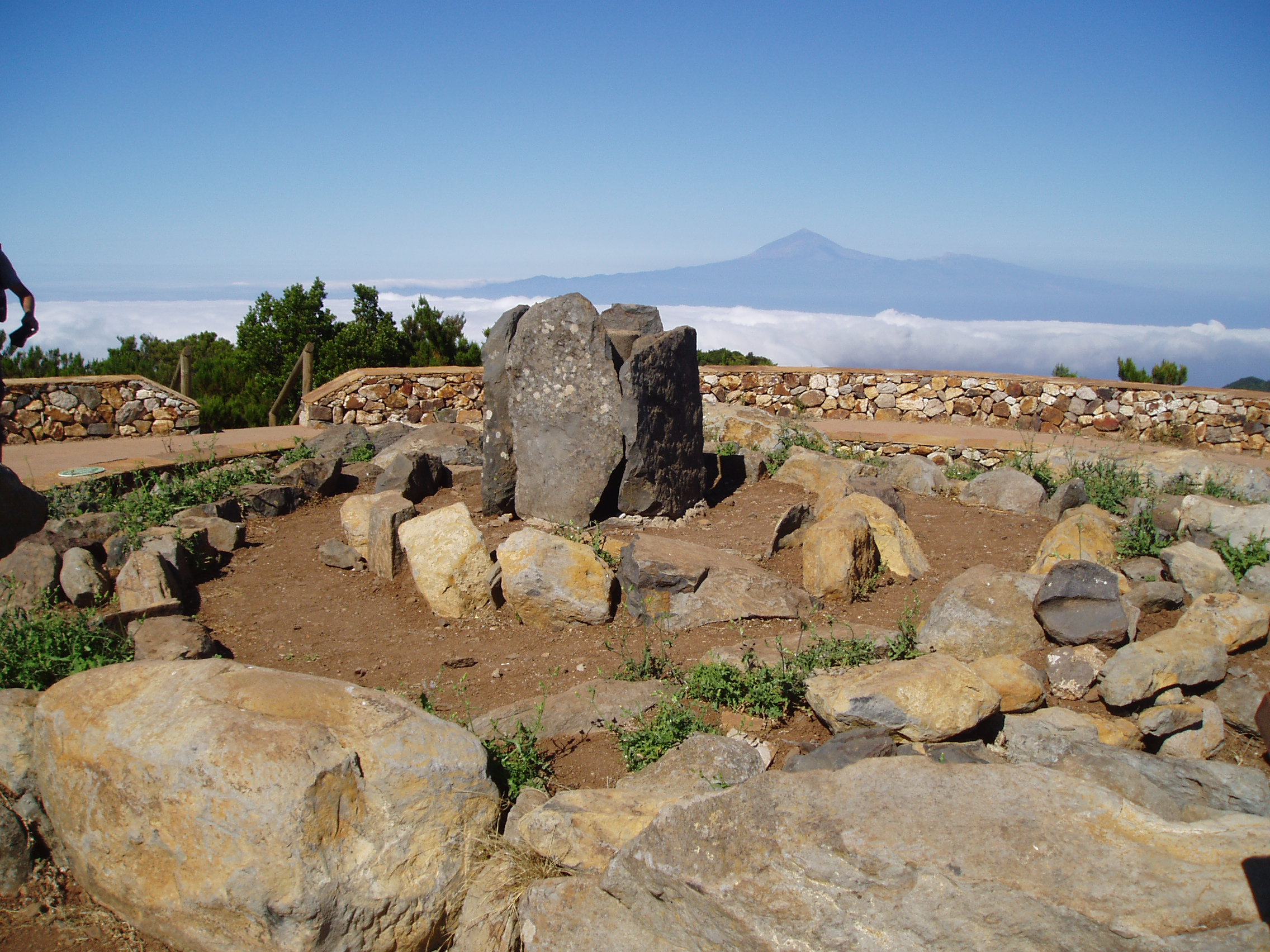
Reproduction of a Guanche sanctuary in the Garajonay National Park - La Gomera Island with the Teide volcano (highest peak in Spain) on Tenerife island in the background

== Society ==
Although denied by certain scholars (cf. Abreu Galindo 1977: 297), specialisation of labour and a hierarchy system seem to have governed the social structures of the Canarian precolonial populations. In Tenerife the highest figure was known as the Mencey, although, by the time the first Spanish incursions in the Canaries took place, Tenerife had already been divided into nine menceyatos (i.e. separate regions of the island controlled by its own Mencey), namely Anaga, Tegueste, Tacoronte, Taoro, Icod, Daute, Adeje, Abona and Güimar. Despite the fact that all Menceys were independent and absolute owners of their territory within the island, it was the Mencey of Taoro who acted, according to the chronicles, as primus inter pares. Gran Canaria, on the other hand, appears to have been divided into two guanartematos (i.e. functionally, politically and structurally differentiated regions): Telde and Gáldar, each governed by a Guanarteme.

Little information has survived regarding the religious and cosmological beliefs of the Guanches. Indigenous Canarian people often performed their religious practices in places marked by particular striking geographical features or types of vegetation. Certain sites containing architectonic remains and cave paintings have been identified as sanctuaries.

== See also ==
- Genetic history of North Africa
