= Four Doors cave site, Telde =

Four Doors Cave
- native names: Cuatro Puertas, Montaña Bermeja
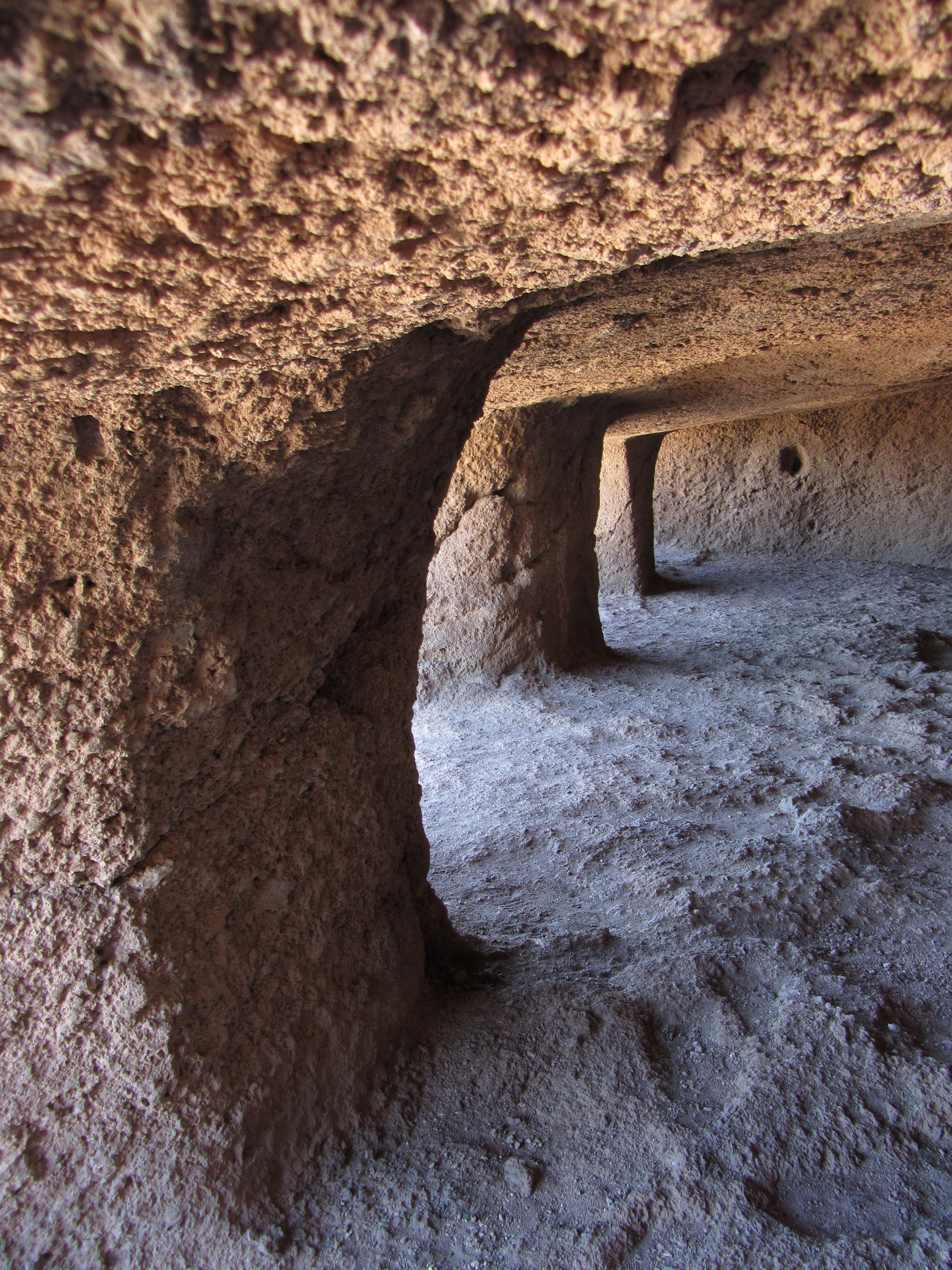

- Location of the Four Doors Cave on Gran Canaria in the Canary Islands
- Location: Telde municipality, Gran Canaria, province of Las Palmas, Canary Islands (Spain)
- Coordinates: 27°57′51.846″N 15°25′06.5856″WGoogle maps
- Elevation: 315 m (1,033 ft)
- Website: (in Spanish)

Four Doors Cave
- Cuatro Puertas, Montaña Bermeja (Spanish)
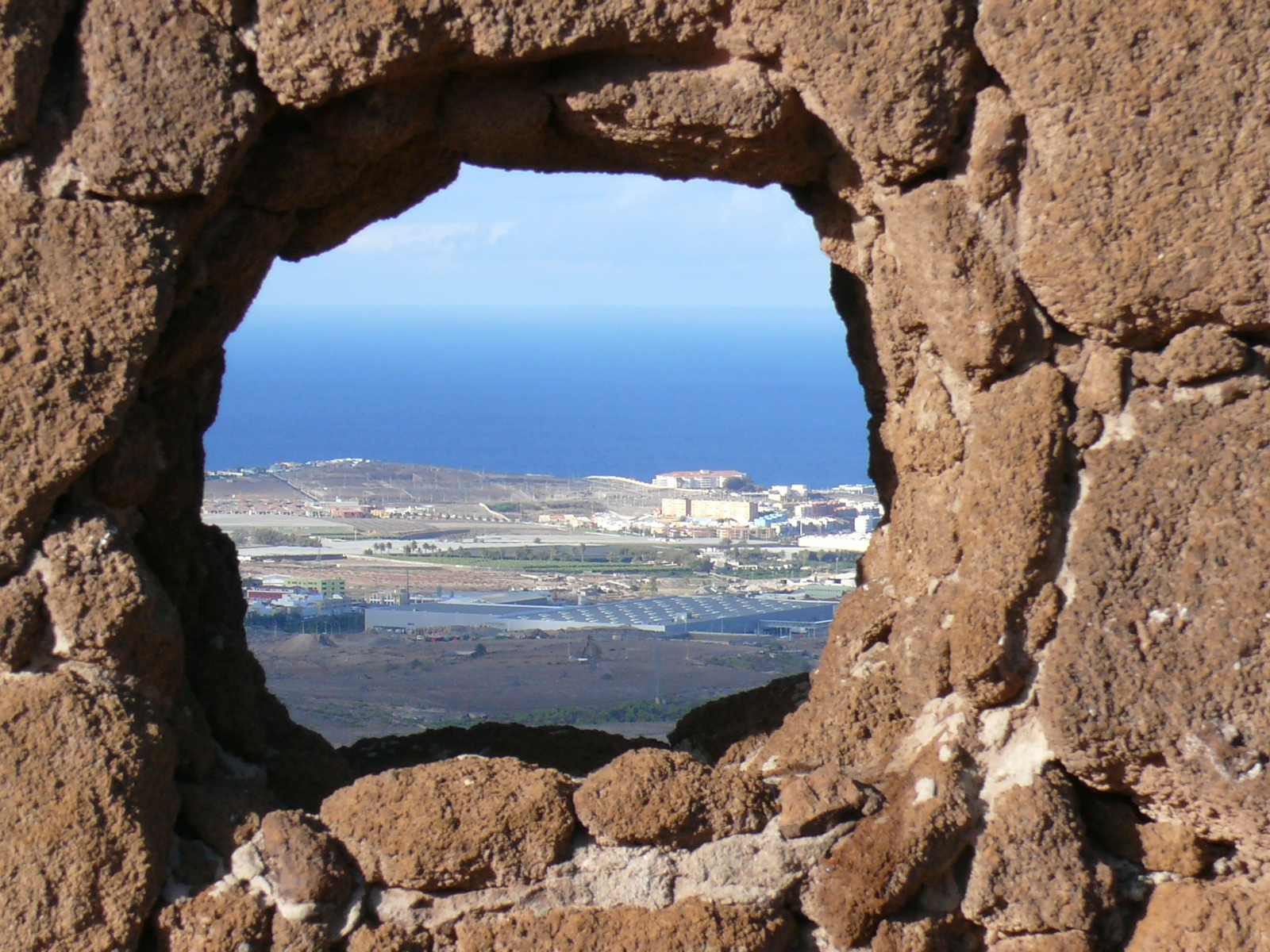
- View from the Four Doors site

- Location of Cuatro Puertas on Gran Canaria, off the coast of Africa
- 27°57′51.846″N 15°25′06.5856″W
- Type: cave
- Nearest city: Telde and Ingenio

Spanish Cultural Heritage
- Official name: Cuatro Puertas
- Type: Archaeological site
- Designated: May 25, 1972

The Four Doors (in Spanish Cuatro Puertas) site, also known as Montaña Bermeja, 'Vermillion Mountain', is a complex of caves in the south of the municipality of Telde, Gran Canaria.

The Cuatro Puertas site is named after its most spectacular cave, the most emblematic of Gran Canaria due to its uniqueness and location. The site includes many other caves, some linked with each other. A small village nearby also bears that name, as well as a ravine (barranco de Cuatro Puertas).

The site is listed as Spanish Heritage as a Property of cultural interest.

== Location ==
Cuatro Puertas and Montaña Bermeja are 6 km away from the east coast of the island of Gran Canaria, on the east side of the GC-100 road that links Telde (5 km north) to Ingenio (8 km south).

The Cuatro Puertas hamlet, situated near the top of Montaña Bermeja, is of easy access: the GC-1 highway and Gran Canaria airport are only 6 km east. The caves' site itself is to the east of the village, after about 500 m (~1,500 ft) of an easy footpath.

== Description ==
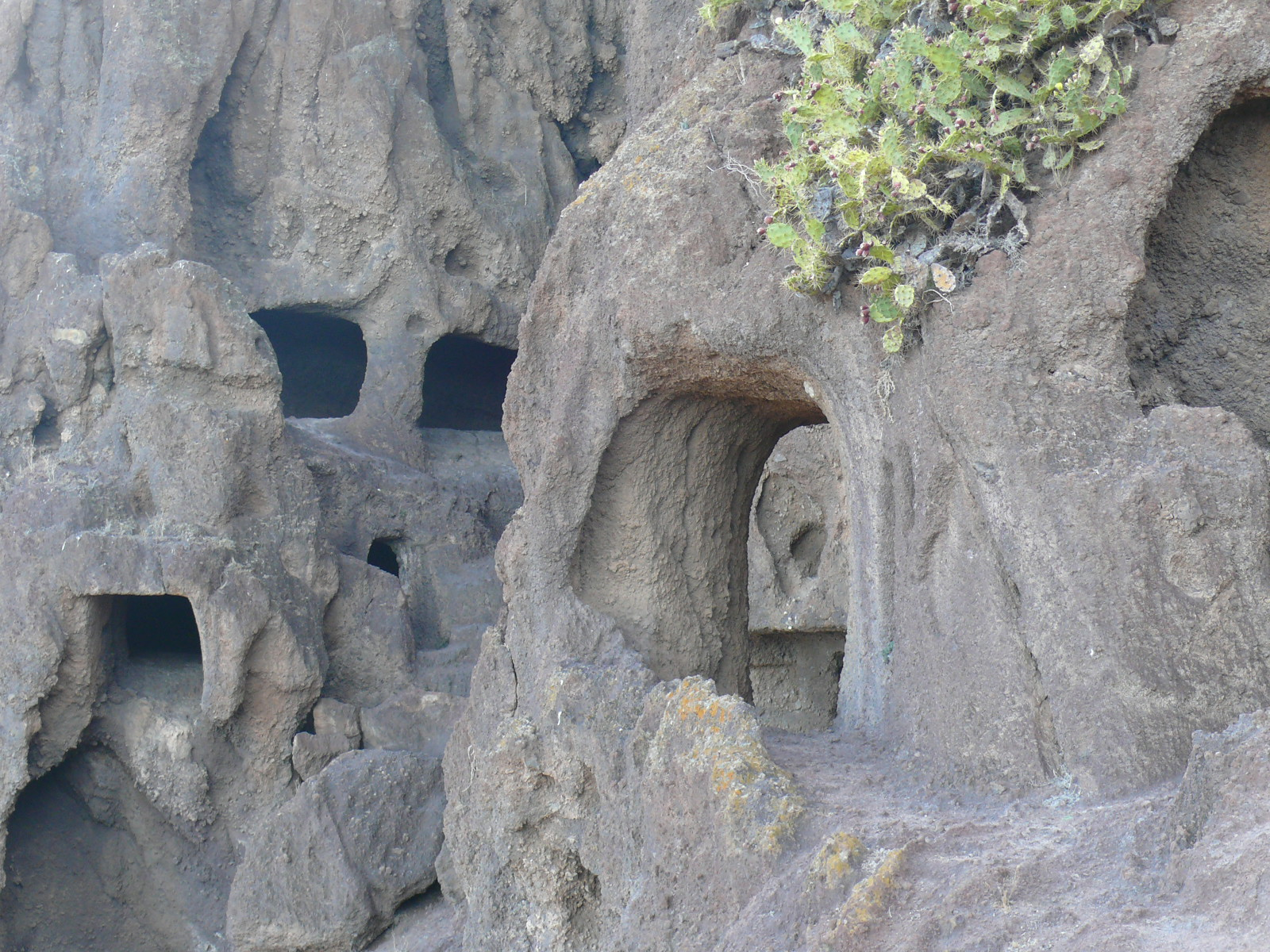
Part of the site of caves

Beside its most spectacular cave that gave its name to the whole complex, the site includes several groups of caves, an uncommon ceremonial place, granaries, paths and alleys. The whole was dug in tuff with stone picks by the pre-Hispanic Canarians.

Other caves include the cueva de los Papeles ("the Papers' cave"), cueva de los Pilares ("the Pillars' cave"), cueva de la Audiencia ("the Audience cave") and the cantera de Molinos (quarry for grindstones). Most caves consist of a main central space with smaller rooms opening onto it. The caves were most likely shut off with dry stone walls. The main room may have been partitioned with light structures (for example of animal skins) or with stone alignments.

The site covers practically the whole of Bermeja mount, although only the upper part can be visited.

The chronicles of the conquest hardly mention it, even though it is only 4 km away from the Conquest tower that stands in Gando's sandy bay (nowadays this tower is used as the museum of Military Aviation).

=== Four Doors cave (Cuatro Puertas) ===
The Four Doors cave, or Cuatro Puertas cave, in the northern part of Montaña Bermeja and near the summit, is a 17 X 7 metres man-made cave opening towards the north-east, dug in tuff and provided with four large doors, all opening onto the same large space. These doors may have been shut by some coverings, made of skins or other materials.
Outside, just beyond the porch thus formed, are a series of about 20 post-holes that show that the whole space was enclosed on the outside.

Numerous deliberate arrangements have been recently made to the tuff walls and floors of the Four Doors cave with the aim of achieving a correct orientation to observe the summer solstice.

==== Use ====
The cave's use is not clear. But because of the type and position of the location, the cave's monumental aspect, the closeness of the almogarén, and the descriptions of other similar sites in the ethnohistoric chronicles of the conquest, most archaeologists believe that it may have been a sacred place where the worship and rituals were carried out directly by the faycán (Note: The faycán was a religious leader in the pre-Hispanic guanche society, and likely an adviser to the mencey or local king.) and the harimaguadas (virgin priestesses under the authority of the faycán, daughters of the nobles).

=== Ritual place (almogarén) ===
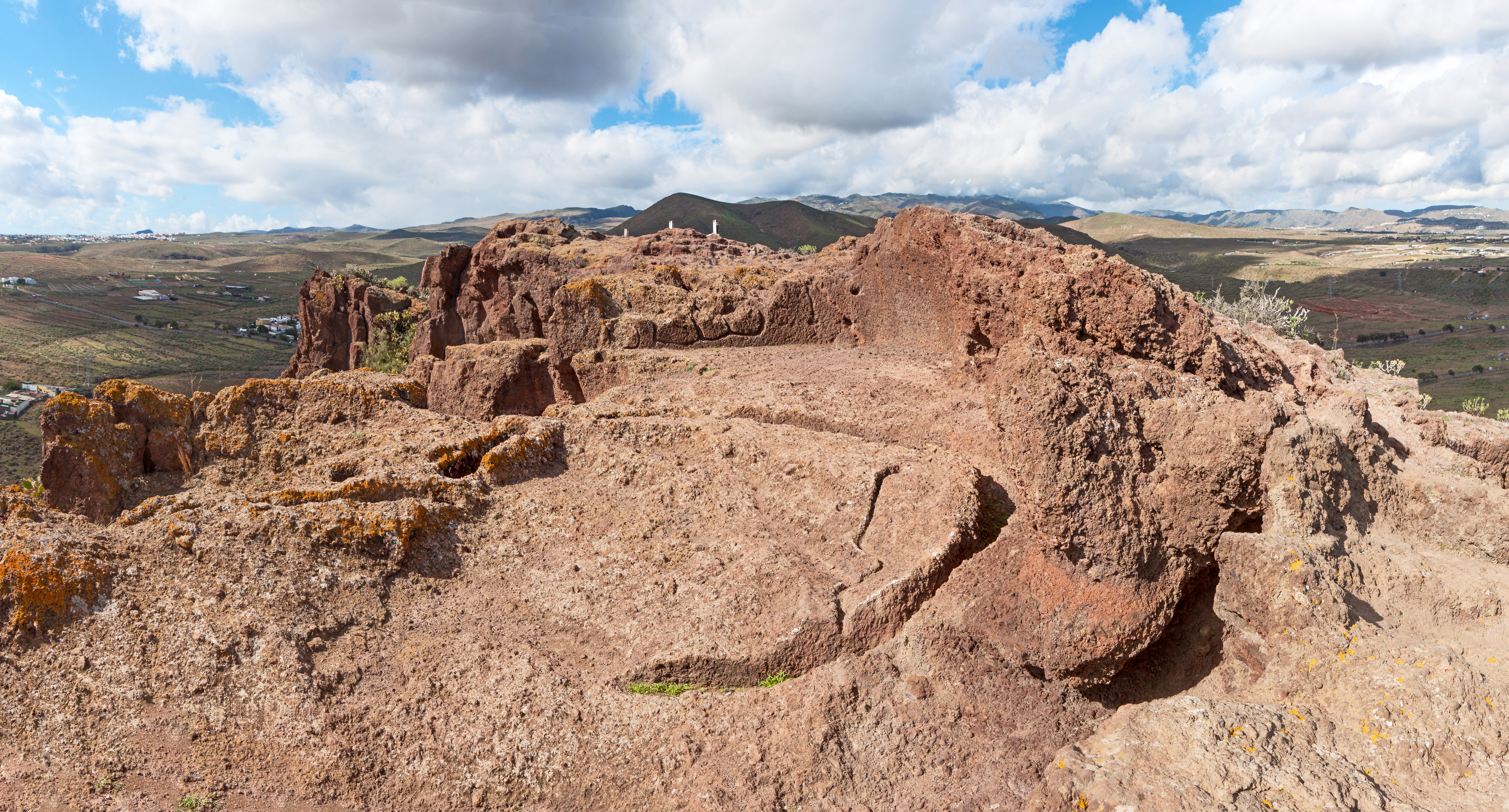
Signs engraved in the tuff at the rituals place

In the upper part of the mountain, above and not far east from the Four Doors cave, is another cave with a sacred site or ritual space (cazoleta or almogarén) where libations and offerings to the gods (such as Alcorac, the Sun) were practised in an enclosed space. Milk was also used in the course of these ceremonies. This is similar to the one found at Bentayga Rock.

=== Papers' cave (Cueva de los Papeles) ===
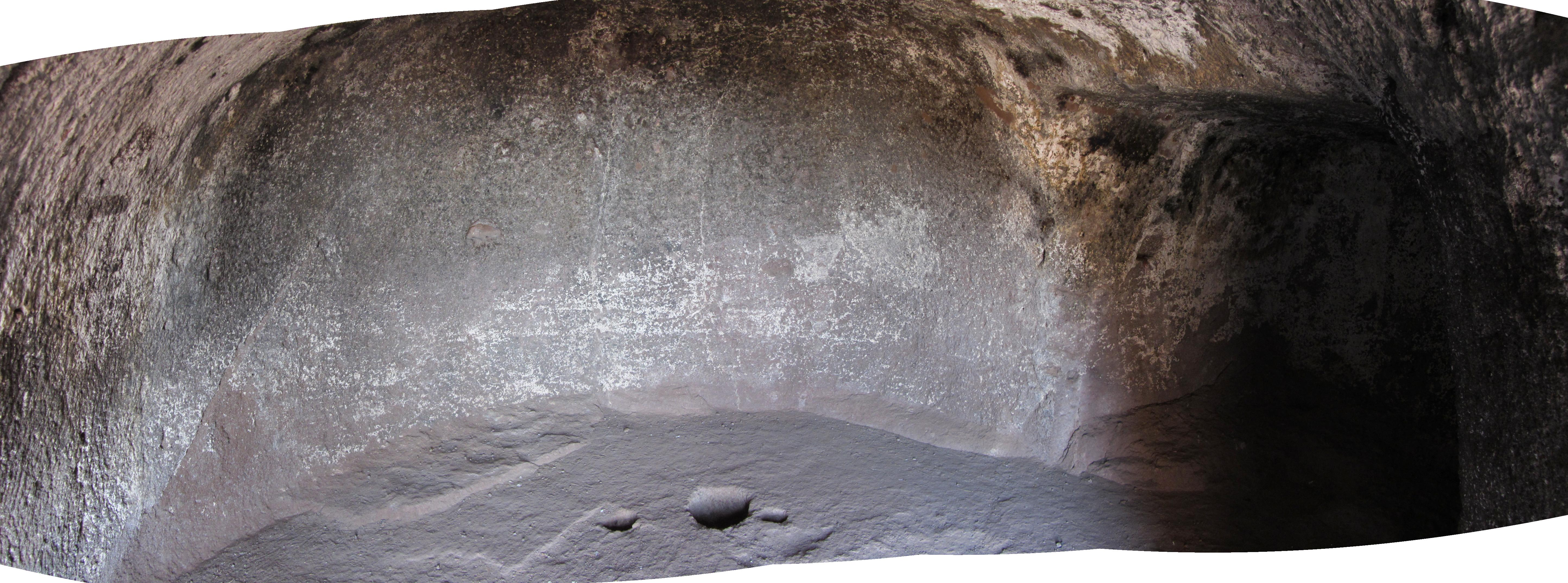
Papers' cave (cueva de los Papeles)

The cueva de los Papeles ("Papers' cave") is in the south part of the mount. It is reached by a path cut in the tuff in the south face of the mount, going east from the ritual place.

Its floor plan is more or less circular. its walls bear various engraved triangles, a sign associated with fertility; this cave was probably used for rituals around that theme.

=== Pillars cave (Cueva de los Pilares) ===
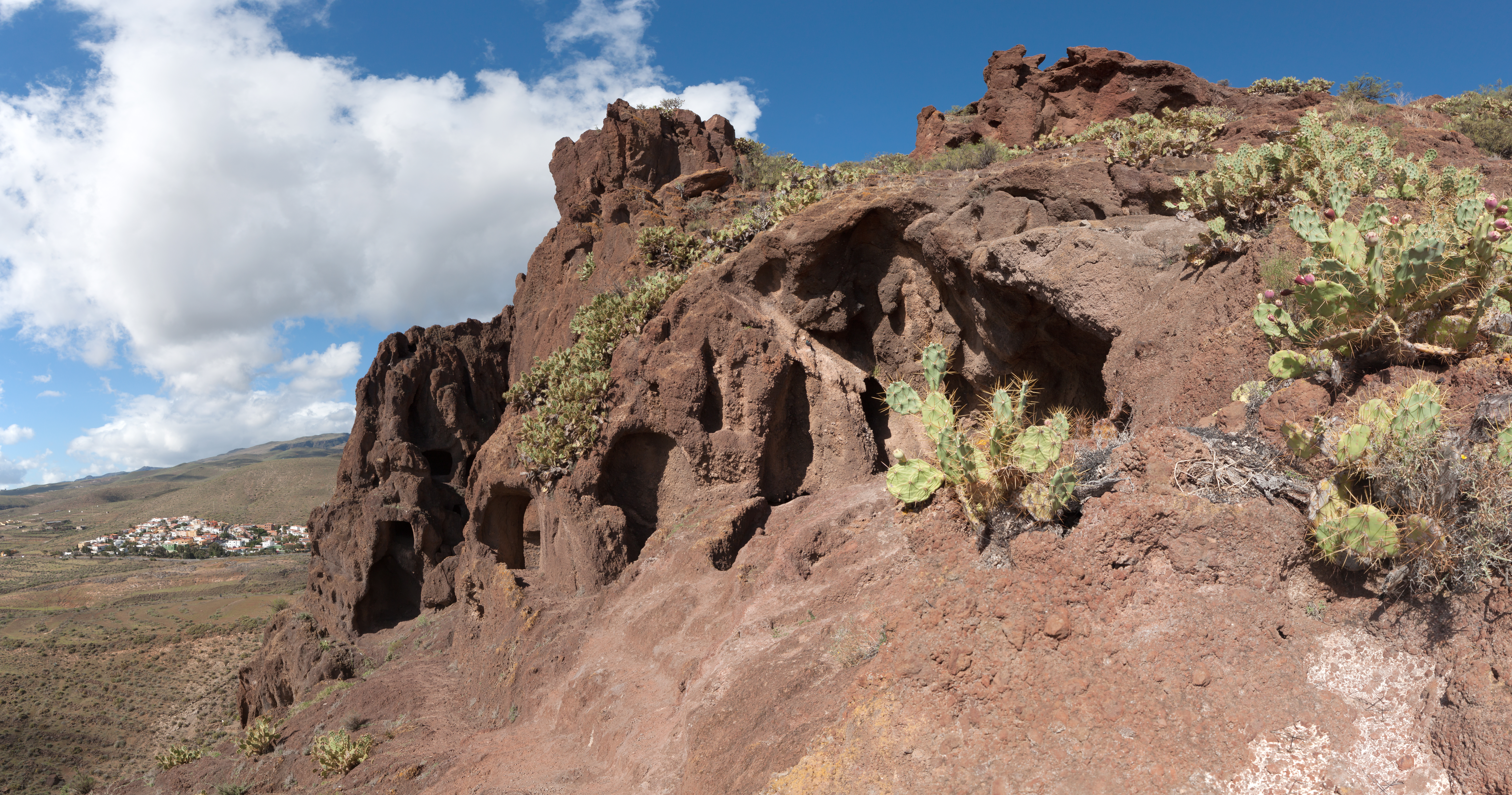
Pilars cave (Cueva de los Pilares)

The same path coming from the ritual place to the Papers' cave leads further to the Pillars cave (Cueva de los Pilares), which is accessed through ramps, stairs and small tunnels.

The Pillars' cave (cueva de los Pilares) site is the heart and main part of the troglodyte village of Montaña Bermeja. It is south-orientated, sheltered from the dominant winds and commands a noticeably wide panorama that includes the coast. It may have been surrounded with a thick dry stone wall. Most of the caves are more or less circular inside, many with lateral rooms. There are depressions in the ground for cooking fires, cavities in the walls that would have been used as storage places, seats, holes for beams or posts and grooves for window frames and door frames that would have been shut off with pelts or vegetal cloths.

It included granaries and other recesses, the use of which is uncertain.

From it, a path going east passes through a rock arch and by a narrow "chimney" towards the Audience cave and, further up on the eastern slope, at an interesting grindstone quarry – but of difficult access as the path, neglected, has disappeared under opuntia.

=== The Audience Cave ===
The cave of the Audience (cueva de la Audiencia) has been used for various functions such as sleeping quarters, kitchens, silos, granary and others. It stands about 200 m away from the Four Doors cave, near a narrow and hard-to-locate "chimney".

=== The Mills' Quarry (cantera de Molinos) ===
==== Generalities on hand-grindstones ====
These mills, made of stone, were essential to and even emblematic of house life in the Canaries. Every day the gofio was served - some roasted flour - and barley was much used for this purpose; other flours were also much used, especially on Gran Canaria island where agriculture dominated the means of subsistence, contrary to the other islands of the archipelago where livestock farming bore the largest part in food production.

The two types of stone used for them were either tuff, or vacuolated or vesicular basalt (basalt with many small holes in it, due to gas bubbles trapped in the cooling lava): both provide a rough surface, appropriate for abrasions and grinding; but tuff was 3 times more used than vesicular basalt, the latter for which there is no clear evidence of production centres on the isl.

The use of tuff rather than basalt had a notable wear-effect on the islanders' dentitions. Tuff is made of consolidation (aggregated and compacted) volcanic ash; it is technically an igneous rock but is more akin to a sedimentary rock because of its relatively loose inner structure; it has not been fired and its matter components have not melted together. Basalt on the other hand is an igneous rock made of cooled lava; its matter has been fired and thus has a much higher structural integrity than tuff. This is true also of vesicular or vacuolated basalt that present many small holes within their matter. Therefore tuff parts, more easily than basalt does, with minute pieces of its own material; these ended up in the flour, and wore out teeth noticeably more than a purer flour would.

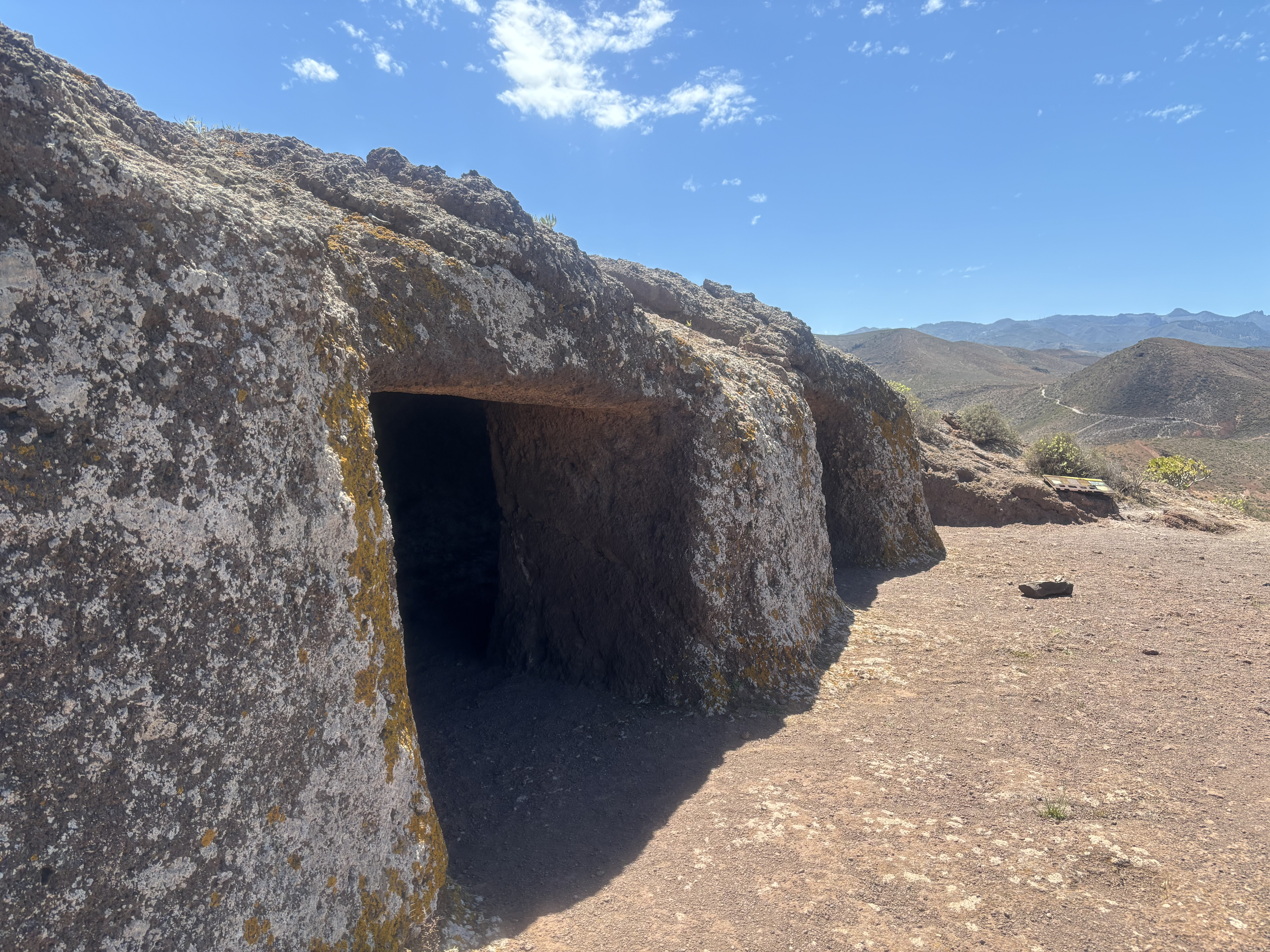
Cuatro Puertas

The grindstones were excavated so that the block of stone was in one piece and more or less already shaped underneath on the outside. Thus each of them left a round or oval hollow, or imprint, on the surface of rock it came from. These "negative imprints" are found all over the surface of the stone quarried, following the relief and remodelling it. Thus their disposition varies with said relief. These traces of extraction are the means by which grindstones quarries are identified.

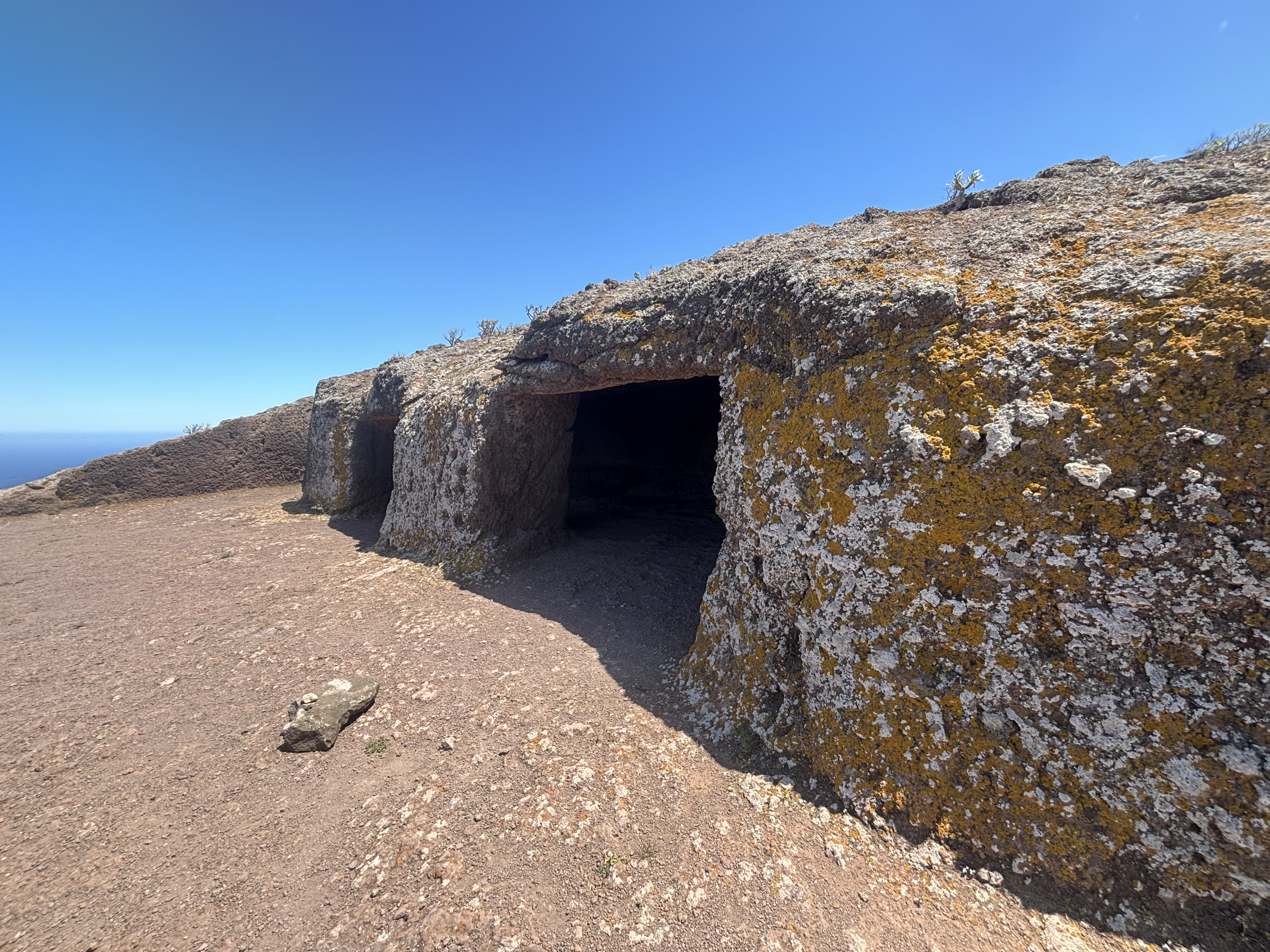
Cuatro Puertas

On Gran Canaria island, seven production sites were identified, in the municipalities of Agaete at La Calera site (La Suerte) and El Risco site (near Cuermeja); in Las Palmas at Los Canarios (El Confital) and Montaña Quemada sites, both on the Isleta, and at La Cardonera site (Riquianez); in Telde at Cuatro Puertas site; and in Santa Lucia de Tirajana at El Queso site (towards Aldea Blanca and Vecindario).

==== Grindstones production in Cuatro Puertas ====
There are two main production sites for hand grindstones in Cuatro Puertas: one dating back to prehistoric times and, immediately next to it on the east side, a more recent historic site. Both are located in the lower portion of the northern slope of Montaña Bermeja, on the path that leads from the village to the cave, further than the Cuatro Puertas cave. Its altitude extends from 197 m to 210 m. It is close to a military zone (escuadrilla logística de Cuatro Puertas).

The site is among a zone of dark-coloured pyroclasts of varying sizes, dating from the Pleistocene era, made of basanite and nephelinite. It is on a steep slope (sloping angle > 45° in some places). The extraction has created a south-orientated shelf with an irregular face, about 20 m wide and 10 to 14 m high. There is one main extraction place, and several other smaller ones scattered nearby on the same slope of the mountain.

This site is in good state of conservation. Its south orientation has preserved it from humidity and from being colonized by lichens (contrary to other sites such as that of Riquiánez for example).

== Conservation issues ==
The site has suffered a notable deterioration due to the natural erosion from wind and water, but also to human actions since up to recently the majority of the caves were used and modified to stable goats and sheep.

In the 1950s this archaeological space was used as cinematographic stage for the filming of the film Tirma, led by Silvana Pampanini. For the filming of one of the scenes a large tuff maquette was realised of the Four Doors cave, generating great deteriorations to the original archaeological space.

The Four Doors cave site is listed in Spanish Heritage as a Site of cultural interest in the category "Archaeological site" since May 25, 1972, by decree nr. 1435/1972. The decree was published in the B.O.E. (Boletín Oficial de España, Spain official journal) nr. 136 on June 7, 1972.

As of 1999, most of the site's land was private property. At that time the government was negotiating to buy it and that of other nearby sites.

It is currently opened to the public as Archaeological Park.

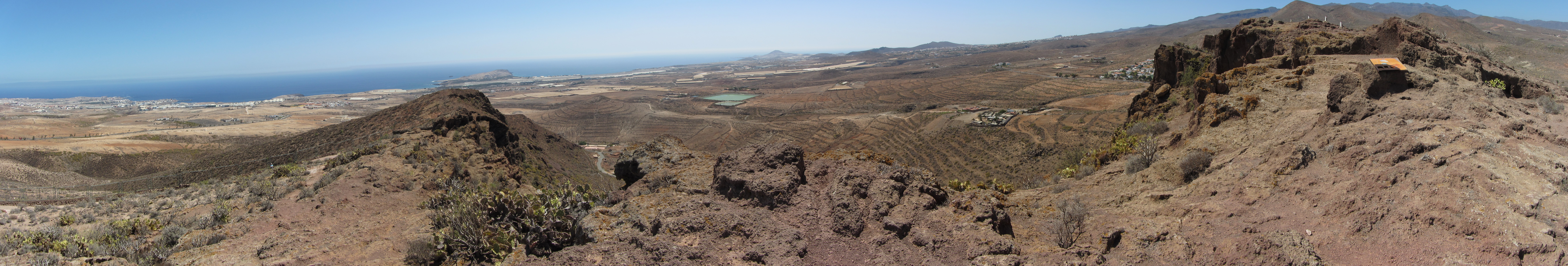
View towards the south-east from the Four Doors site.
On the coast, almost in line with the forefront left peak: the Punta de Gando and Gran Canaria airport just in front of it.

== Other archaeological parks nearby ==
Other nearby archaeological parks open to the public are the caves of Valeron (cenobio de Valeron) in Santa Maria de Guia, the Arteara necropolis in Fataga, the El Maipés necropolis in Agaete, the Cats' ravine (cañada de los Gatos) on Mogán beach near Puerto de Mogan, Bentayga Rock (roque Bentayga) in Tejeda, and the Painted cave (cueva Pintada) museum and archaeological park in Galdar.

== Similar structures ==
Other similar structures on the island are :

- King's caves (cuevas del Rey) and Bentayga Rock (Roque Bentayga) in Tejeda
- Caves of the Granary (cuevas del Pósito) in Temisas, Agüimes
- the Numerous caves (cuevas Muchas) in the Guayadeque ravine (barranco de Guayadeque), Ingenio
- Caves of the Dove (cuevas del Palomar) in Tabuco, Ingenio
- Small Dragon caves (cuevas del Draguillo) in El Gamonal, between Telde and Ingenio
- El Álamo in Acusa, Artenara
- Birbique in Roque Bermejo, Agaete
- the caves of Valeron near Galdar
- the Guayadeque ravine (barranco de Guayadeque) in Aguimes
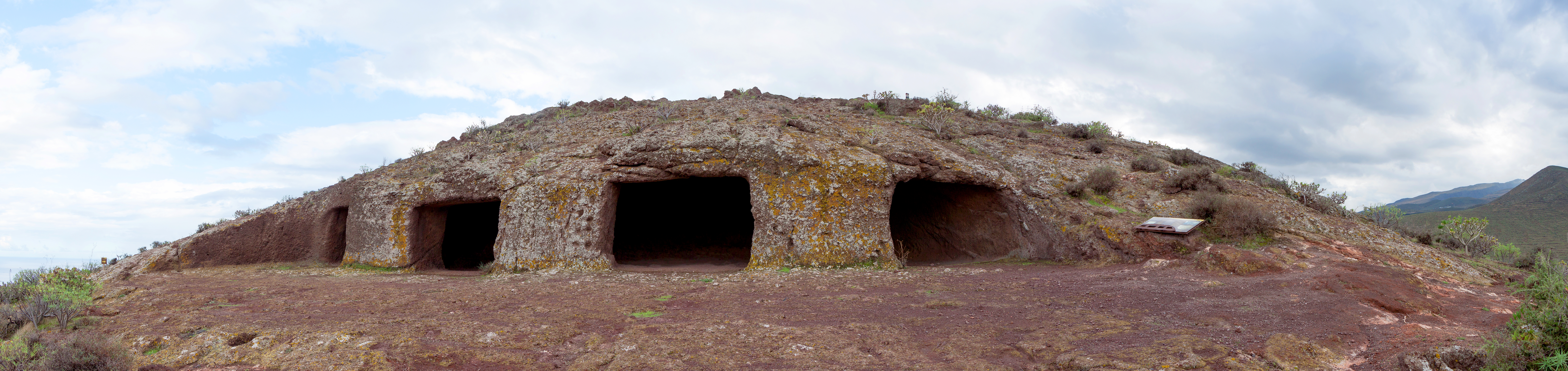

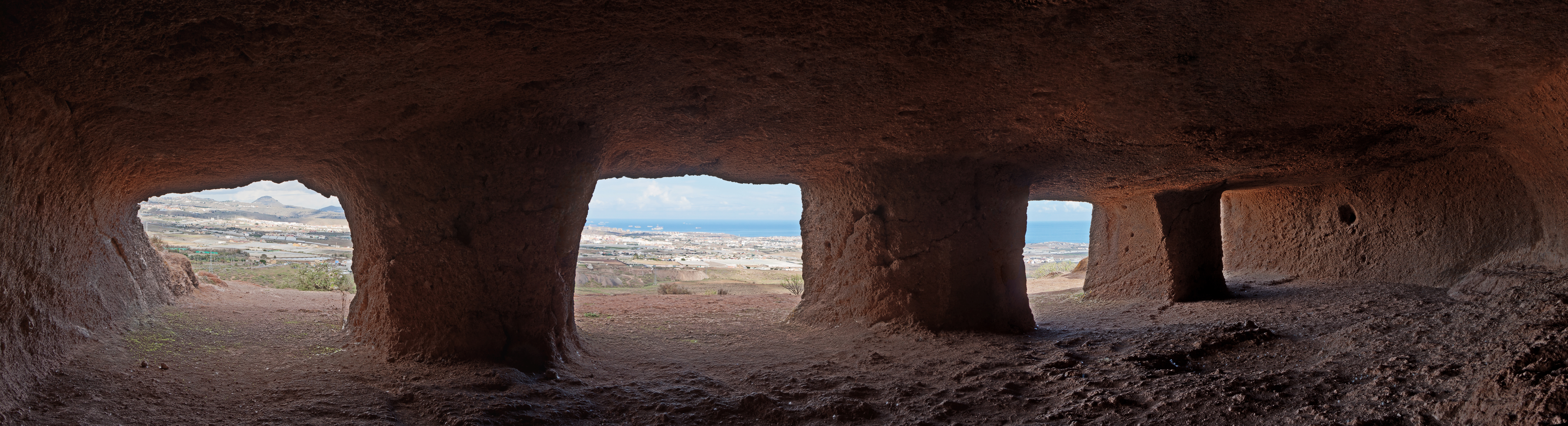

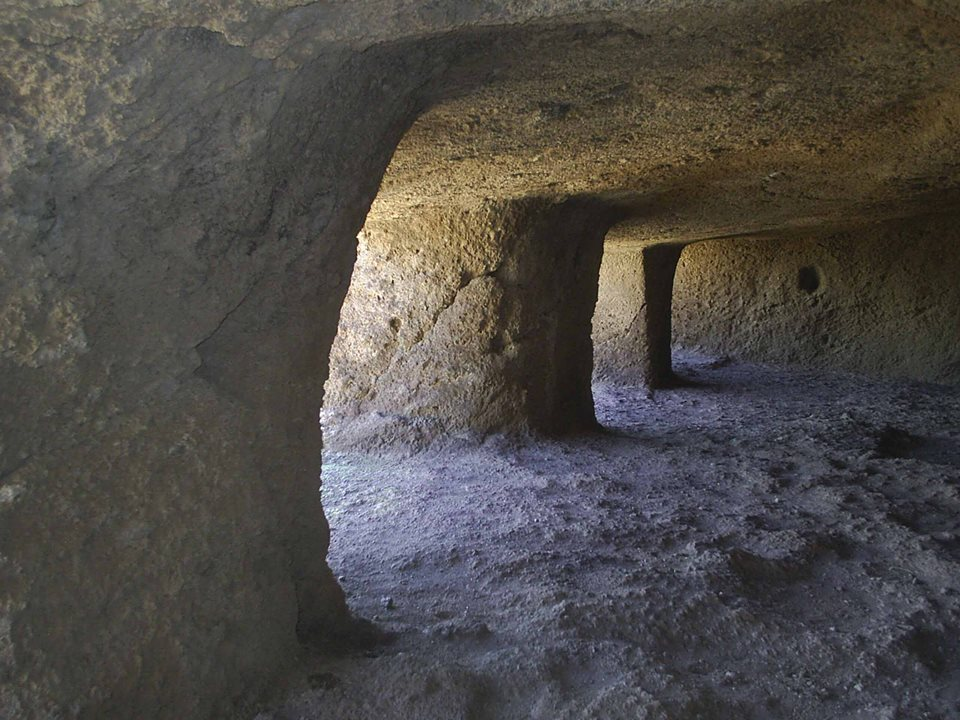

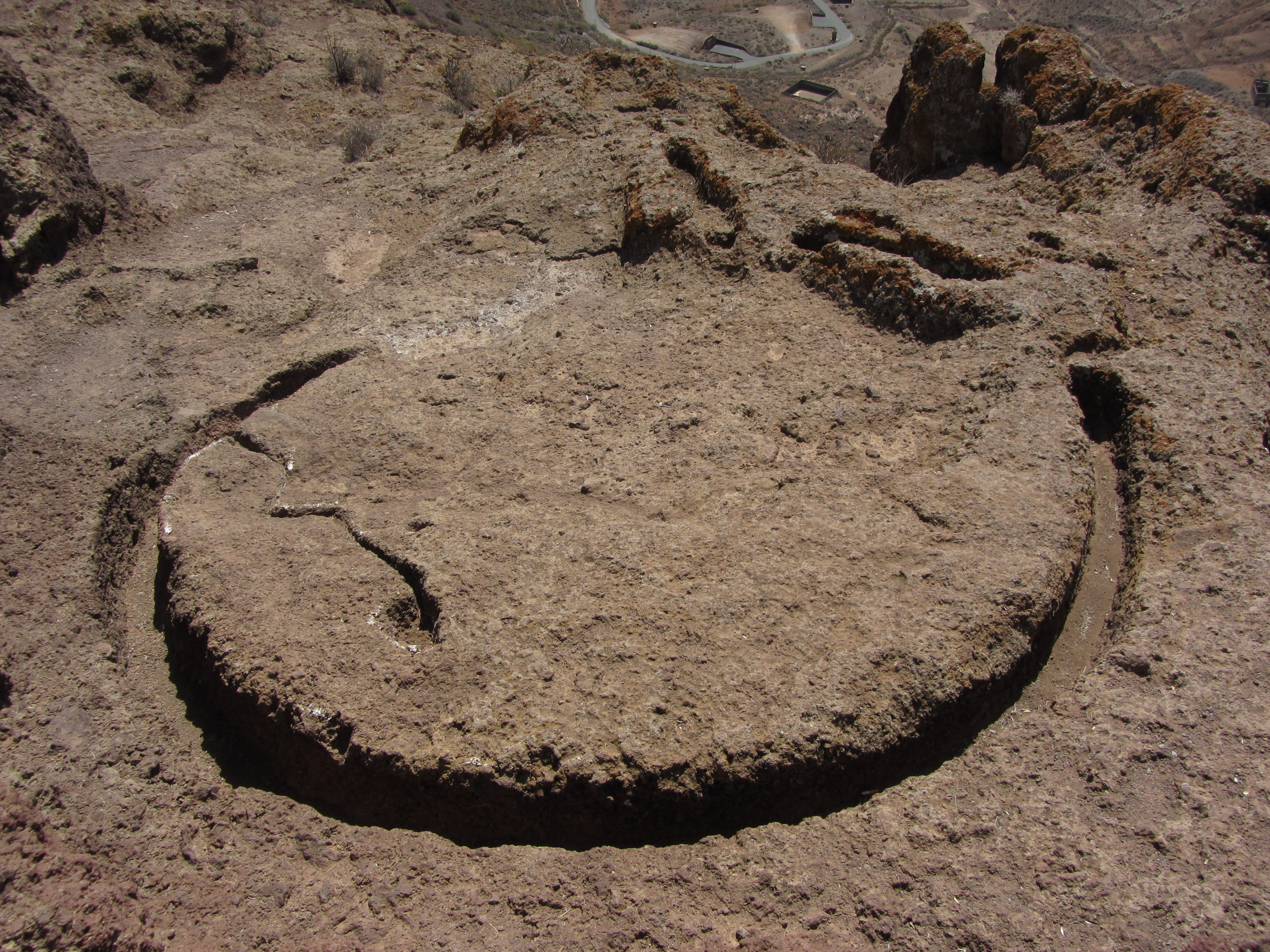
The almogarén

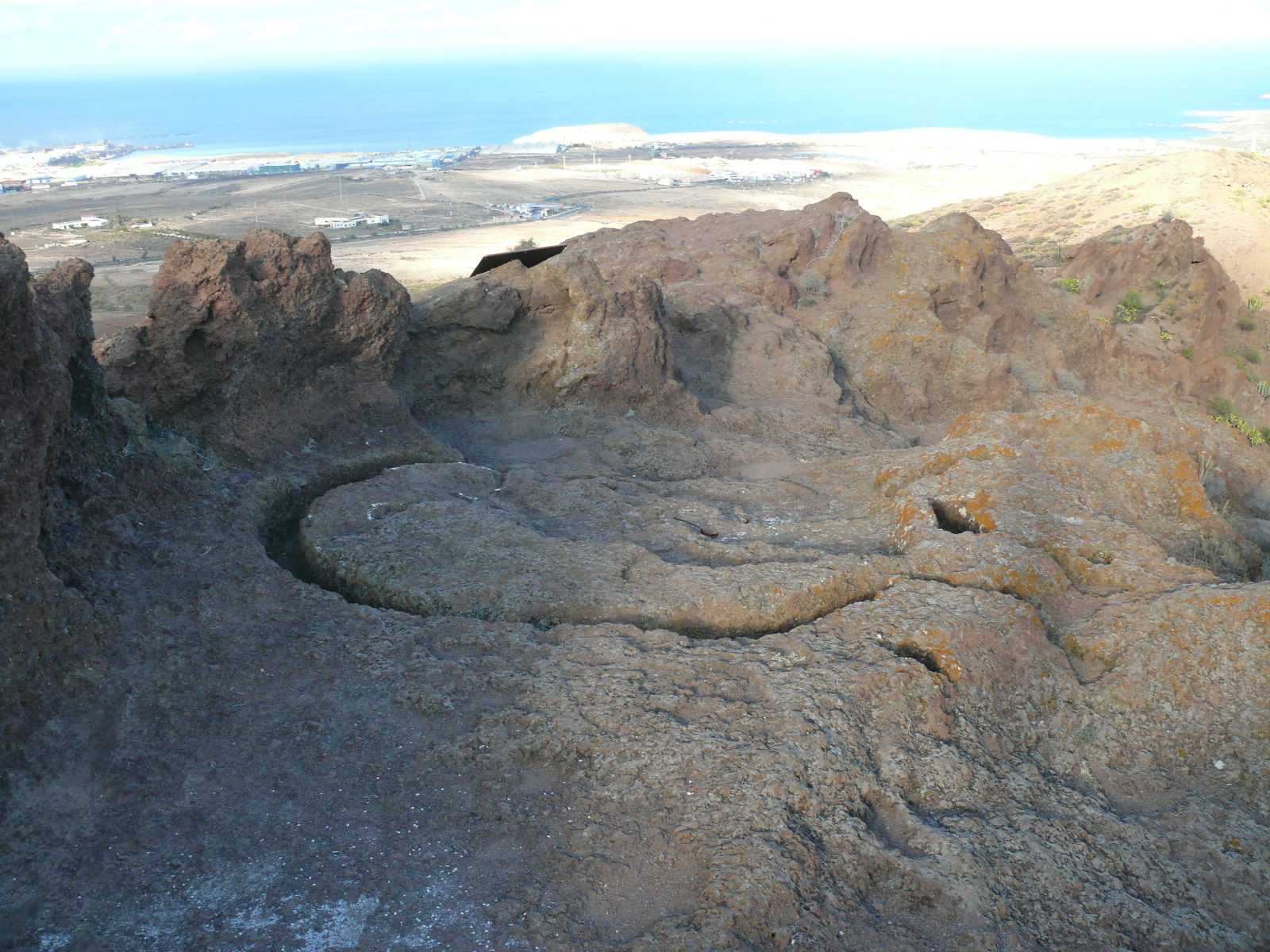
The almogarén

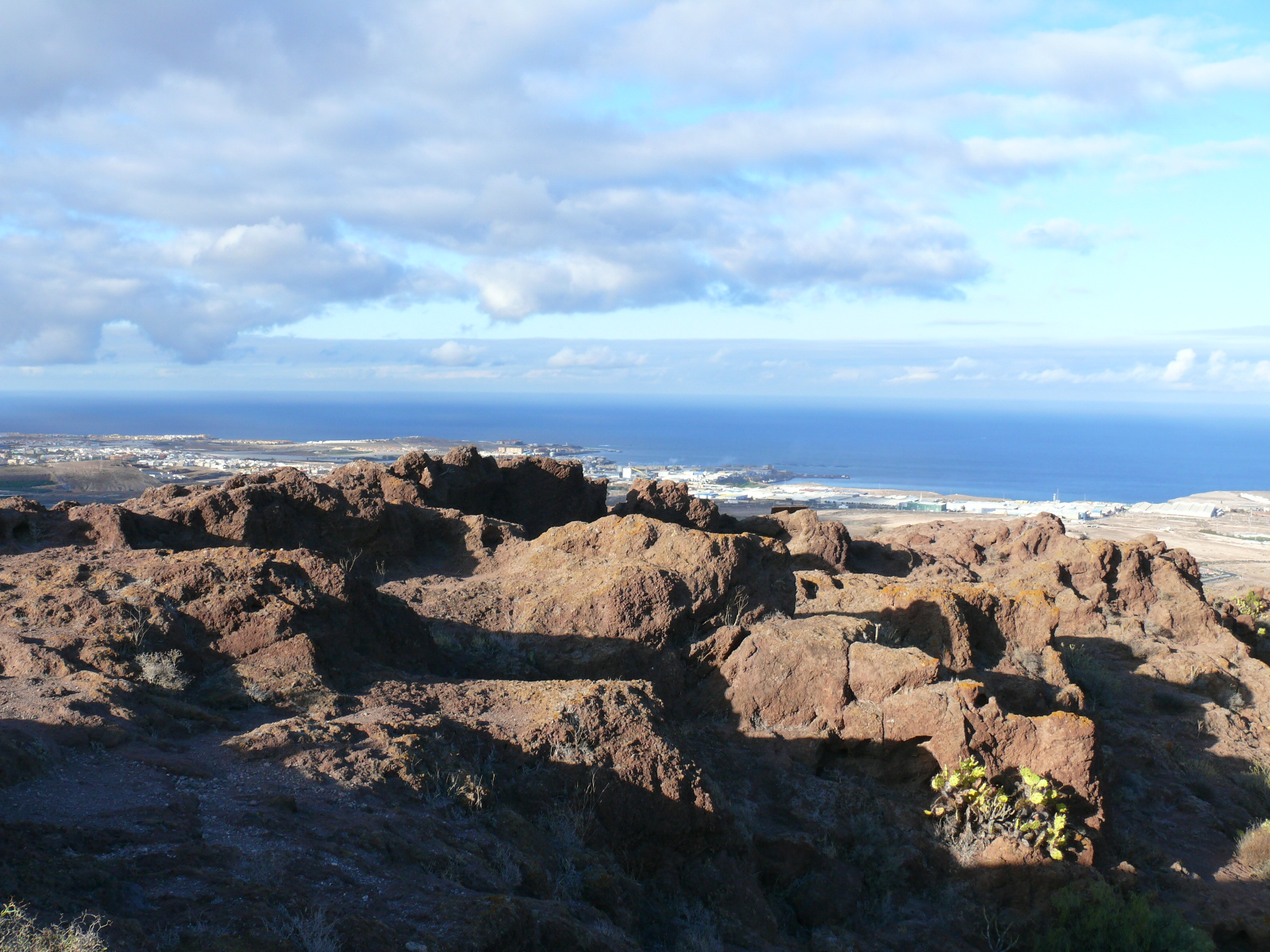
View from the Four Doors site

== See also ==
=== External links ===
- Canarian Archeology on arqueologiacanaria.com.
- List of Archaeological Heritage, Gran Canaria on grancanaria.com, site of the tourism office in Gran Canaria island.
- Cuatro Puertas, conjunto, lugar y montaña de (Telde). Photo of the mountain with the main sites indicated and named.

=== Bibliography ===
- (in Spanish) Mederos Martin, Alfredo; Escribano Cobo, Gabriel (2002). Los aborígenes y la prehistoria de Canarias. Centro de la Cultura Popular Canaria. ISBN 84-7926-382-2.
- (in Spanish) Rodríguez Rodríguez, Amelia; Martín Rodríguez, Ernesto; Mangas Viñuela, José; Francisco Ortega, Isabel (2007). Las canteras de molinos de mano de Gran Canaria. Anatomía de unos centros de producción singulares [The hand-grindstones quarries. Anatomy of a singular production centres] (PDF). Revista Tabona, pp. 115-141. ISBN 978-84-7926-382-9.
- Andrews, Sarah; Quintero, Josephine (2007). Canary Islands. Lonely Planet. ISBN 978-1741045956.
- (in Spanish) Sebastian Jimenez Sanchez. Cuevas y Tagóror de la Montaña de Cuatro Puertas (Isla de Gran Canaria). Report on a visit to the Cuatro Puertas site.
- (in Spanish) Sebastian Jimenez Sanchez. Excavaciones arqueologicas en Gran Canaria, del Plan national de 1942, 1943 y 1944.
