= Caves of Valeron =

Cave and archaeological site on Grand Canary, Spain

- native name: Cenobio de Valerón ("Monastery of Valeron")
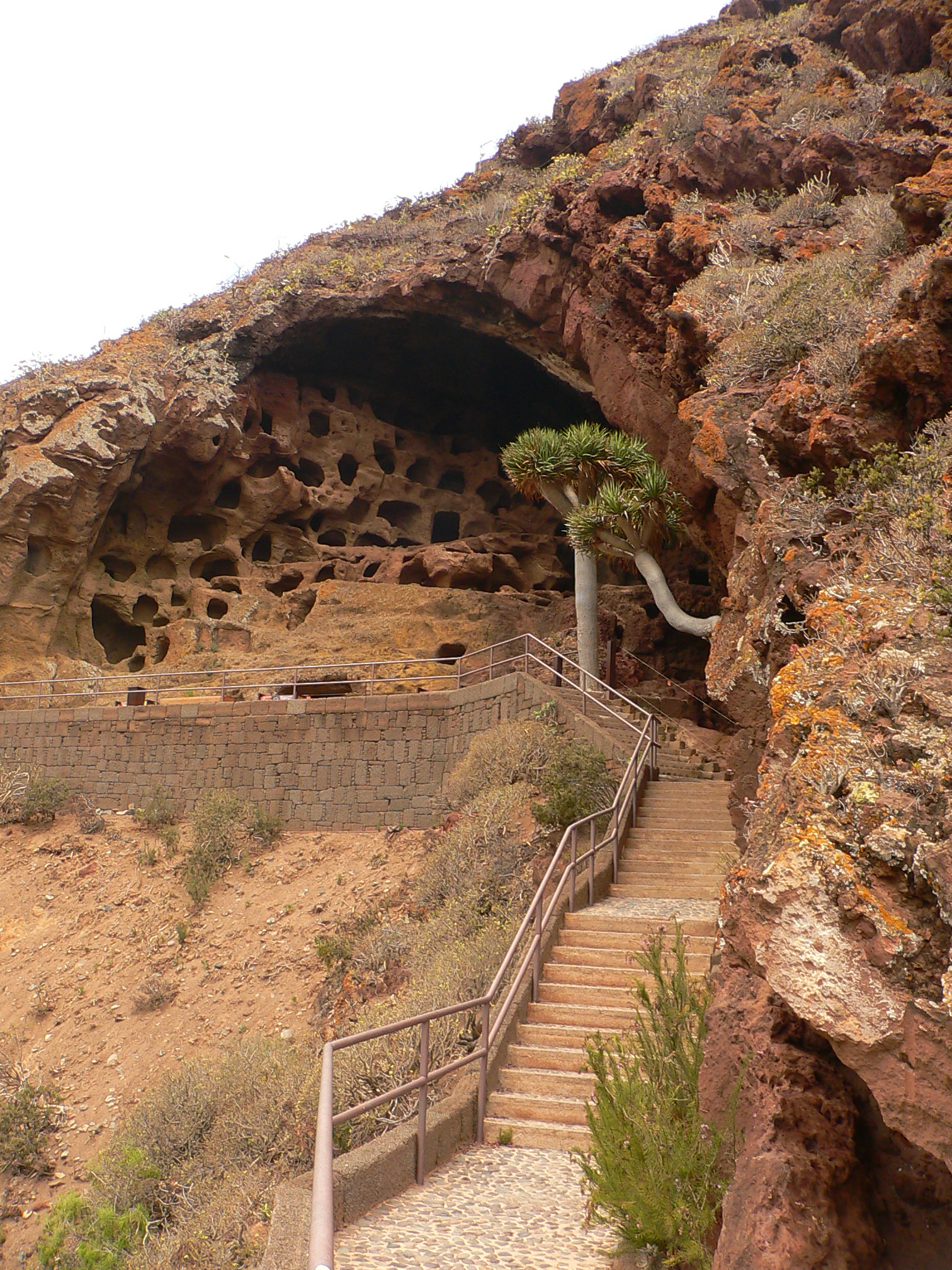
- General view of the caves

- Location of the caves of Valeron on Grand Canary - map of the Canary Islands
- Location: Santa María de Guía municipality, Grand Canary, Canary Islands (Spain)
- Coordinates: 28°8′20.27″N 15°36′15.95″W
- Elevation: 275 m (902 ft)
- Website: (in Spanish) Cenobio de Valeron

Caves of Valeron
- Cenobio de Valerón ("Monastery of Valeron") (Spanish)
- Location of the caves of Valeron on Gran Canary, off the coast of Africa
- 28°8′20.27″N 15°36′15.95″W
- Type: cave
- Nearest city: Gáldar

History
- Original use: Collective granary

Spanish Cultural Heritage
- Official name: Cenobio de Valerón ("Convent of Valeron")

Valerón's "monastery" (in Spanish cenobio de Valerón) is an archaeological site on the Spanish island of Grand Canary, in the municipality of Santa Maria de Guia, on Valerón's cliff. It is the largest pre-Hispanic collective granary built before Roman times and used by the island's inhabitants until the conquest of the island at the end of the 15th century.

Close to Gáldar Painted cave, it is one of the emblematic sites of Grand Canary and is listed as a Spanish Property of cultural interest.

== Location ==
It is located 600 m (1,969 ft) (in direct line) south of the northern coast of the Gran Canaria island, on the small GC-291 road, near Las Palmas (23 km (14 mi) east) and Agaete (11 km (7 mi) south-west) (see § "Access" for more details). Galdar is about 4 km (2 mi) west in direct line. The site overlooks the San Felipe ravine, a north-orientated funnel-shaped valley crossed over by a large bridge for the GC-2 motorway.

The place was chosen for its easy-to-dig tuff, for the fact that it is hidden from the sea and for its extremely steep access slopes that make good natural defences. (Note: The uTube video Cenobio de Valerón caves archaeological site - Gran Canaria shows in details all that can be seen from outside the caves, including from 1'21 to 1'28 a panoramic view of the surroundings as seen from the entrance of the caves complex; the sea is not in sight. The beginning of the video shows the surroundings, its steep slopes and difficult access.)

== Description ==
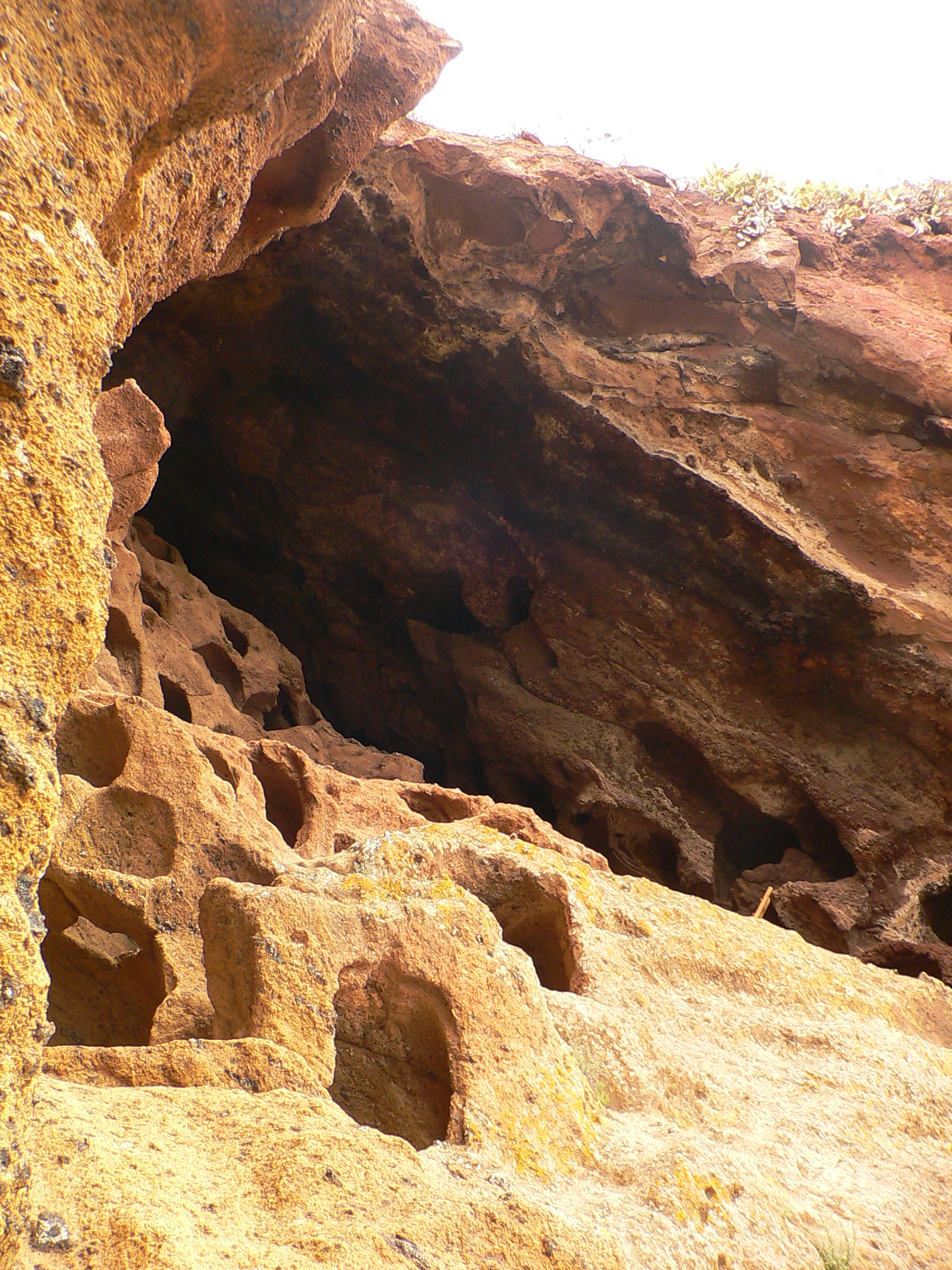
Main entrance

The collective granary known as "cenobio de Valerón" is a complex system of caves on several levels: 298 compartments with surfaces between one and three square meters, distributed on 8 levels. Altogether with silos, rooms, caves and cavities, there are more than 350 storage places. They were excavated with stone and wood tools in the soft tuff - cemented volcanic tephra - in the north-west face of the mountain known nowadays as Mountain of the Galician ("Montaña del Gallego"). The easy defence of the site, the natural shelter offered by a natural arch in the mountain and the conditions of temperature and dampness were making it ideal for its use.

The caves or silos are of varied forms and sizes, communicating somewhat with each other, and they are grouped on several superposed levels. The steps excavated in the rock still exist and they may have been complemented with stairs or scaffoldings and ropes, of which there are no archaeological remains.

The caves were shut with doors made of unknown material, which left traces. These are believed to have been made of wood, stone slabs or soft materials like textile or leather. A few stone slabs have remained and it seems that when wooden doors were used they received a seal (pintadera) to indicate the owner. Their holes, as well as other grooves, were sealed in addition by an ashen mortar. All this aimed at preserving the crops.

Within the site are found idols, paintings, ceramics, human bones and ashes, which are believed to have belonged to those who were guarding the granary.

Accounts dating from the Spanish conquest mention towers framing the caves.

The sheer size of the caves complex is witness to the importance of agriculture on Gran Canary, for subsistence but also for the society's socio-political structure; and of the power of its governing casts. Alone on that among the Canary islands that all favoured stock-breeding, Gran Canary's agriculture was dominated by plantations, with much of these being grains.

== Origin of the name ==
The name of "monastery" comes from the Roman belief that herein had lived some celibate priestesses called "harimaguadas", with whom young women of noble class came to live until their marriage (this society was matrilineal). The above-mentioned vision prevailed up to the 20th century, when Guy Marcy, a French archaeologist, was the first to recognize its real use as being obviously similar to that of other structures of the island and of north Africa. In addition, some of the chronicles mention the practice of preserving the food in crags of difficult access. The North African granaries or agadirs often have a common storage area, guarded by the community to which it belongs, with chambers used and maintained by individuals.

== Similar structures ==
Other similar granary structures on the island are :

- King's caves (cuevas del Rey) and Bentayga Rock (Sp. Roque Bentayga) in Tejeda
- Caves of the Granary (cuevas del Pósito) near Temisas, Agüimes
- El Álamo site near Acusa, Artenara
- the Numerous caves (Sp. cuevas Muchas) in the Guayadeque ravine (Sp. barranco de Guayadeque), Ingenio
- Anzofé site near Galdar
- La Montañeta near Moya
- Caves of the Dove (cuevas del Palomar) near Tabuco, Ingenio
- La Isleta near Las Palmas
- Barranco de Silva near Telde
- Small Dragon caves (cuevas del Draguillo) in El Gamonal (Telde), between Telde and Ingenio
- Los Pilares cave in the Four Doors cave site, Telde complex near Telde
- Tara site in Telde
- Temisas in Aguimes
- Rosiana site in San Bartolomé de Tirajana
- Cueva de la Audiencia (Note: The cave of the Audience (cueva de la Audiencia), in the Four Doors cave site complex near Telde, is a cave settlement hewn out of the rock by hand and has been used for various functions such as sleeping quarters, kitchens, silos, granary and others.) in the Four Doors cave site on Bermeja mountain, Telde
- Birbique in Roque Bermejo, Agaete

All are located in the north-west, north and north-east of the island. Although a few caves were dug in isolated locations, most of them are near the sea coast and are concentrated, often in large groups. The largest structures are near the two towns that were the main population centres in pre-Hispanic times: Telde and Galdar.

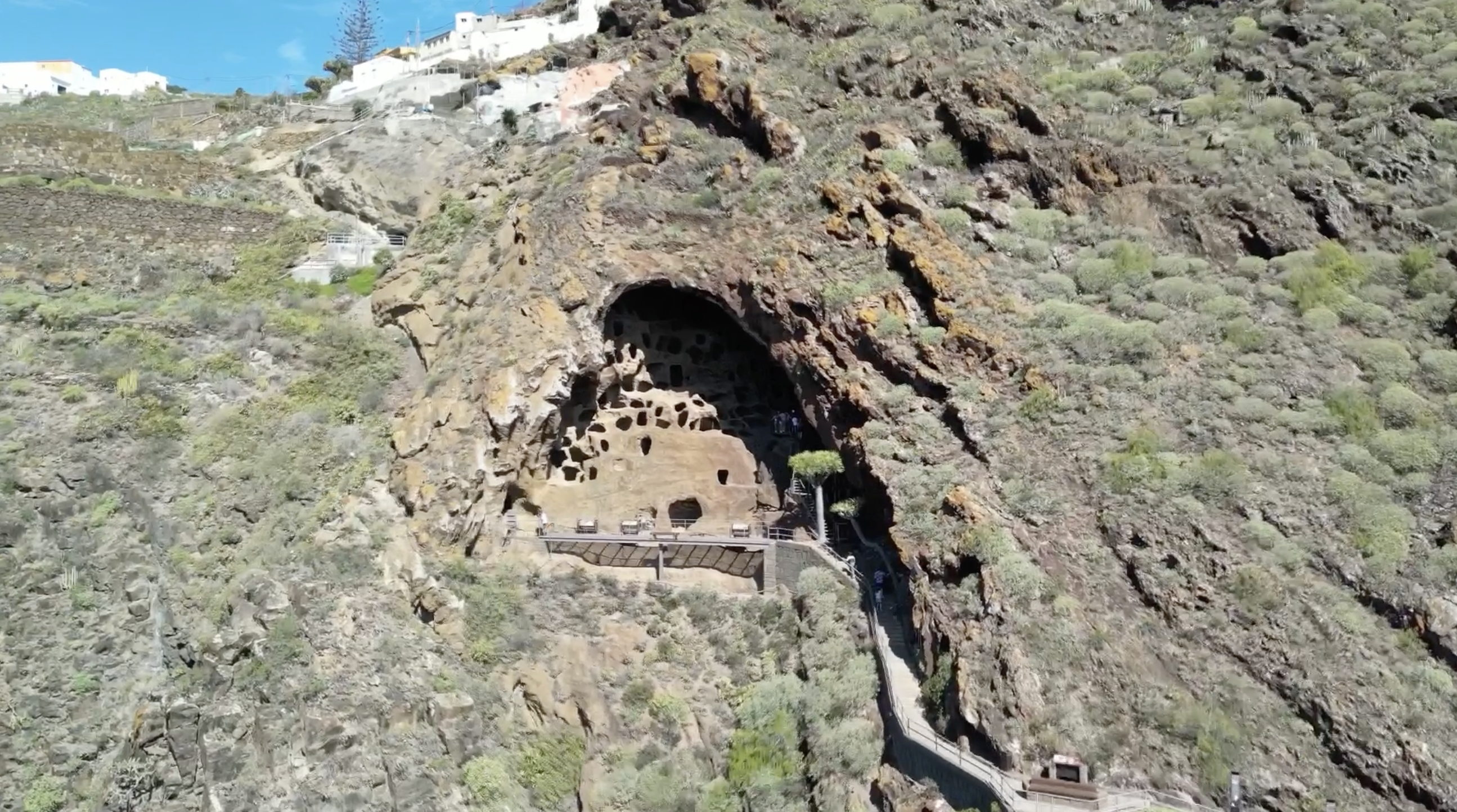

Some of the main artificial cave sites of the island are located in the relative vicinity of the Painted cave (cuevas del Hospital, Huertas del Rey or the Audience cave at the Four Doors cave site).

== Protection ==
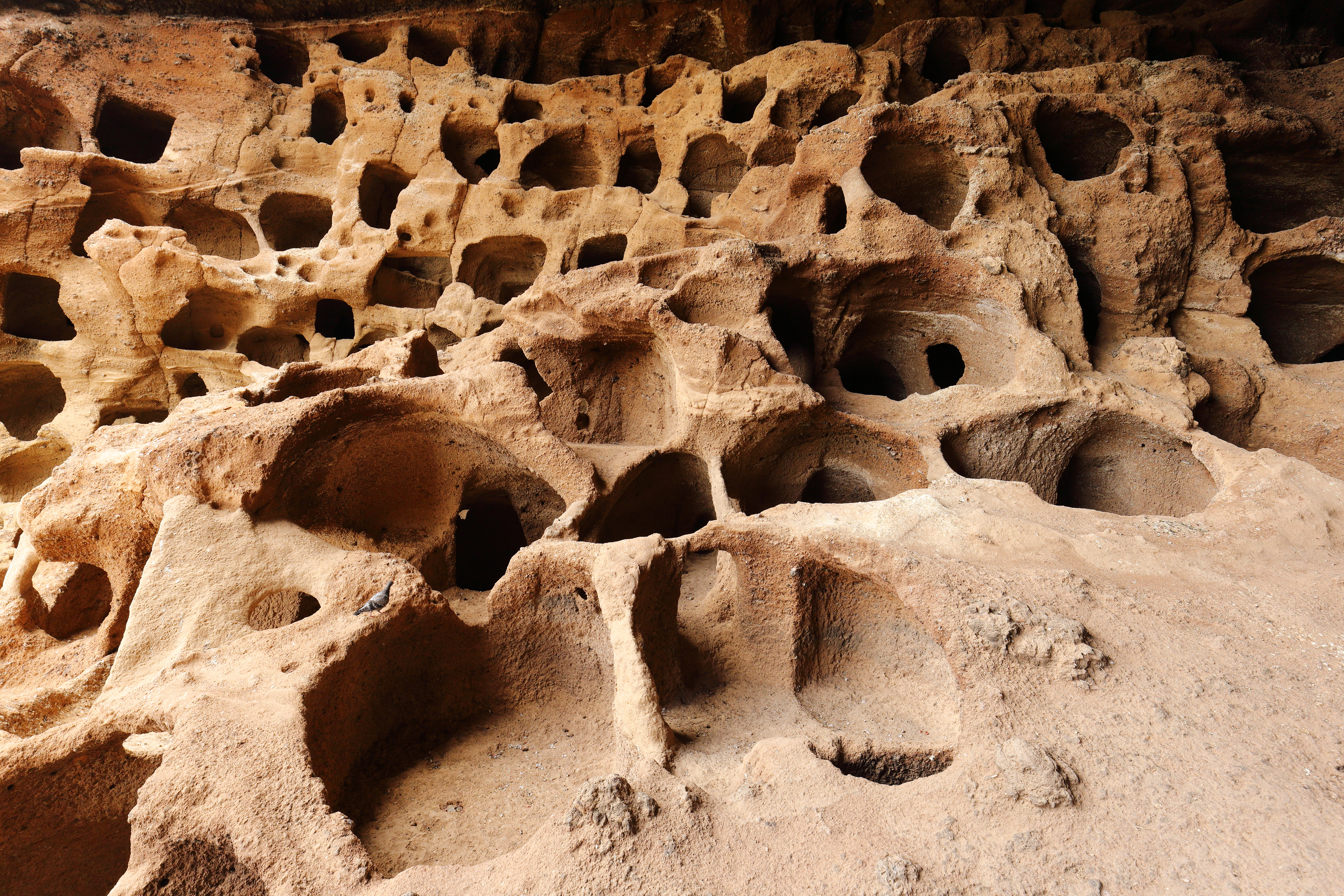

Valerón's Monastery was declared Historical Artistic Monument on October 14, 1978, by royal decree 2.756/78. Due to the current law, 16/85 of June 25, 1985 on Historical Spanish Heritage, it became a Property of cultural interest in the category of "Archaeological site". The site belongs to the Santa María de Guía's municipality, being inscribed in the Municipal Inventory of Built Properties, and in the Land registry of Property of urban nature.

In 2010 was undertaken a large restoration program that included the rehabilitation of the historic San Felipe footpath used of old by the locals to access the caves. The site was shut for 2 years.

Nowadays the site is open to the public as archaeological park, and is included in the Network of archaeological parks of Grand Canary. The latter also includes the archaeological sets of Arteara necrópolis in Fataga, the necropolis in Agaete, the Cañada de Los Gatos by Mogán's beach, Bentayga Rock (Roque Bentayga) in Tejeda, the Guayadeque ravine (barranco de Guayadeque) in Ingenio near Agüimes, the Painted cave (cueva Pintada) in Galdar, and the Four Doors cave site (Cuatro Puertas) in Telde.

== Access ==
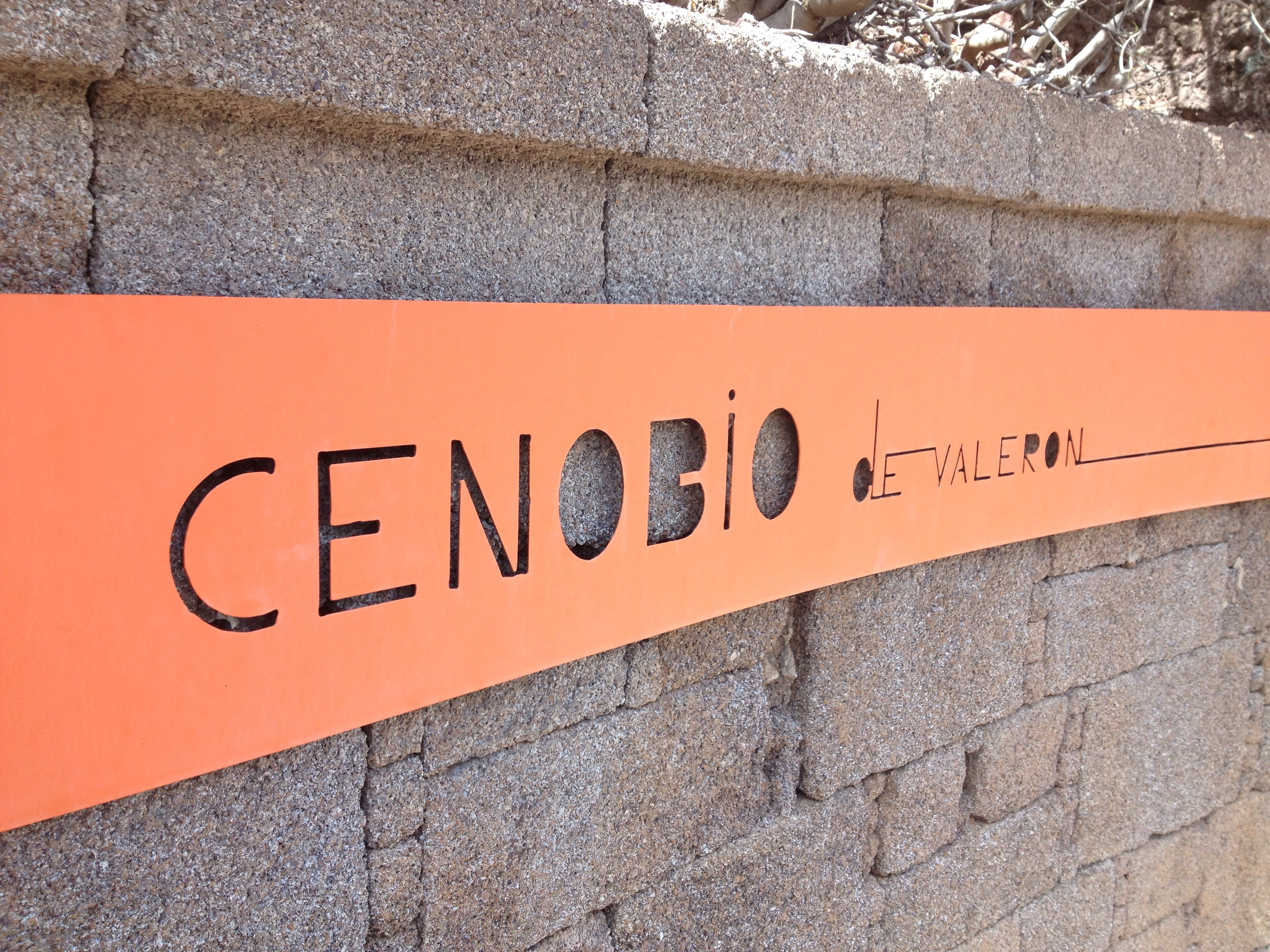

The main access to the GC-291 road is immediately east of Albercon de la Virgen, from exit 20 on the 2 x 2 lanes "carretera Variante de Silva" GC-2 highway that goes from Agaete (11 km north-east) and Las Palmas (23 km west); or indirectly from exit 21 (Llano Parra, GC-292, GC-70, Guia, Artenara) of the same GC-2 highway. At exit n° 20 on both directions are indicated the Felix Santiago Meliàn factory, the GC-291 and the cenobio de Valeron - the latter being about 4 km from exit 20.
The other end of the GC-291 road (eastward) joins again the GC-2 road near San Felipe in the direction of Las Palmas (not that of Agaete), but the traffic cannot exit the GC-2 either way.

The site is open for visits all year round from Tuesday to Sunday, except for a few special days (Boxing day, Xmas, New year,...). The caves themselves are off-limits for reasons of security and preservation, and the site is fenced in and shut at night.

Since the recent rehabilitation works, the site now offers a discovery circuit with information panels along the path, maquettes and other media for visitors.

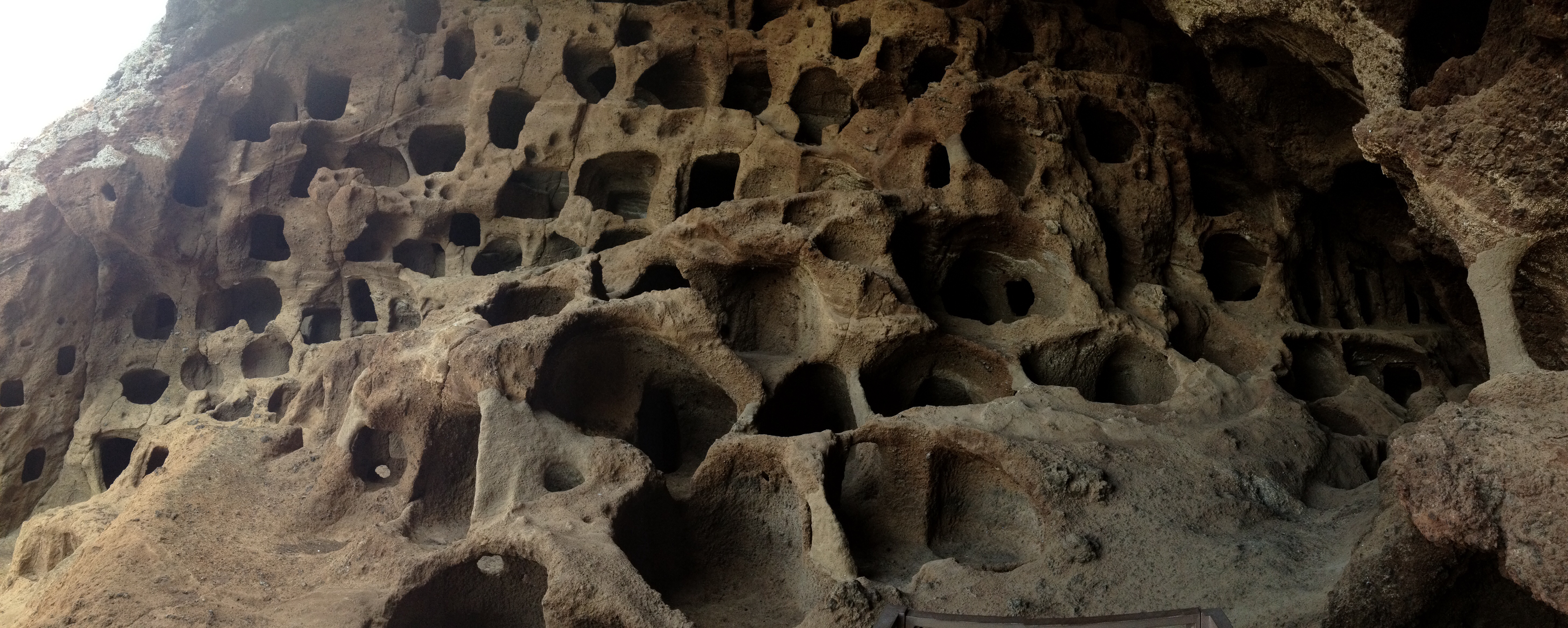

== See also ==
=== Connected articles ===
- Painted Cave, Galdar

=== Bibliography ===
- Mederos Martin, Alfredo; Escribano Cobo, Gabriel (2002). Los aborígenes y la prehistoria de Canarias. Centro de la Cultura Popular Canaria. ISBN 84-7926-382-2.

=== External links ===
- Official website of Valerón caves
- List of archaeological Heritage sites, Grand Canary
- Cenobio de Valerón caves archaeological site - Gran Canaria. Video detailing the views from outside the caves.
