= Valeron =

Valeron or Valerón may refer to:

- Caves of Valerón, caves in Gran Canary
- Hortensia Valerón, Cuban vocalist (soprano)
- Irene Valerón, Spanish model
- Juan Carlos Valerón, Spanish footballer
- Muhammad Valeron, Indonesian footballer
- Skylark of Valeron, science fiction novel
- Valéron Strength Films, a polyethylene film manufacturer
- Valeron, a brand name of paracetamol
