= Guayadeque ravine =

- IUCN category III (natural monument or feature)
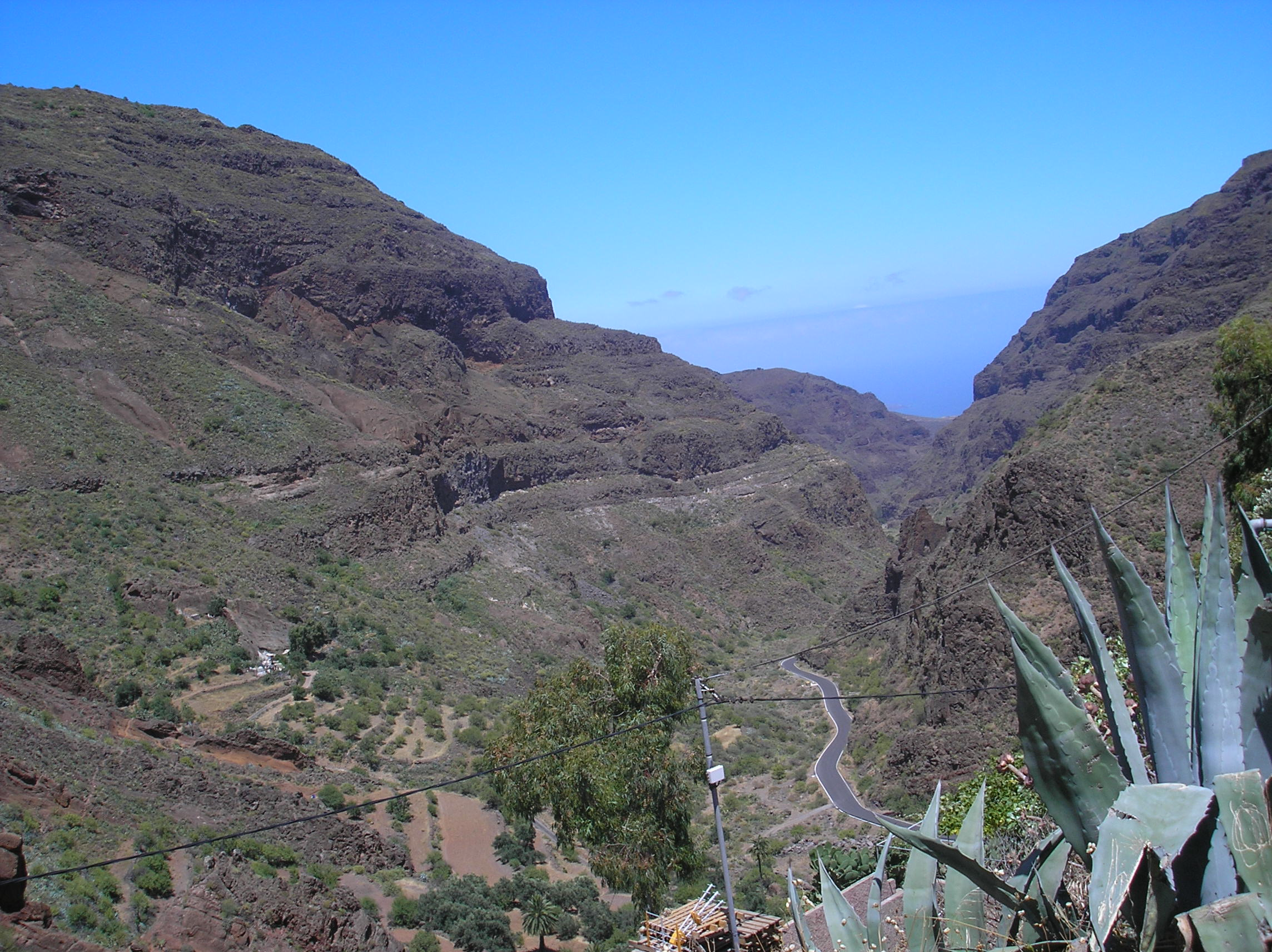
- The valley, view towards the S-E and the sea

- Location within Canary Islands
- Location: Ingenio and Agüimes, Las Palmas, Grand Canary island, Canary Islands, Spain
- Coordinates: 27°56′16″N 15°30′37″W
- Length: 11 km (6.8 mi)
- Area: 7.255 km^{2} (2.801 sq mi)

The Guayadeque ravine, in Spanish Barranco de Guayadeque, is a ravine-type valley located on the Spanish municipalities of Ingenio and Agüimes, in the province of Las Palmas on Grand Canary island.

One of the largest ravines on the archipelago, it is notable for its archaeological remains and for its valuable endemic species of flora and fauna – the latter including one of the largest lizard species. It is also notable for the large quantity of cave houses, including a hermitage and various restaurants dug into the rock.

== Description ==
Located in the south-eastern quarter of Gran Canaria island, the valley starts at the Las Marteles crater (at around 1,500 m (4,921 ft) altitude) and follows a N-W/S-E direction. It separates the two Spanish municipalities of Ingenio and Agüimes, with Agüimes on the south side.

The GC-103 road follows the bottom of the valley and the course of the Guayadeque stream, ending at Montaña de las Tierras where are cave-restaurants and cave-homes. On the way the road crosses Bermeja cave, a small settlement 4 km (2 mi) up the road from the visitors centre. Beyond Montaña de las Tierras is a footpath that goes up to the Las Marteles crater and then joins with the GC-130 road.

The valley's sides present over 300 m (984 ft) and sometimes 400 m (1,312 ft) difference of altitude. Terraced areas for plantations are characteristic of the valley, where fig trees and almond trees are common.

The area's relief was created by volcanic activity and by erosion. The soil substrate is made of basaltic rocks.

== Etymology ==
Guayadeque, according to Ignacio Reyes, means "tranquil spirit" or "reserve of tranquillity" in pre-Hispanic local language.

== Archaeological remains ==
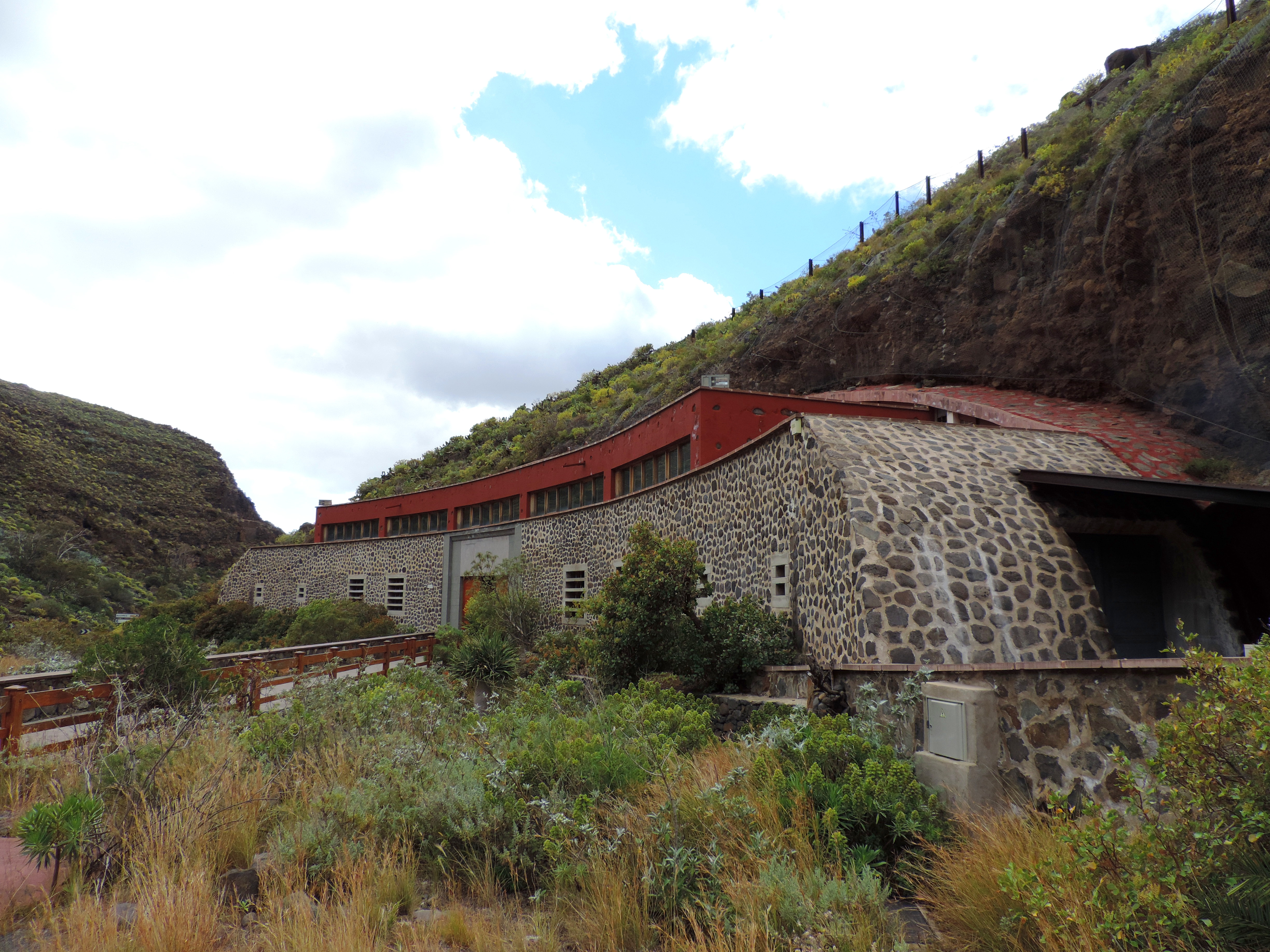
Guayadeque museum

The site used to be the most populated valley on the island and contains hundreds of caves. All the people who lived there have left many mummies and other burial remains in some caves, well guarded by the difficulty of access of the caves they were left in. These caves include Labour cave ("Cueva Labra"), Numerous caves ("Cuevas Muchas"), Canary Cliff ("Risco del Canario"), Vincent Cliff ("Risco Vincentico"), Black Cliff ("Risco del Negro"), etc... The ravine is thus among the most important pre-historic burial ground of the island.

The caves were then used as dwellings, food storage and for fertility rituals. Sometimes burial caves were re-used, in which cases special care was taken to protect the skulls with stones (Note: In Montaña de la Mina (San Bartolomé, Lanzarote), skulls protected with stones were found in the same circumstances as in Guayadeque valley.) and, in Guayadeque, covered with animal skins or covers weaved of reeds.

The 19th century saw much devastation from grave plundering; many items found on the site found their way to the Canarian museum of Las Palmas, who bought them. Subsequently, the site was designated as a nature reserve to stop the plundering and other damages.

The importance of water courses through the valley is shown by the many remains of water mills.

A museum has been built at the beginning of the GC-103 road: the Guayadeque museum – Centre of Archaeological interpretation (Sp.: Museo de Guayadeque – Centro de Interpretación Arqueológica). It shelters an exhibition on human activities in the valley, going back to pre-Hispanic times.

== Nature ==
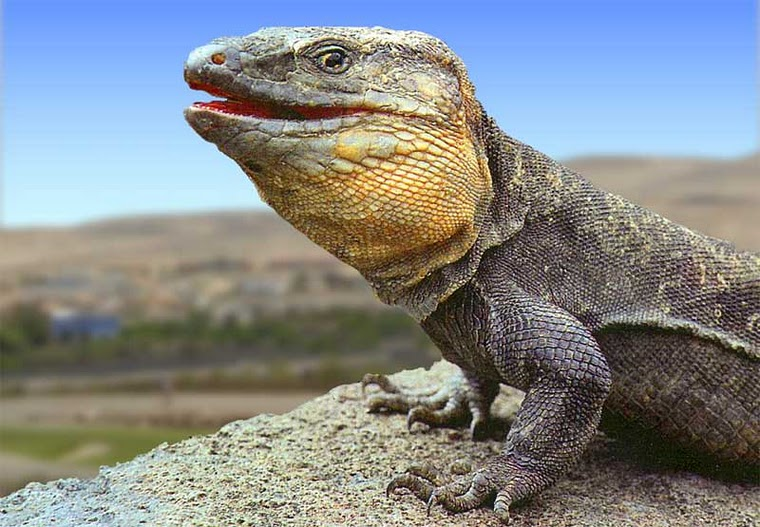
Gallotia stehlini

The ravine is home to more than 80 endemic species, notably the Gallotia stehlini (Sp. Lagarto Canarión), the largest species of lizards in Europe and Africa that can reach 80 cm (31 in) in length.

The vegetation include elements of thermophile woodland and uncommon vegetal species, both meeting on the steep slopes. Such are for example Kunkeliella canariensis (Note: Escobilla and Escobilla de Guayadeque, p. 50 on grancanaria.com. Escobilla is the Spanish common name of Kunkeliella canariensis, a plant endemic to the Guayadeque valley and present only there.) (in Sp. escobilla de Guayedeque), a plant of the sandalwood family, Helianthemum tholiforme, Polycarpaea filifolia (Sp. pataconejo fina) and many other plants endemic to the island.

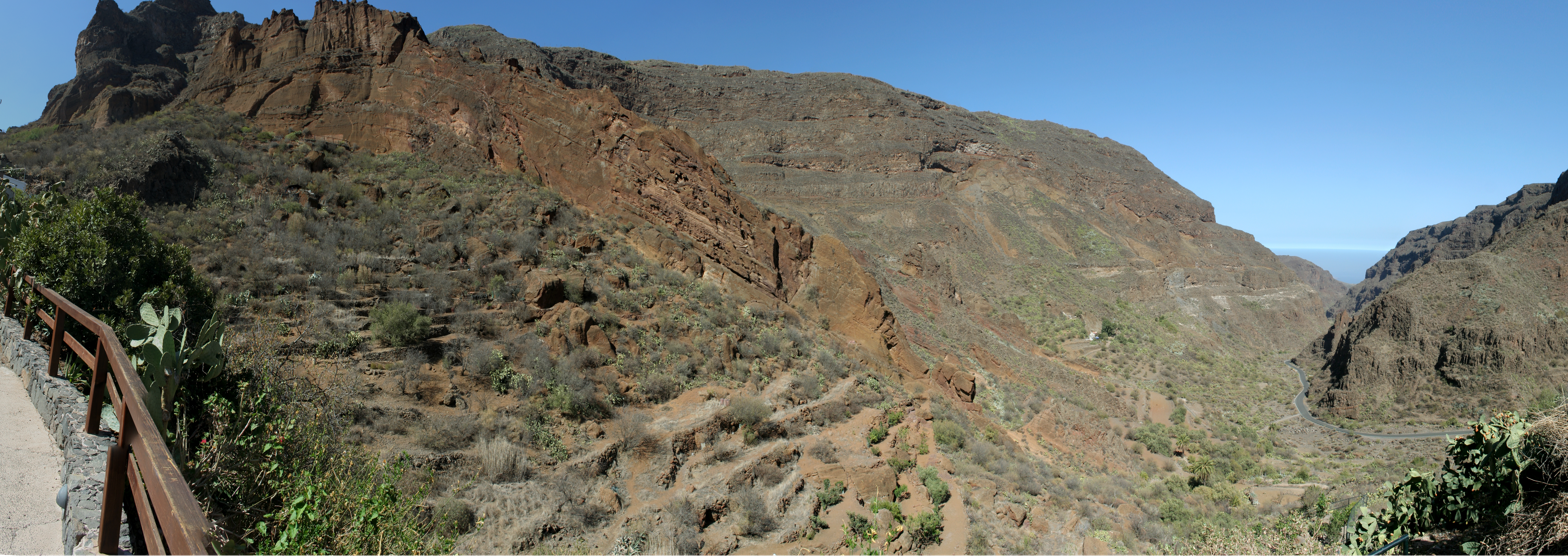
Panoramic view of the valley towards the S-E

== Demographics ==
The population of Guayadeque valley is reduced, but clusters remain. One cluster is Cueva Bermeja ("Red Cave"), a small hamlet that owes its name to the colour of the stone. The other is "Las Tierras Mountains", the site of Los Marteles, site of the Saint John-the-Baptist hermitage.

In both clusters services, restaurants, souvenir shops exist and one can savour a wine typical of the area, as well as fried pork meat and Canarian wrinkly potatoes.

== Protection ==
Guayadeque valley was listed on June 21, 1991 as Spanish Heritage site as a Site of cultural interest in the category "Archaeological site" regulated by the Law of Historical Heritage of the Canaries. The royal decree 126/1991 was published in the Boletín Oficial de Cantabria on the following July 12.

It has also been declared a Natural Monument by the Law on Natural Areas of the Canaries, and is registered on the list of the European Heritage network of natural countrysides, as troglodyte zone.

== Access ==
The GC-103 road that follows the bottom of the valley starts in Agüimes from the GC-100 road that goes south to Arinaga (Note: Arinaga is located in the main industrial zone of Canaries and is one of the major ports of Spain. The GC-100 road starts nearby the Punta de Arinaga Lighthouse.) and north to Mercalaspalmas through Ingenio, Cuatro Puertas and Telde.

A visitors centre is open from Tuesday to Sunday all year round, located in a cave at the entrance of the valley.

== Gallery ==
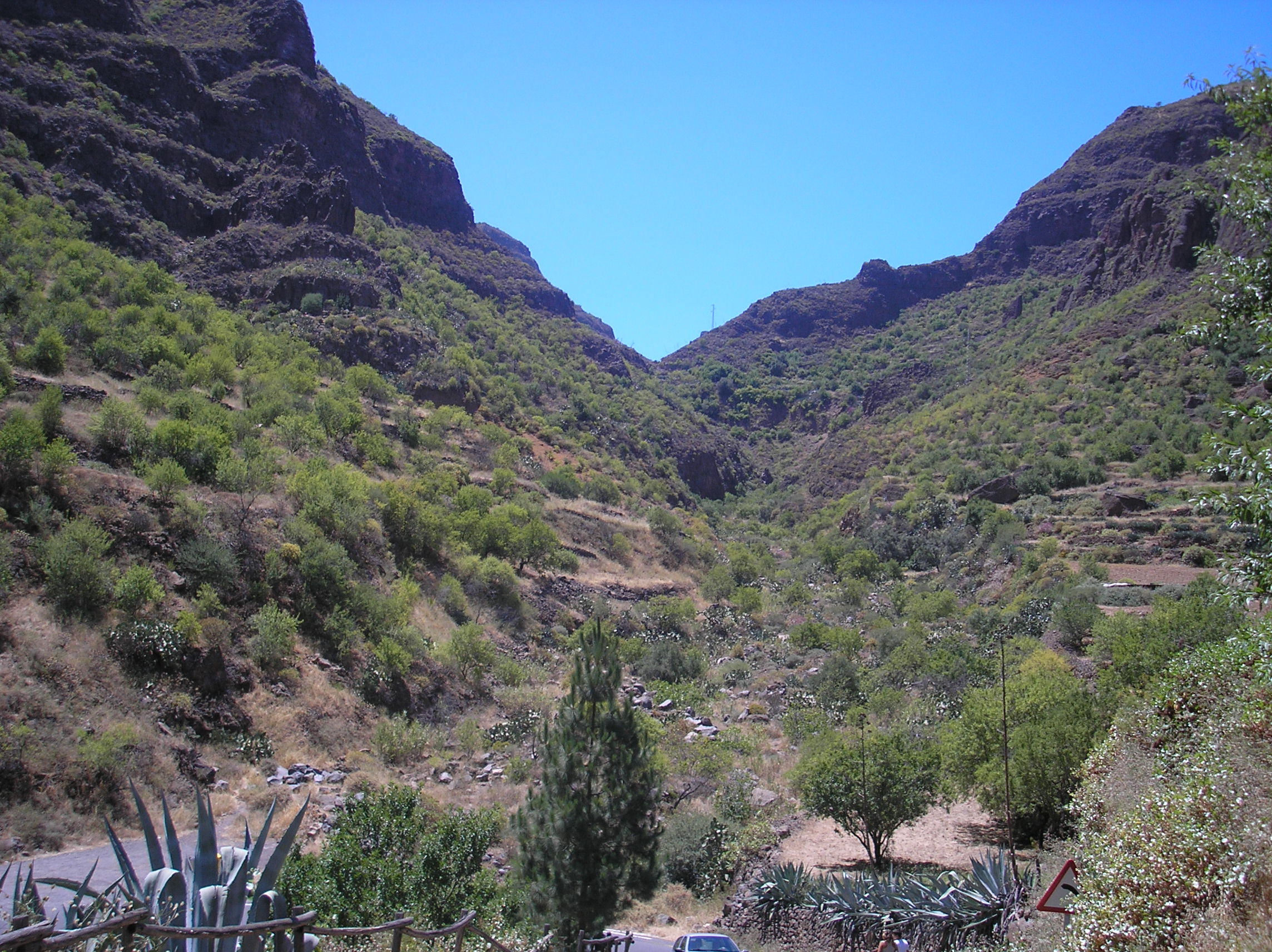
View from the S-E (the sea is behind us)

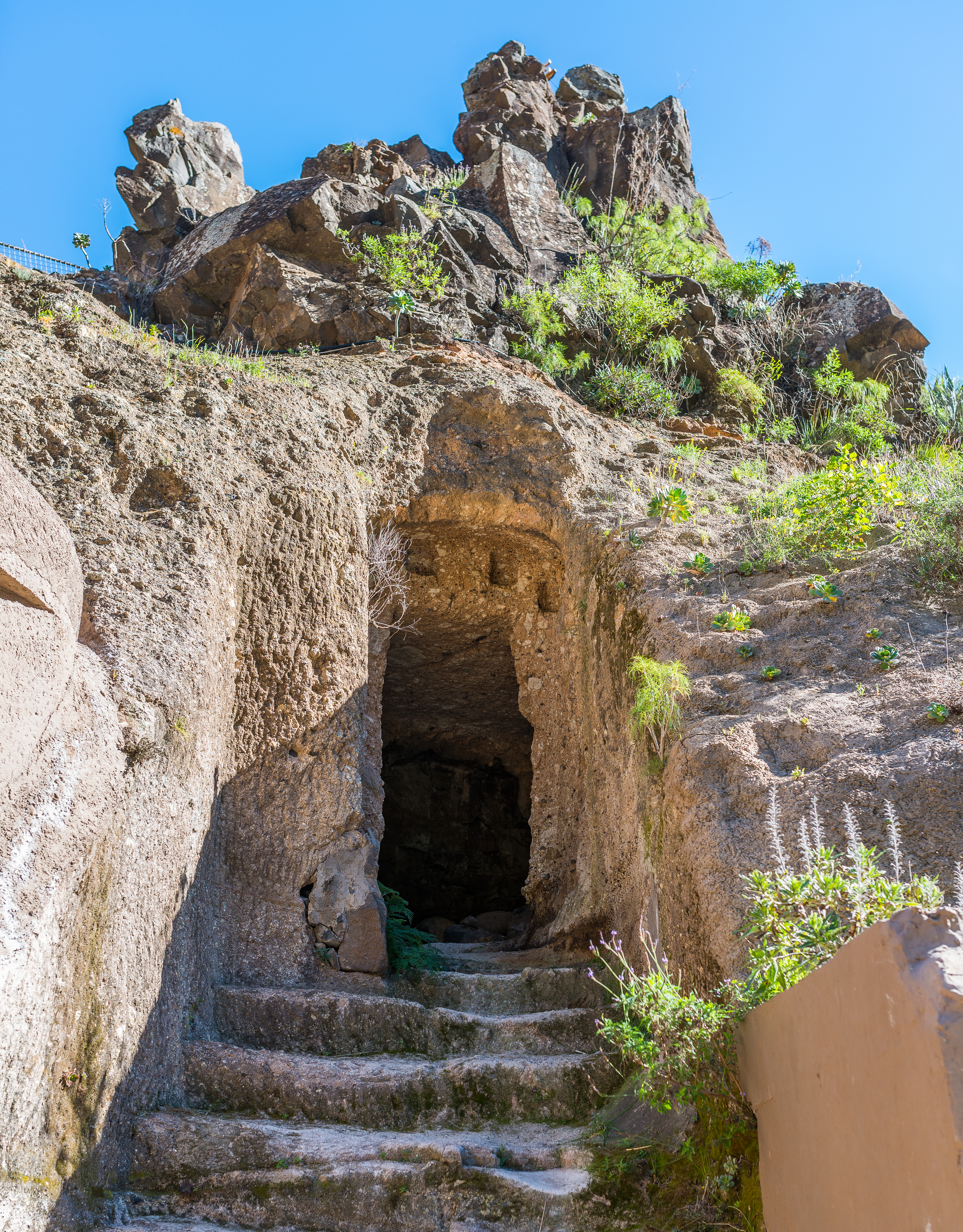
Old steps leading to a cave-house

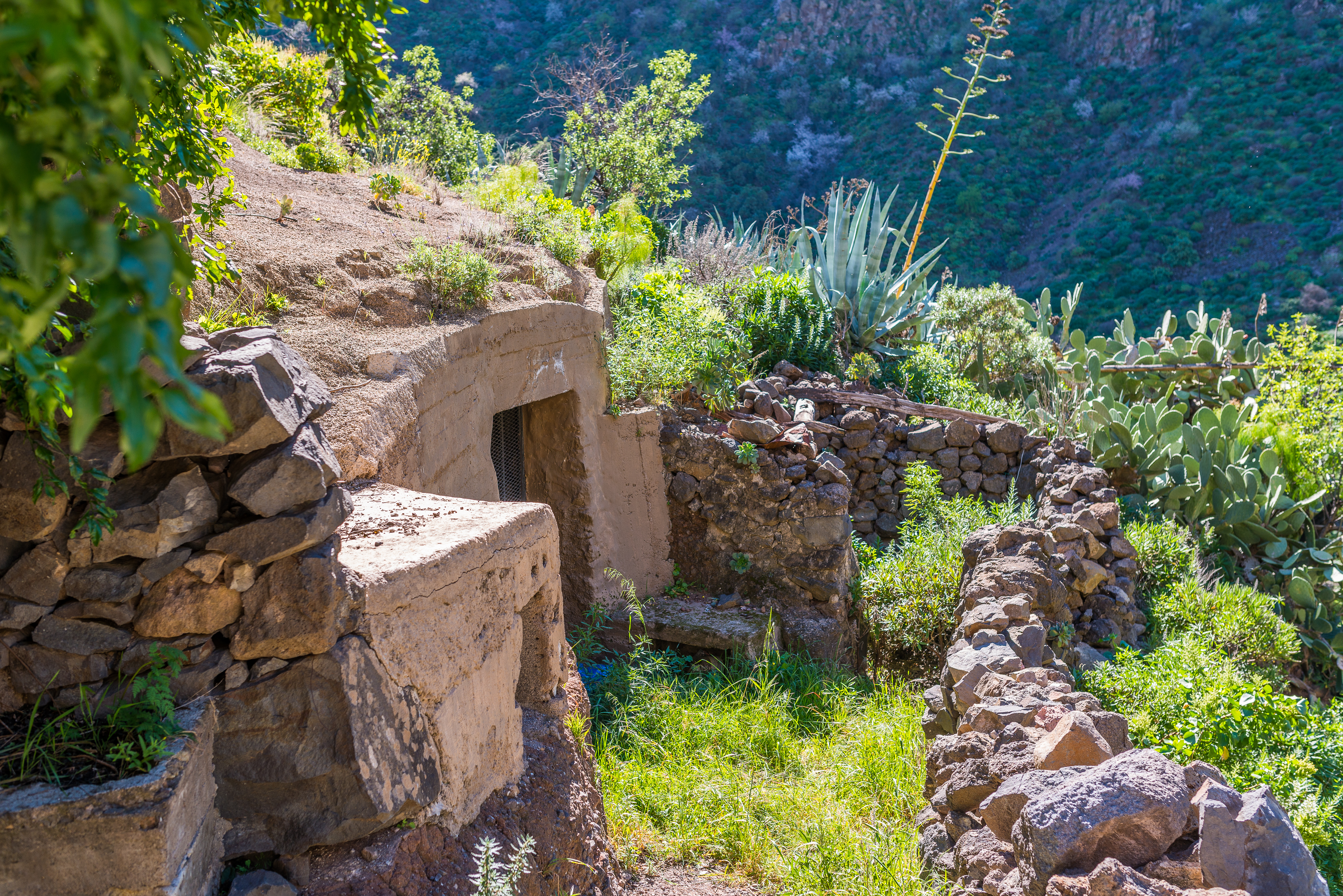
Another cave-dwelling

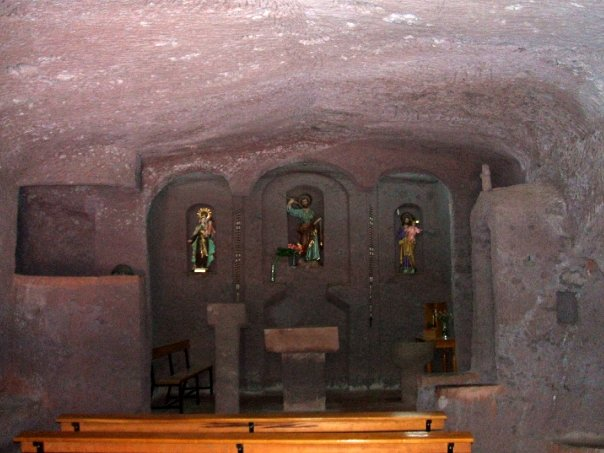
Chiesa cave chapel in Bermeja dwellings

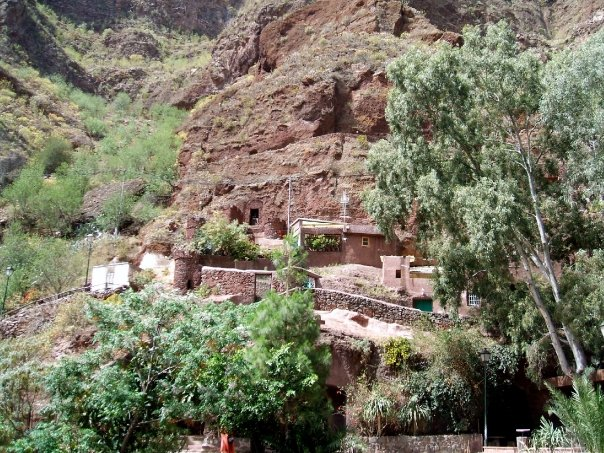
Bermeja cave, a group of houses and cave-houses

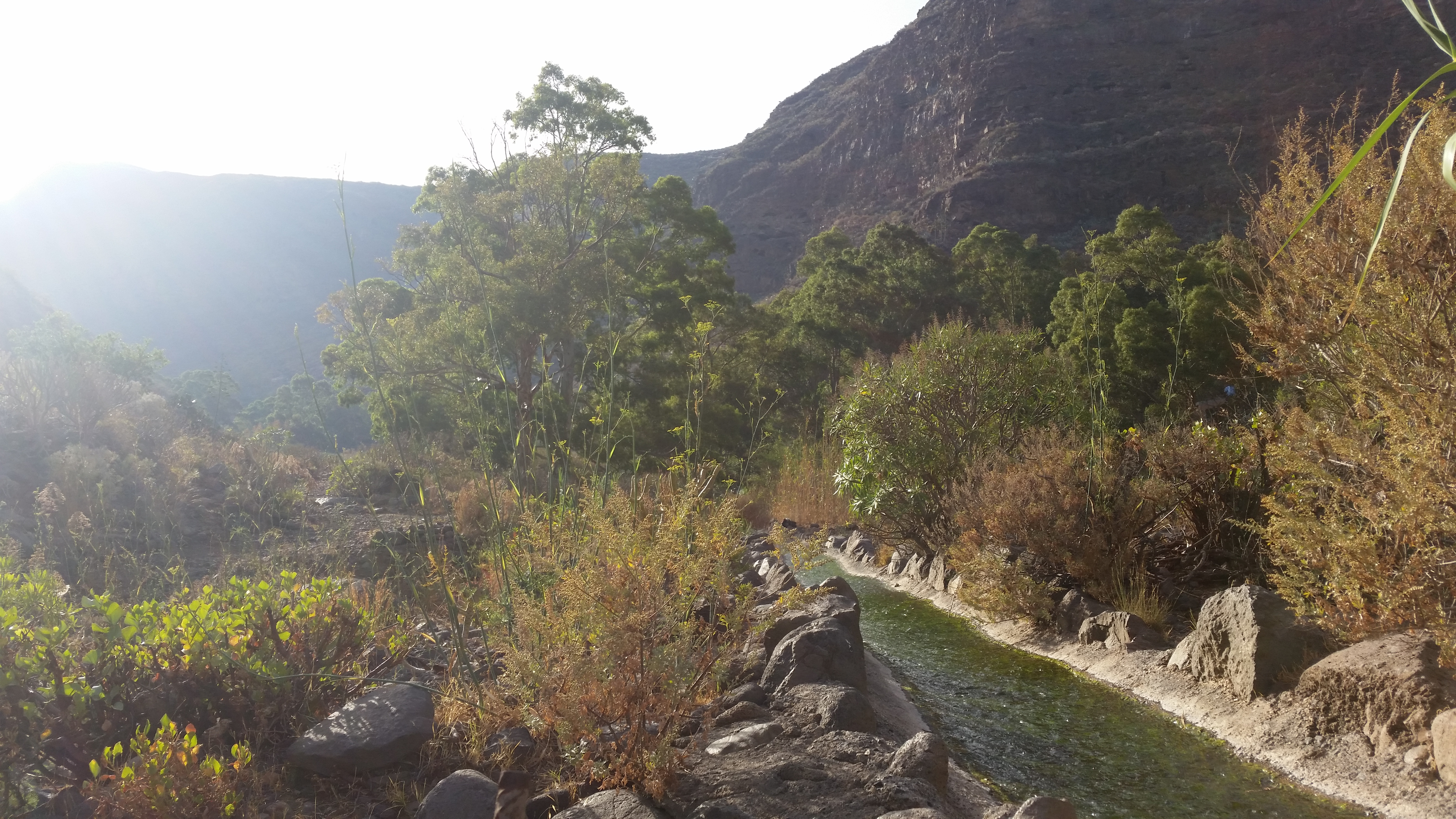
One of the streams flowing in the valley

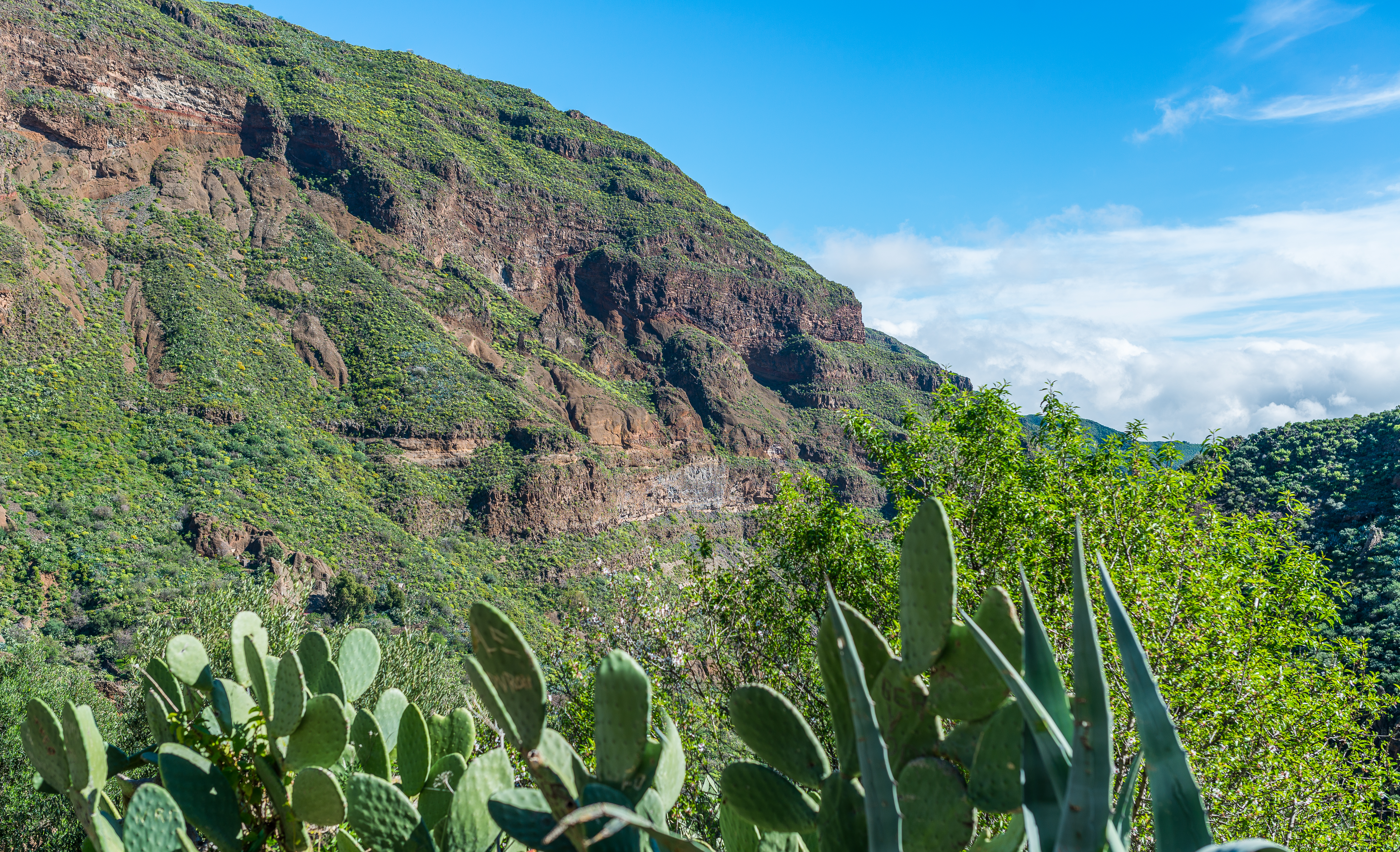
Steep slopes

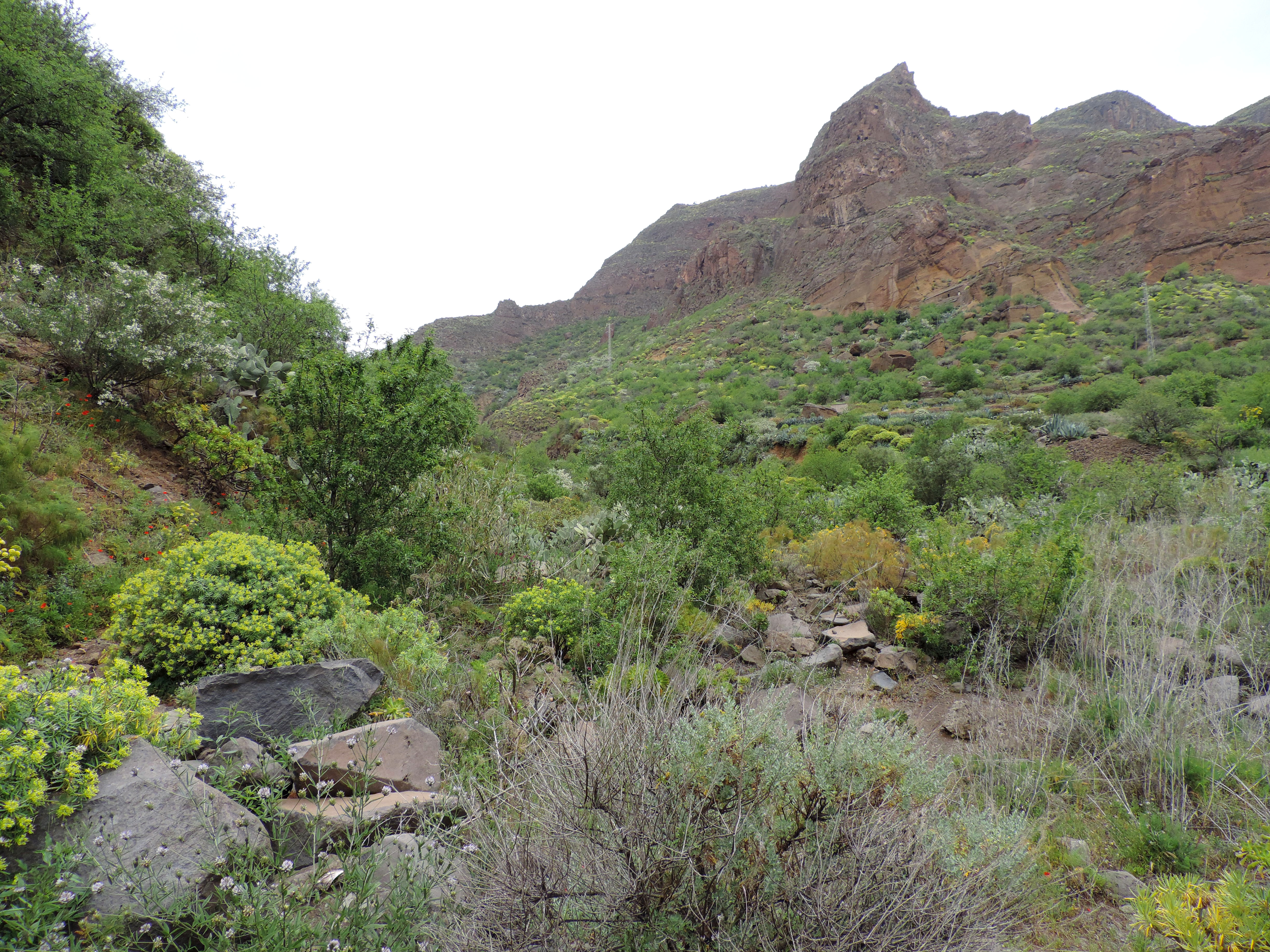
Close-up on the vegetation. Houses at the foot of the cliff, mid-plan of the photo

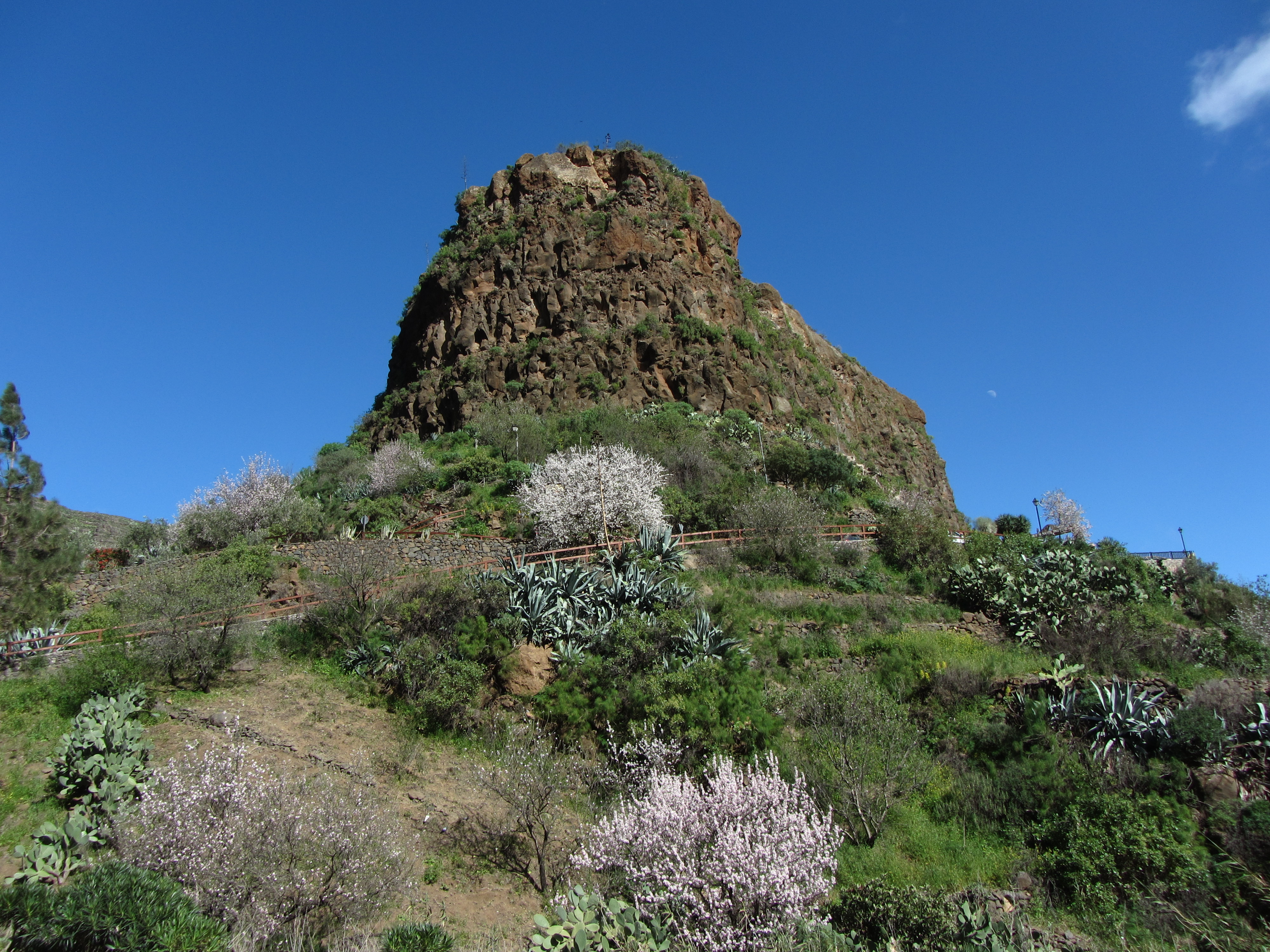
Babel mountain and blossoming almond trees

== See also ==
- Painted Cave, Galdar
