= Ingenio, Las Palmas =

Ingenio
- municipality
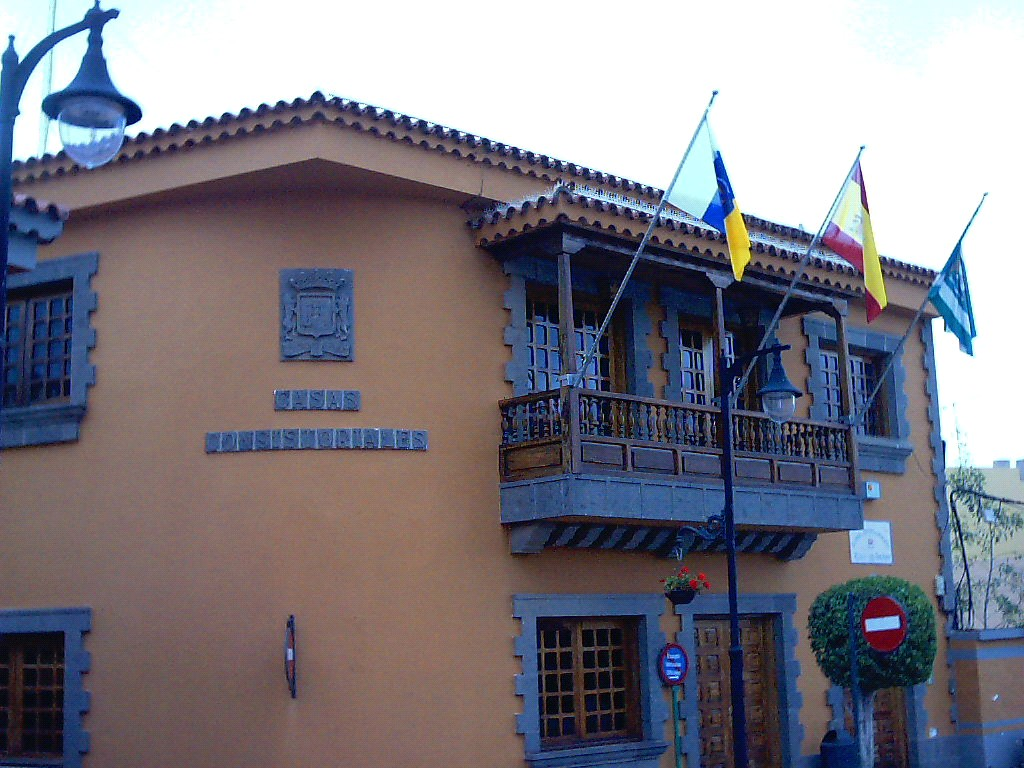
- Town hall

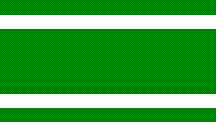
- Flag Coat of arms

- Municipal location in Gran Canaria

- Location in the province of Las Palmas Ingenio (Canary Islands) Ingenio (Spain, Canary Islands)
- Coordinates: 27°55′17″N 15°25′57″W
- Country: Spain
- Autonomous Community: Canary Islands
- Province: Las Palmas
- Island: Gran Canaria

Government
  - Mayor: Juan José Gil Méndez (PP)

Area
  - Total: 38.15 km^{2} (14.73 sq mi)
- Elevation (AMSL): 558 m (1,831 ft)

Population (2025-01-01)
  - Total: 32,905
  - Density: 862.5/km^{2} (2,234/sq mi)
- Time zone: UTC+0 (CET)
  - Summer (DST): UTC+1 (CEST (GMT +1))
- Postal code: 35250
- Area code: +34 (Spain) + 928 (Las Palmas)
- Website: www.ingenio.es

Ingenio is a town and a Spanish municipality in the eastern part of the island of Gran Canaria in the Province of Las Palmas in the Canary Islands. Its population is 29,978 (2013), and the area is 38.15 km^{2} (14.73 sq mi).

Ingenio is situated between the mountains and the Atlantic Ocean, 24 km (15 mi) south of the island's capital Las Palmas and 9 km (6 mi) south of Telde. The municipality includes the town Carrizal. The GC-1 motorway passes east of the town, and the Gran Canaria Airport is situated in the eastern part of the municipality. In agriculture, sugar cane is one of the dominant crops in Ingenio.

The municipality is home to the International Folklore Festival which has the participation of music groups worldwide including Mexico, Colombia, Romania, Russia and Uganda.

== Historical population ==
Historical population

Year	Pop.	±%
1991	21,807	—
1996	24,394	+11.9%
2001	24,439	+0.2%
2002	25,681	+5.1%

Year	Pop.	±%
2003	26,433	+2.9%
2004	26,857	+1.6%
2013	29,978	+11.6%

== See also ==
- List of municipalities in Las Palmas
