= Bañaderos Express =

Austal 118 metre trimaran

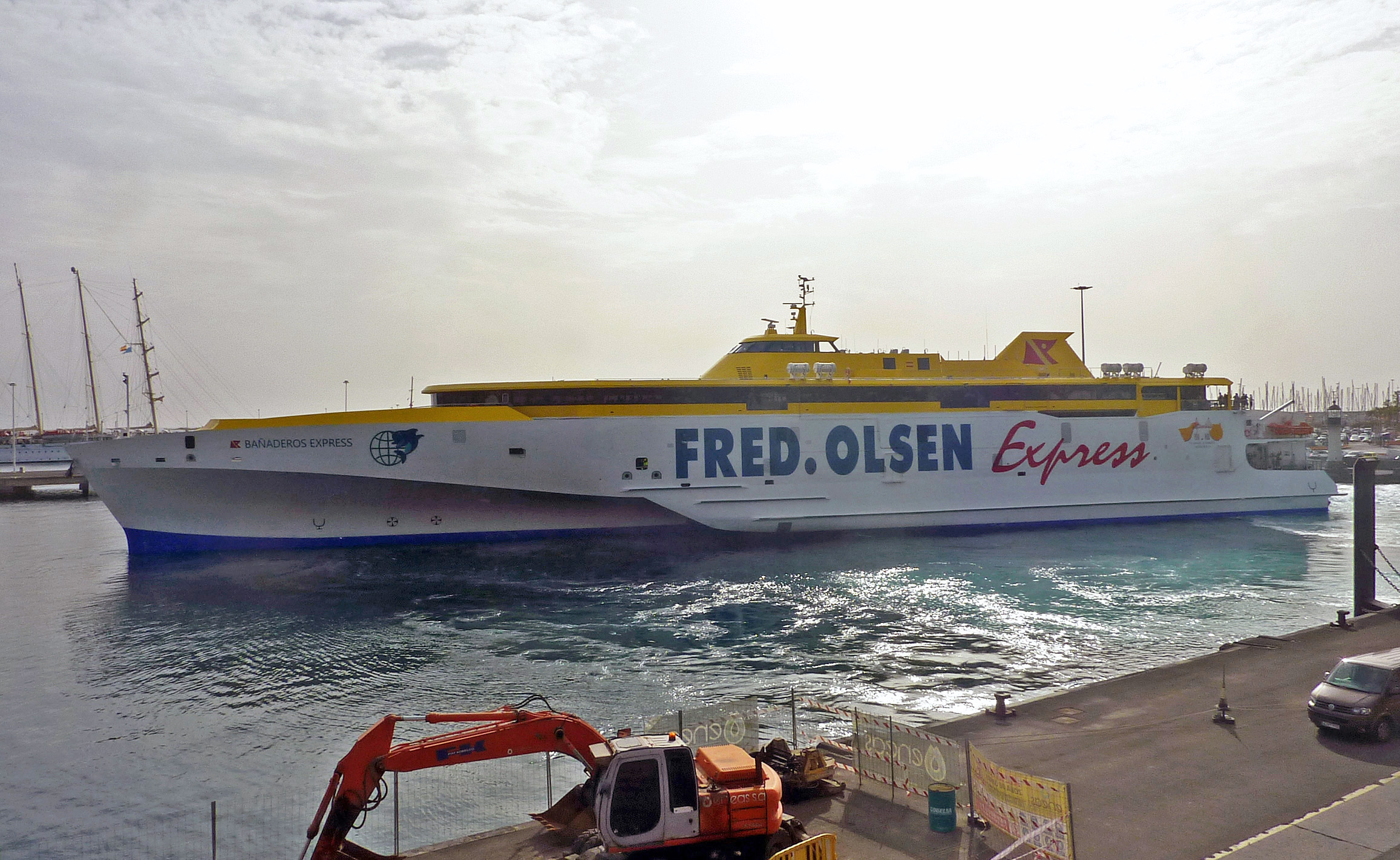
- Bañaderos Express in Santa Cruz de Tenerife

History
- Name: Bañaderos Express (2021–present)
- Owner: Fred. Olsen Express
- Operator: Fred. Olsen Express
- Port of registry: Santa Cruz de Tenerife, Spain
- Route: Santa Cruz de Tenerife – Agaete
- Ordered: November 2017
- Builder: Austal Philippines; Balamban, Philippines
- Yard number: 395
- Laid down: 2018
- Launched: May 2021
- Completed: October 2021
- Acquired: October 2021
- Maiden voyage: November 2021
- In service: 2021
- Identification: IMO number: 9874301; Call sign: EBTZ; MMSI number: 224388000
- Status: In service

General characteristics
- Class & type: Austal Auto Express 118 Trimaran
- Tonnage: 8,044 GT; 750 DWT
- Length: 118.00 m (387 ft 2 in)
- Beam: 28.48 m (93 ft 5 in)
- Height: 8.04 m (26 ft 5 in)
- Draft: 4.20 m (13 ft 9 in)
- Decks: 2
- Ramps: Rear loading ramps
- Installed power: 4 × MTU 20V 8000 M71L diesel engines (total 36,400 kW / 48,800 hp)
- Propulsion: 4 × Kongsberg KaMeWa 125 S3 waterjets
- Speed: 38.0 knots (70.4 km/h; 43.7 mph) (service) 42.0 knots (77.8 km/h; 48.3 mph) (max)
- Capacity: 1,100 passengers; 276 cars (or 350 lane metres for freight plus 100 cars)
- Crew: 30
- Notes: Sister ship to Bajamar Express

Bañaderos Express is a 118-metre high-speed trimaran passenger and vehicle ferry operated by the Spanish shipping line Fred. Olsen Express. Built by Austal Philippines in Balamban and delivered in October 2021, she is the second vessel in Austal's Auto Express 118 trimaran series for Fred. Olsen Express, serving as the direct sister ship to Australia-built Bajamar Express. The vessel operates high-speed inter-island ferry services in the Canary Islands, primarily linking Santa Cruz de Tenerife with Agaete (Gran Canaria).

== Service ==
The trimaran, the second of a series of two sister units commissioned on 10 October 2017 by Fred. Olsen Express to the Austal special shipyardsof Cebu, was launched on 27 April 2021 with the name of Bañaderos Expressand delivered on 5 October to the Spanish company. Following this, the fast ferry sailed from the Philippines to the Canary Islands, where it began service a few months later on the connections between Agaete and Santa Cruz de Tenerife, alongside its sister ship Bajamar Express.
