= Bajamar Express =

High-speed trimaran

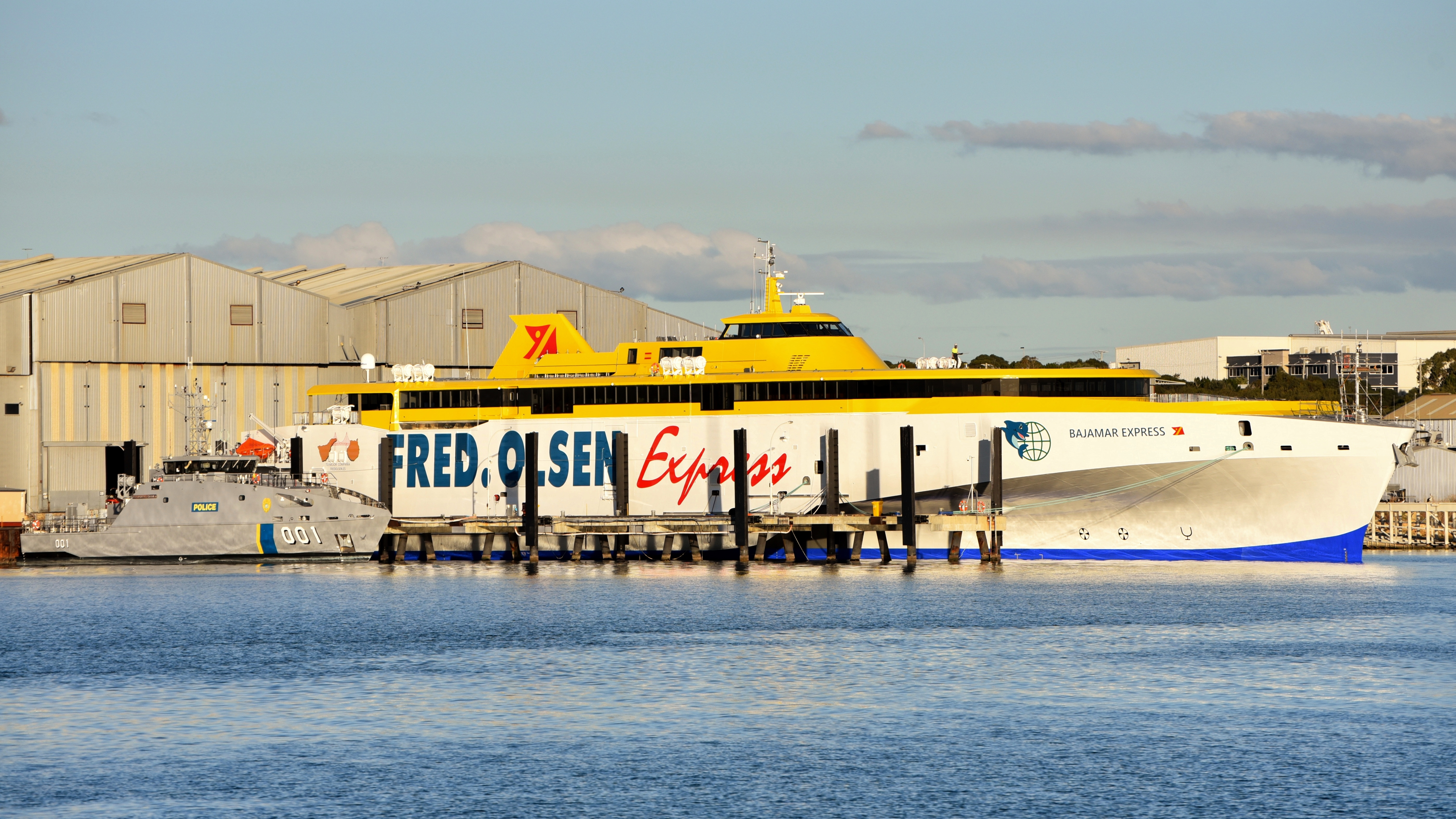
- Bajamar Express in Henderson

History
- Name: Bajamar Express (2020–present)
- Owner: Fred. Olsen Express
- Operator: Fred. Olsen Express
- Port of registry: Santa Cruz de Tenerife, Spain
- Route: Santa Cruz de Tenerife – Agaete
- Ordered: November 2017
- Builder: Austal Australia; Henderson, Australia
- Yard number: 394
- Laid down: 2018
- Launched: February 2020
- Completed: May 2020
- Acquired: July 2020
- Maiden voyage: August 2020
- In service: 2020
- Identification: IMO number: 9874296; Call sign: EBDJ; MMSI number: 225992988
- Status: In service

General characteristics
- Class & type: Austal Auto Express 118 Trimaran
- Tonnage: 12,328 GT; 750 DWT
- Length: 118.00 m (387 ft 2 in)
- Beam: 28.48 m (93 ft 5 in)
- Height: 8.00 m (26 ft 3 in)
- Draft: 4.20 m (13 ft 9 in)
- Decks: 2
- Ramps: Rear loading ramps
- Installed power: 4 × MTU 20V 8000 M71L diesel engines (total 36,400 kW / 48,800 hp)
- Propulsion: 4 × KaMeWa 125 S3 waterjets
- Speed: 38.0 knots (70.4 km/h; 43.7 mph) (service) 42.0 knots (77.8 km/h; 48.3 mph) (max)
- Capacity: 1,100 passengers; 276 cars (or 350 lane metres for freight plus 100 cars)
- Crew: 30
- Notes: Sister ship to Bañaderos Express

Bajamar Express is a 118-metre high-speed trimaran vehicle and passenger ferry operated by Spanish shipping line Fred. Olsen Express. Built in Australia by Austal Ships and delivered in May 2020, she is part of Austal's Auto Express 118 trimaran design. Bajamar Express operates high-speed inter-island ferry connections in the Canary Islands, primarily linking Santa Cruz de Tenerife with Agaete (Gran Canaria) alongside her sister ship, Bañaderos Express.

== Service ==
The trimaran, the first of a series of two sister units commissioned on 10 October 2017 by Fred. Olsen Express to the Austal special shipyards in Fremantle, was launched on 5 February 2020 with the name Bajamar Express and delivered on 7 July to the Spanish company. Following this, the fast ferry sailed from Australia to the Canary Islands, where it began service in August on the connections between Agaete and Santa Cruz de Tenerife. Just over a year later, in October 2021, the trimaran was temporarily transferred to the connections between Las Palmas de Gran Canaria and Morro Jable, being replaced on the route by the Bencomo Express and the Bentago Express. At the end of the assignment it returned to serve its own route, where it joined its sister ship Bañaderos Express, recently arrived in Spain from the Philippines.
