= El Maipés Necropolis =

Cultural property in Agaete, Spain

El Maipes necropolis, Agaete
- Necrópolis del Maipés de Agaete or Necrópolis de Maipés de Arriba (Spanish)
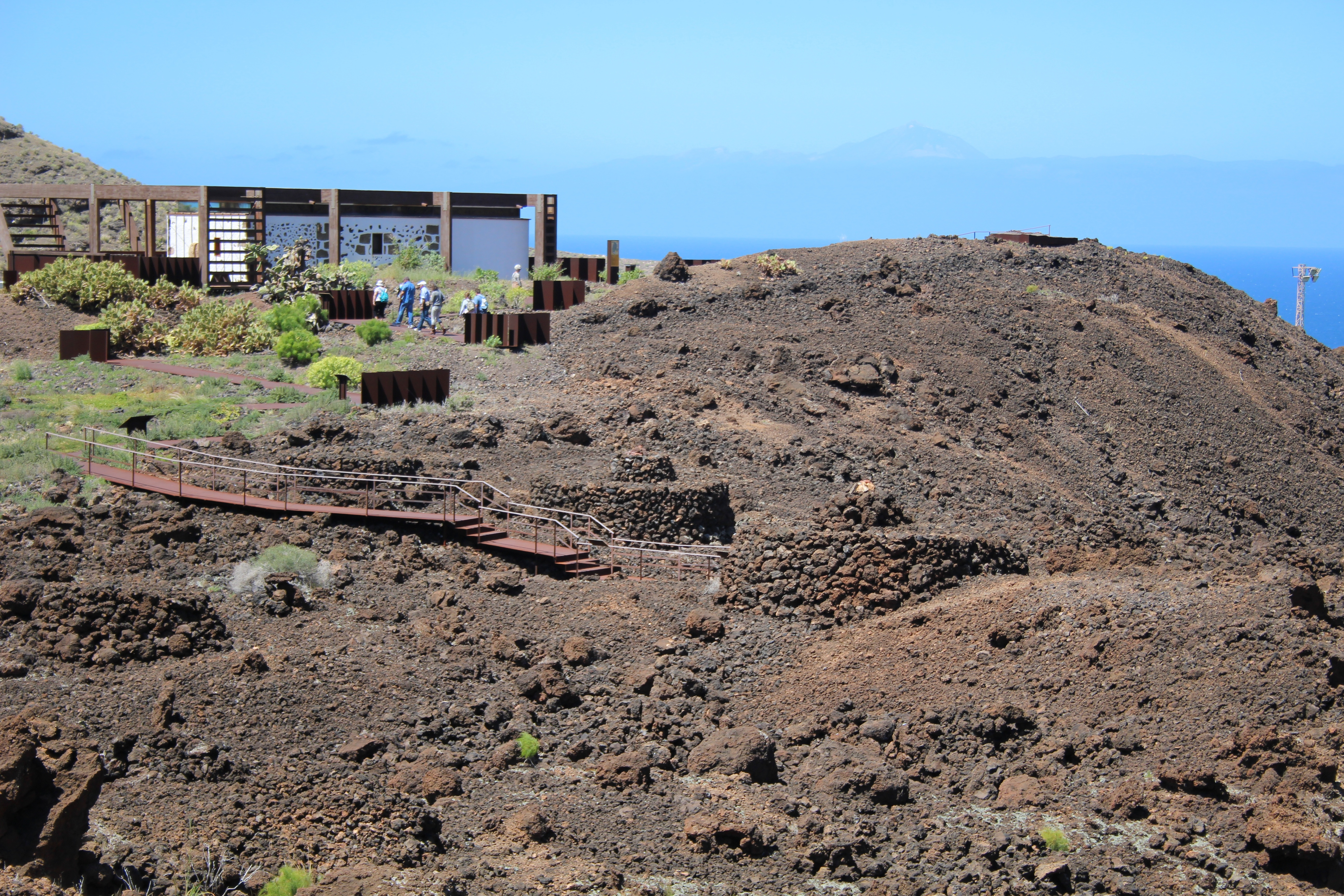

- Location of El Maipés necropolis on Gran Canaria island
- 28°05′51.6840″N 15°41′44.1096″W
- Type: tumuli
- Etymology: Mal país
- Location: Grand Canaria, Canary Islands
- Nearest city: Agaete

Site notes
- Website: www.maipesdeagaete.com

Spanish Cultural Heritage
- Criteria: Artistic-Historic Heritage
- Designated: 1973
- Archaeological site: 1992

The El Maipés necropolis (Spanish: necropolis del Maipés) is an ancient burial site near Agaete on the Spanish island of Grand Canary, province of Las Palmas in the Canary Islands of the west coast of Africa.

Second-largest necropolis of the Canaries after that of Arteara, the site is listed Spanish Heritage as a Property of cultural interest in the category "archaeological zone". Its particular geology, and subsequently its vegetation are also of notable interest.

== Location and access ==
The little town of Agaete is on the north-west coast of Grand Canary island, at the end of the GC-2 road that links Agaete to Las Palmas, the archipelago's co-capital 32 km to the east of Agaete. The Maipes necropolis is found in the south-east of Agaete, 200 ft west of the football ground.

It is about 10 mns' walk away from the centre of Agaete. If driving, follow the signs to El Valle and the archaeological park.

== Toponymy ==
The name Maipés comes from the word malpais or mal pais, which means "bad land". This is due to the flow of volcanic lava that covered the bottom of the Maipés ravine about 3,000 years ago.

== Description ==
The Maipes necropolis is one of the most spectacular burial sites on the island. It covers more than one square km with around 600 or 700 or more small tumuli, dating from the 8th to 10th centuries. Some of the tumuli are more than 1,300 years old, which gives them the same range of age as those in the Arteara necropolis.

The tumuli sit on volcanic ground, more precisely on an old lava flow that came out of the nearby volcanoes Jabelobo, Berrazales and Fagajesto.

The eruption brought forth an 11 km-wide flow of lava that followed the valley and reached the sea at Puerto de las Nieves. Later, the cemetery was established on a stretch of lava covering 25 ha (some 62 acres). After the Spanish conquest of the islands, some of that lava was covered with soil to allow for some farming.

The tumuli are also built of volcanic rocks. Most of them are built on elliptic or round plans with a truncated cone outline. Some of them reach 8 m diameter and 3 m in height. Inside each tumulus is a pit with its sides marked by stone slabs, in which the deceased bodies were placed. Some coffins have also been found inside some tumuli.

The size and building refinement vary noticeably among the tumuli, indicating the social ranks of their occupiers. The particularity of some of these small tumuli are the stones that crown them, which are of different colours and texture than the surrounding volcanic material. The most common ones are a simple ring of volcanic stones, the more sophisticated ones are topped with turret-type stonework and were probably used to bury nobility.

Most of the tumuli are occupied by a single individual; some shelter two individuals. Some children have also been buried in the cemetery.

Part of the cemetery space has been surrounded with a dry-stone wall. Some tumuli were built beyond that wall; 8 corpses were found there. Historians think that these people were either Canarians deemed unworthy of burial in the proper ground, or foreigners having landed on the island before the Spanish conquest.

Traces left by a tsunami

The site bears traces of one of the rare tsunami to be documented in the Canaries. It was created by a volcanic emission in the municipality of Güímar in Tenerife. These traces consist of white stains of marine deposits left behind by the tsunami waves beating on the steep sides of the valley.

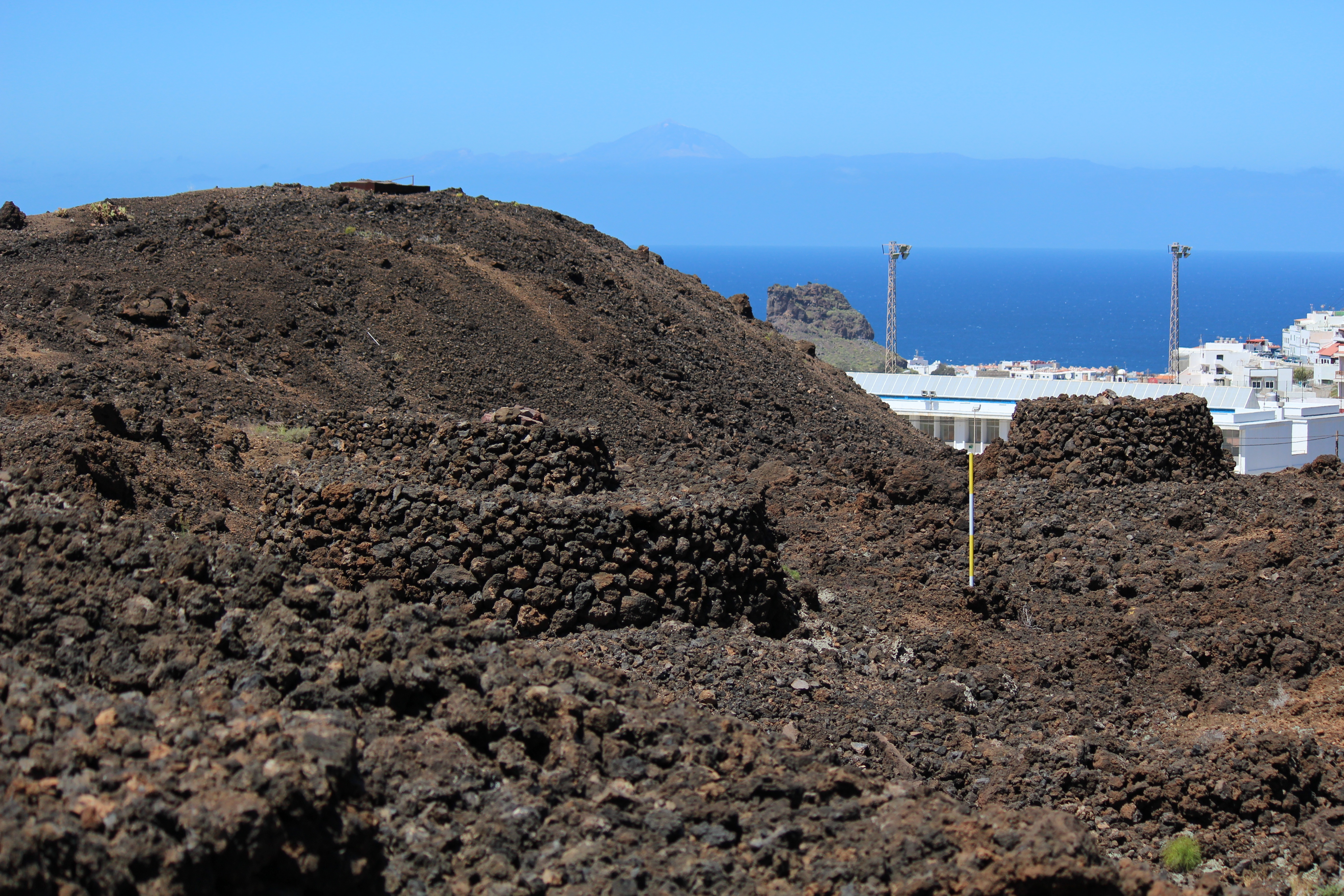

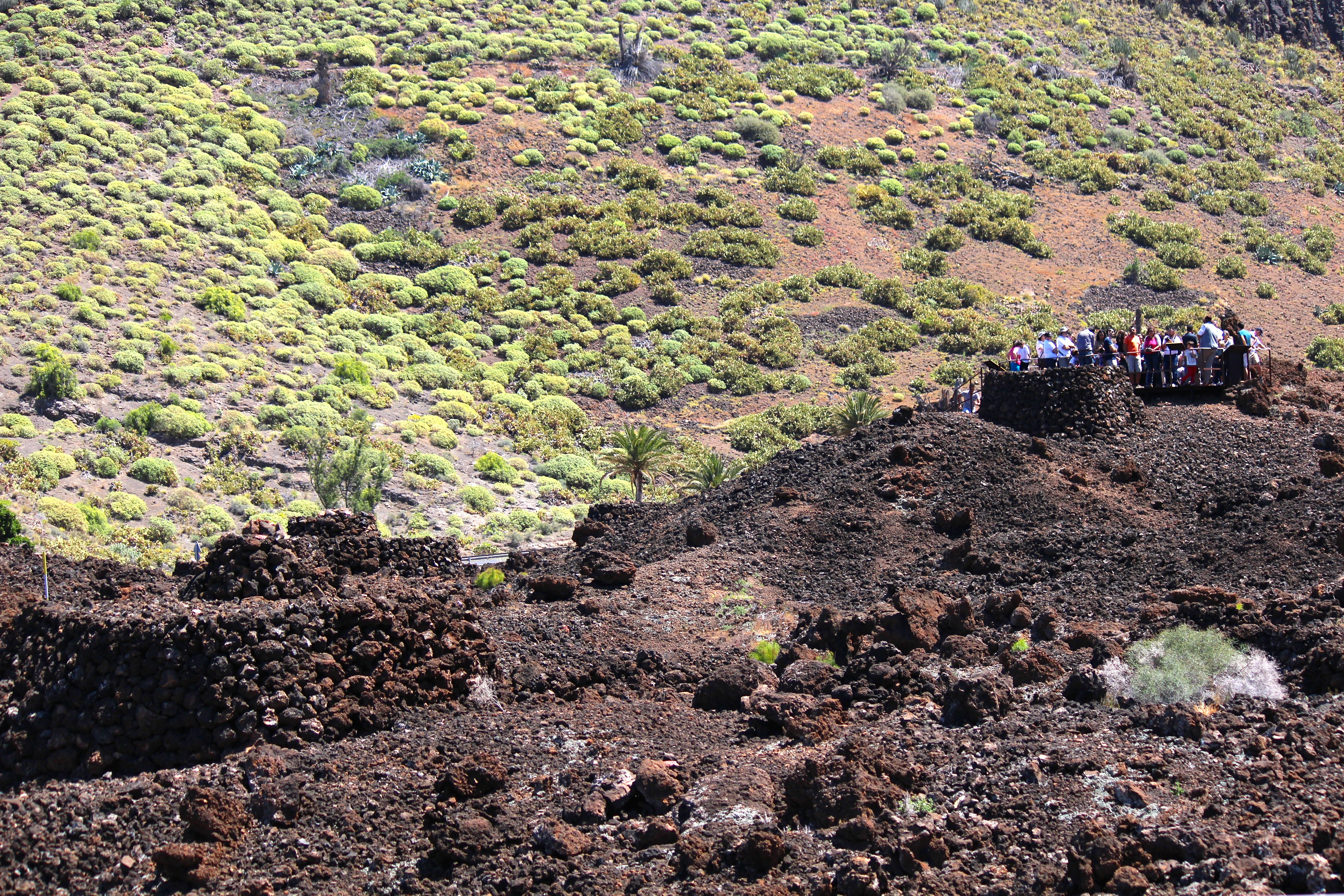

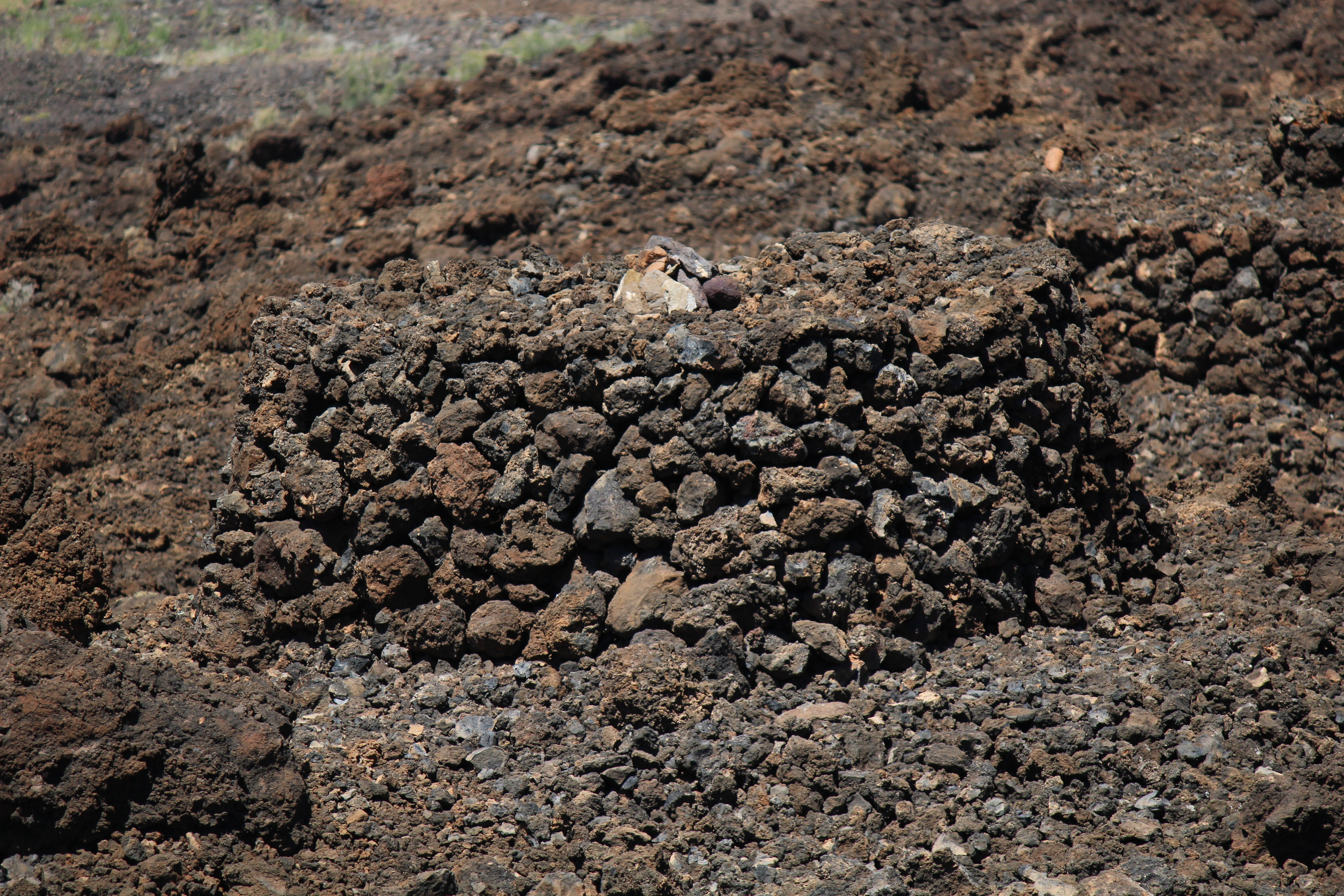

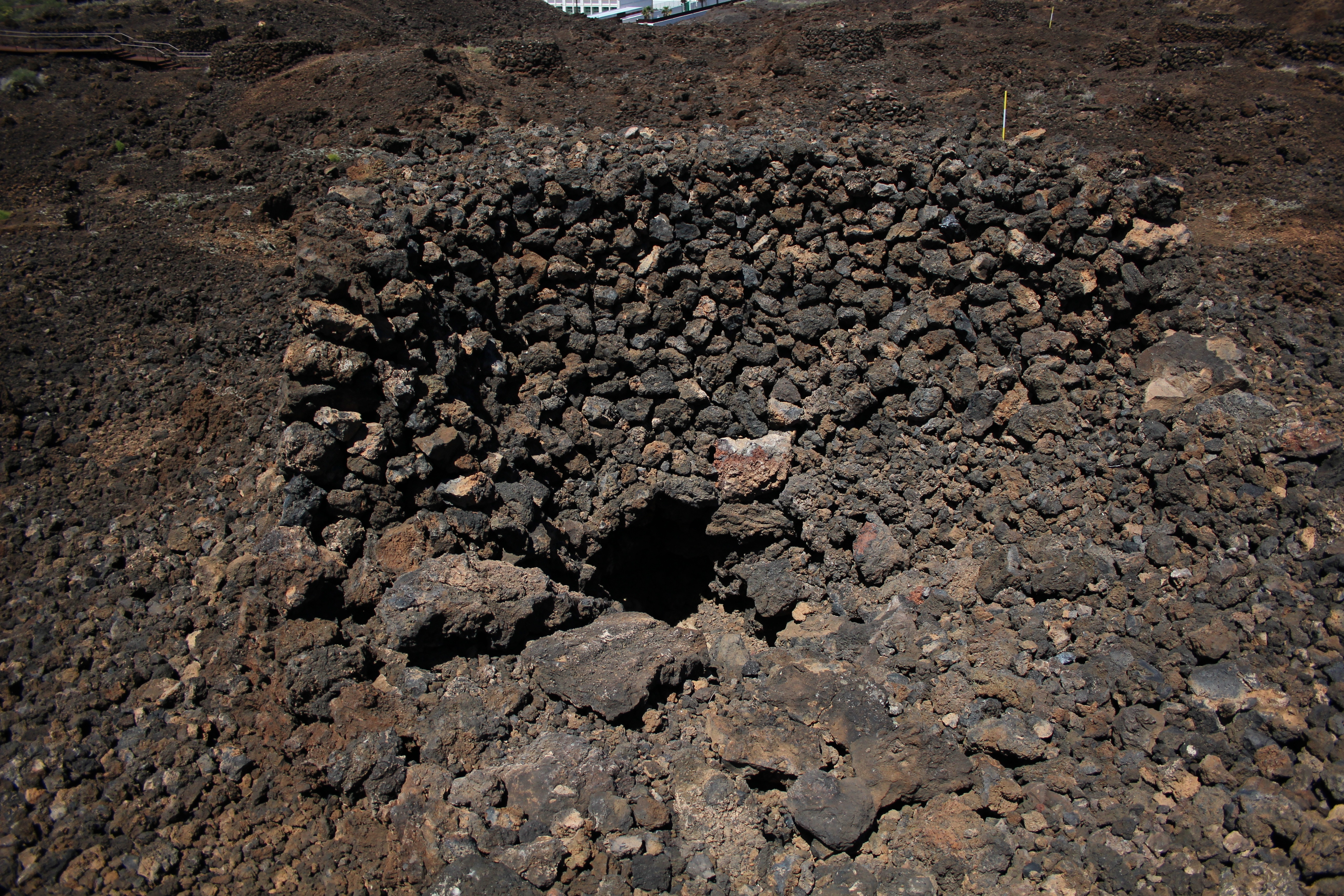
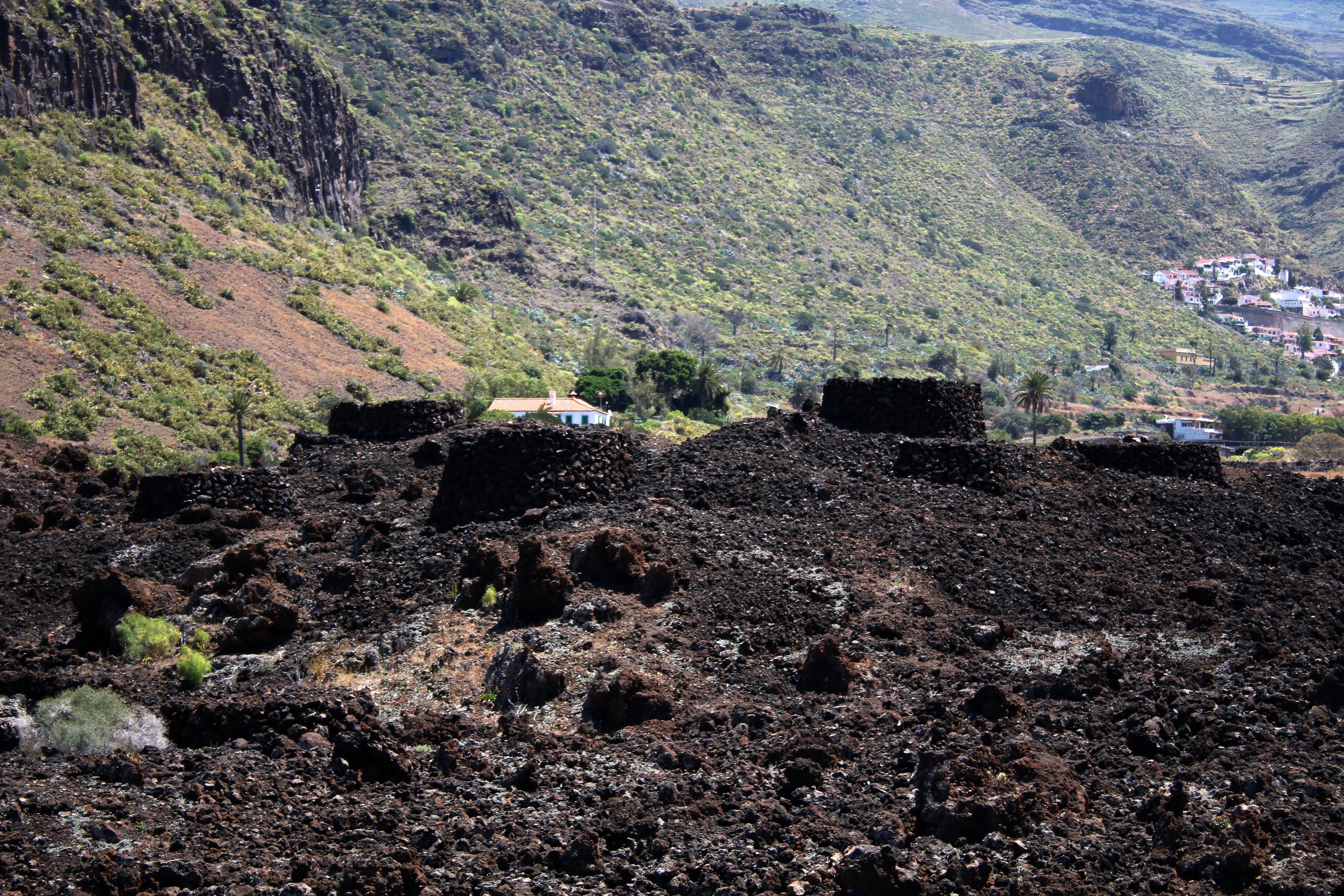

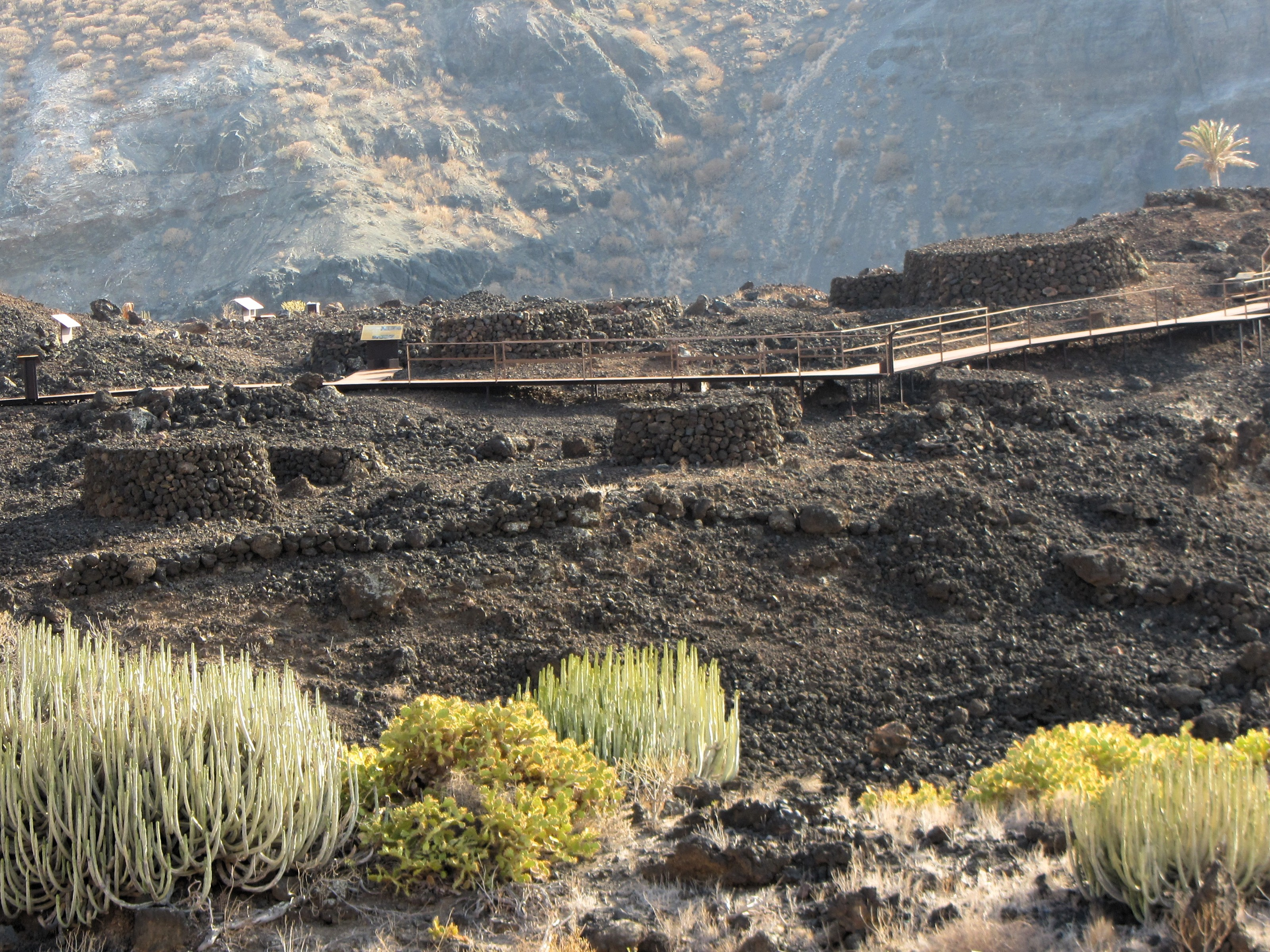

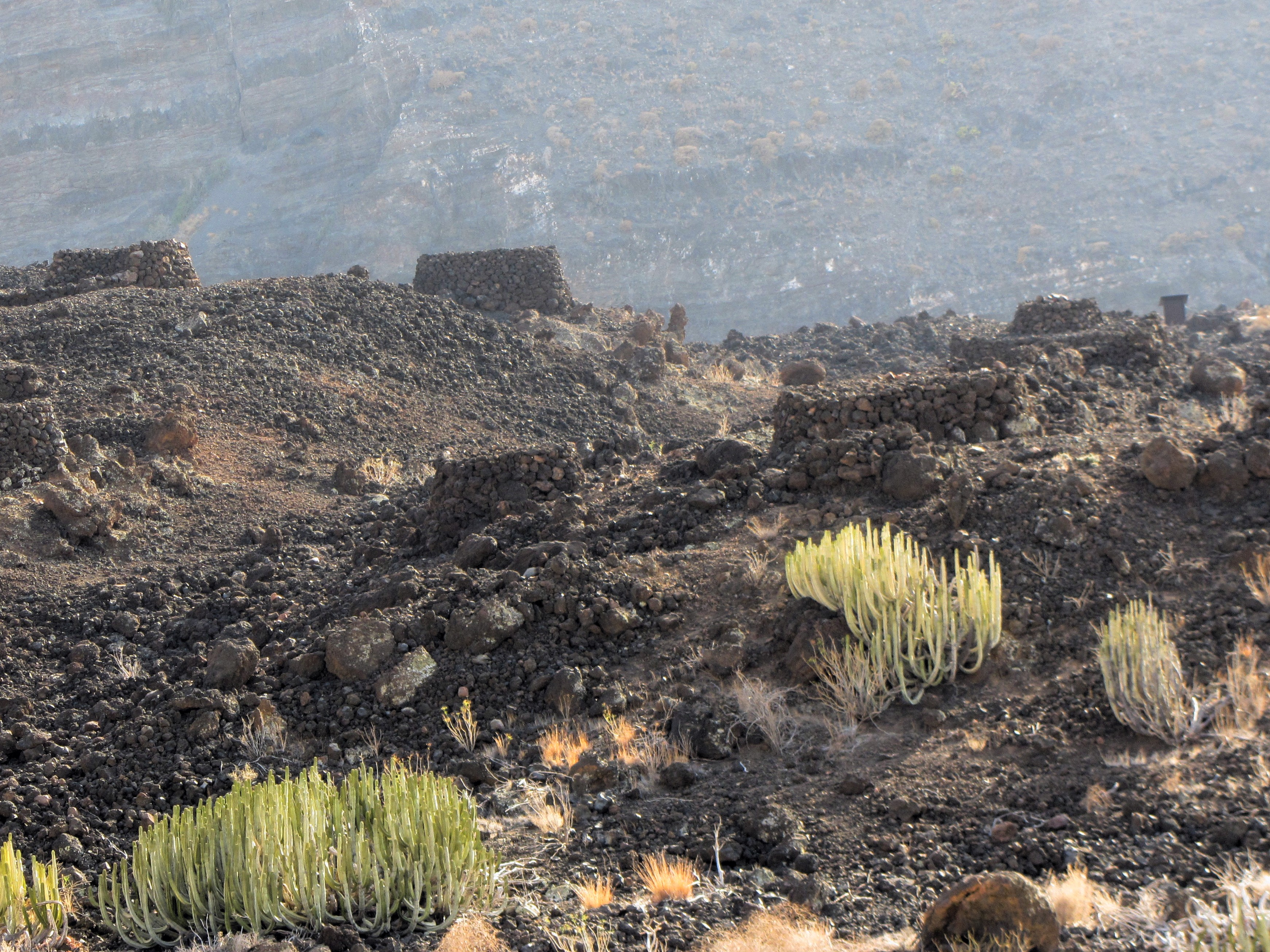

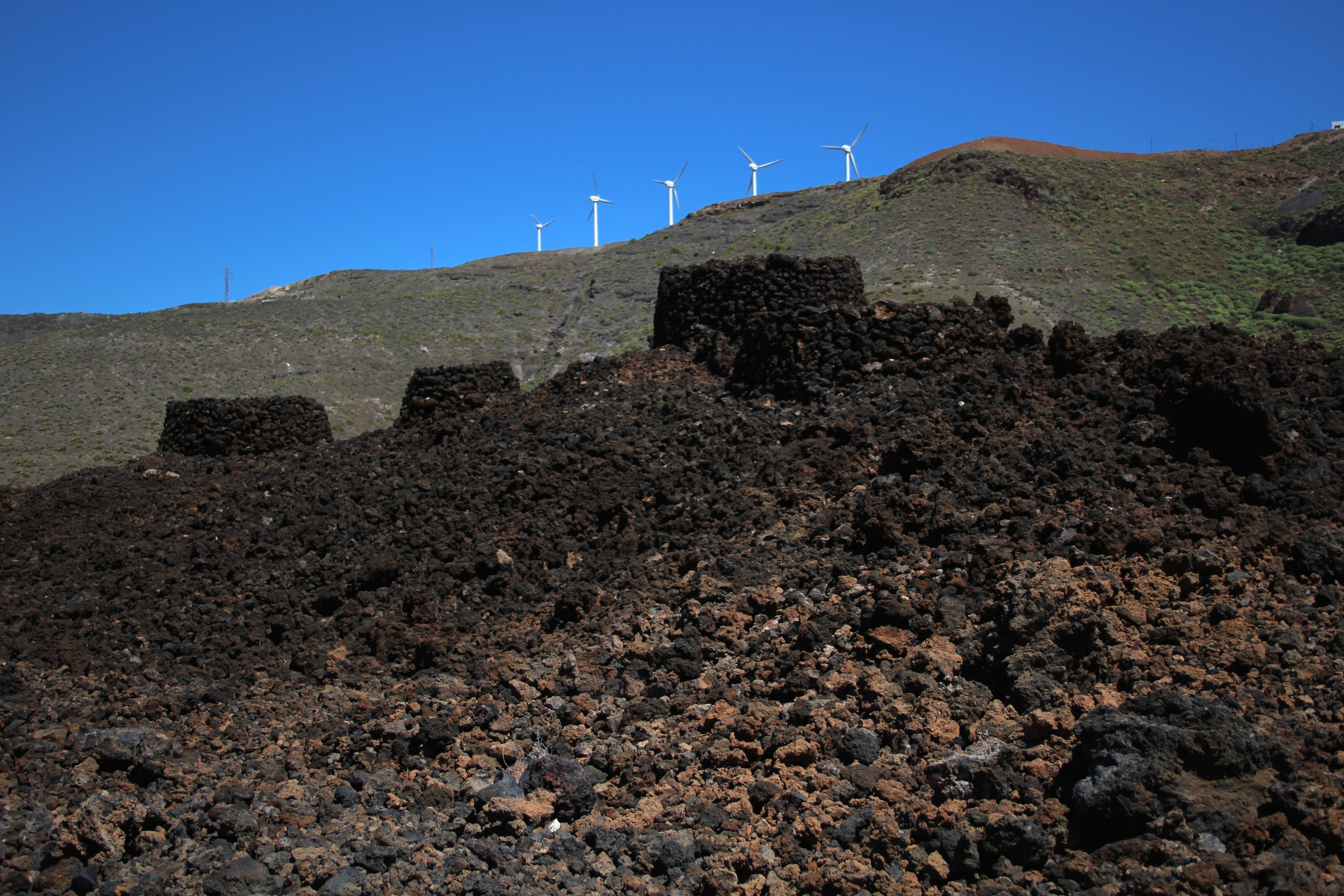
Wind turbines above the necropolis

== Conservation issues ==
On July 5, 1973, the necropolis was declared Historic Heritage in the category "Artistic-Historic" (official declaration in B.O.E. (Note: B.O.E.: Boletín Oficial de España.) N° 181, July 30, 1973). In 1992, following a modification of the law on Spanish Historic Heritage properties on June 25, 1985, the site became a Property of cultural interest in the category "archaeological zone" under the code RI-55-0000082. As such it is part of the Network of archaeological parks of Grand Canary.

Some restoration works started in 2008, including discovery paths with information panels, installations allowing for wheelchair access to part of the site and an information centre (Centro de Interpretación). The refurbished site was opened on April 16, 2013. It is now opened all year-round.

== Other archaeological parks in Grand Canary ==
The Network of Archaeological parks of Grand Canary open to the public also includes the Four Doors cave site in Telde, the caves of Valeron (cenobio de Valeron) in Santa Maria de Guia, the Arteara necropolis in Fataga, the Cats' ravine (cañada de los Gatos) on Mogán beach near Puerto de Mogan, Bentayga Rock (roque Bentayga) in Tejeda, and the Painted cave (cueva Pintada) museum and archaeological park in Galdar.

== Similar structures ==
- the Arteara necropolis near Fataga village in the municipality of San Bartolomé de Tirajana
- the Maspalomas necropolis in Las Naves de Lomo Gordo, municipality of San Bartolomé de Tirajana; discovered in 1988

== Bibliography ==
- Mederos Martin, Alfredo; Escribano Cobo, Gabriel (2002). Los aborígenes y la prehistoria de Canarias. Centro de la Cultura Popular Canaria. ISBN 84-7926-382-2.
