= Austal 118 metre trimaran =

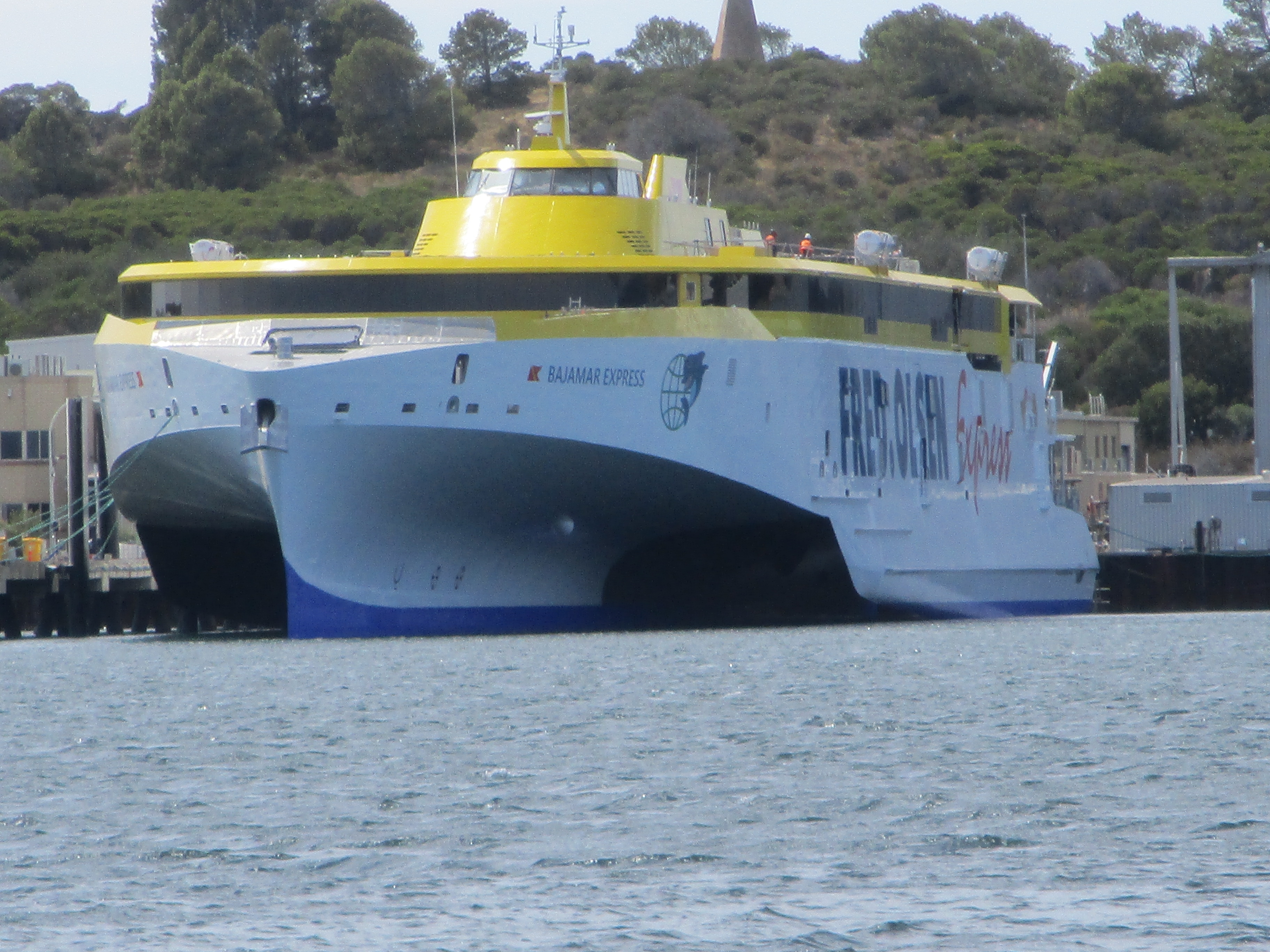
Bajamar Express at Austal prior to delivery

The 118 metre trimaran is a class of high speed trimaran ferries designed and built by Australian shipbuilder Austal for the Canary Islands operator Fred. Olsen Express. Two ships of the design were ordered in 2017 for delivery in 2020 and 2021.

The vessels were ordered in November 2017, at a cost of AU$190 million (€126million), with construction planned to begin the following year. The lead ship of the class, Bajamar Express, was launched from Austal's Henderson, Western Australia shipyard in January 2020, while the following vessel, Bañaderos Express, was built at the company's facility in Balamban, Philippines. Bajamar Express was delivered in mid-2020, and entered service in August, with Bañaderos Express scheduled to follow in early 2021.

Ships of the class are 118 metres (387 ft) long, with a beam of 28.2 metres (93 ft) and a draft of 4.2 metres (14 ft). They have a deadweight tonnage of 750 tonnes, with a capacity of 1,100 passengers and 278 vehicles. Each ship is powered by four 9,100 kilowatts (12,200 hp) MTU M71L diesel engines driving four Kamewa waterjets, giving a service speed of 38 knots (70 km/h) and a range of 711 miles (1,144 km).
