= El Dedo de Dios =

Sea stack in the Atlantic Ocean off Gran Canaria

Coordinates: 28°05′47″N 15°42′29″W

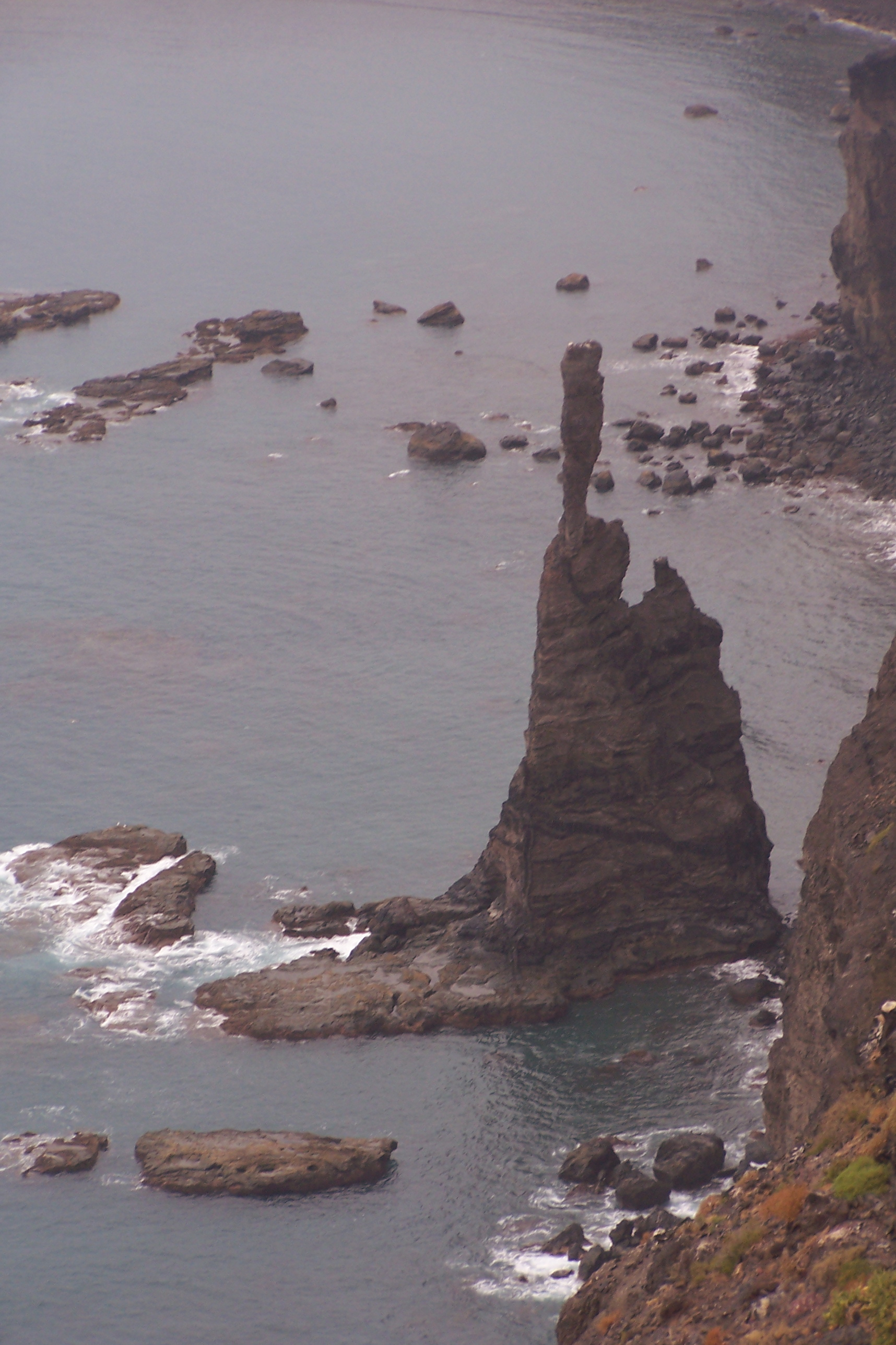
Dedo de Dios in September 2005

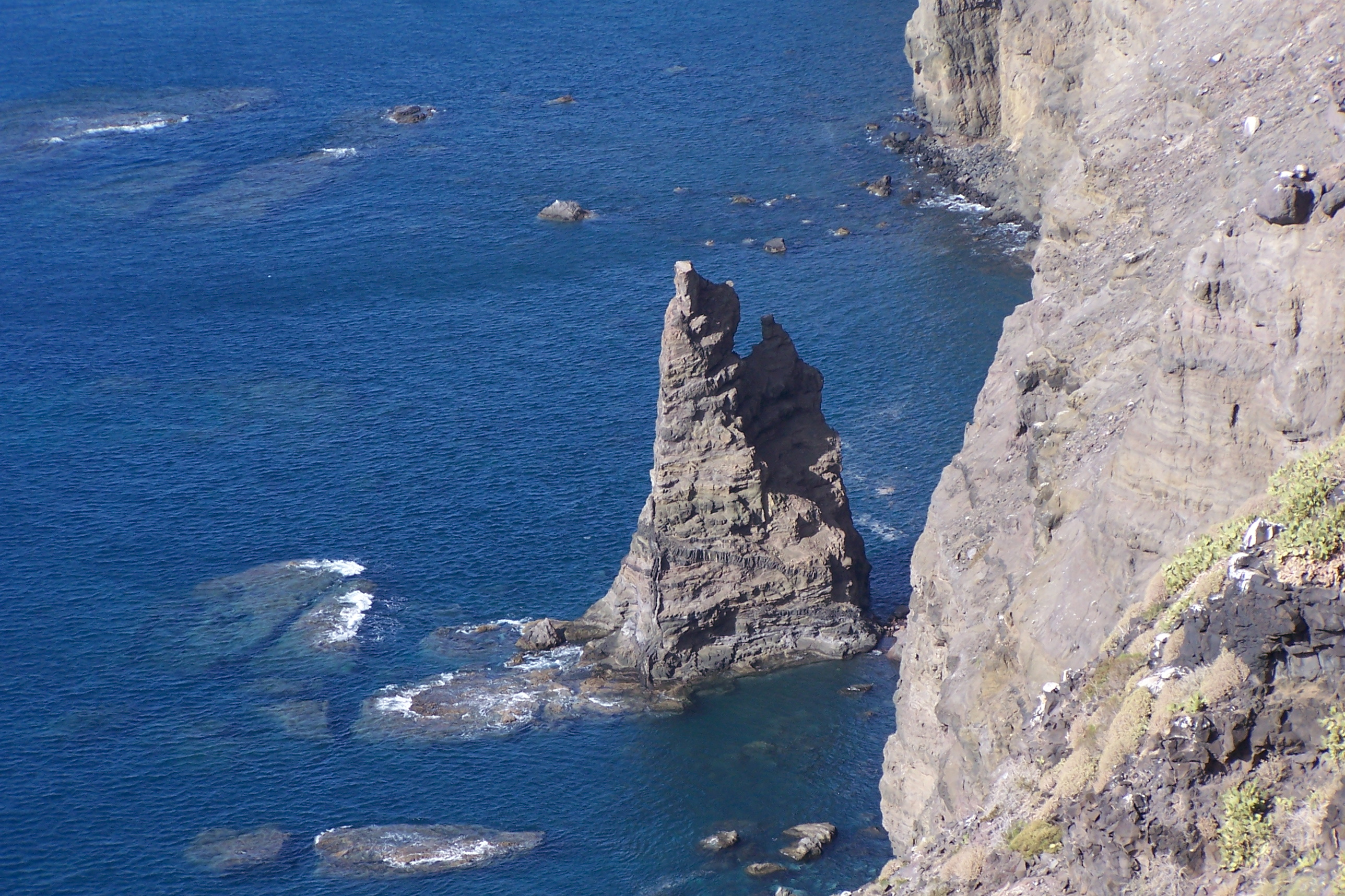
Dedo de Dios in December 2005

El Dedo de Dios (translated: God's finger) is a 30 m (98 ft) high sea stack in the Atlantic Ocean, off the northern part of Gran Canaria, one of the Canary Islands. During Tropical Storm Delta in November 2005, the thin top of this geological formation broke off and fell into the sea.

It is one of the many natural monuments outside the coastal town of Agaete on Gran Canaria. The peculiarly shaped rock has been an inspiration to many artists, and it is believed that the author Domingo Doreste was the first to name it God's finger.

Geologically, the area is the oldest on Gran Canaria, having started to form around 14 million years ago. Over a period of 200–300,000 years, the oddly shaped monument was created from the basaltic materials in the area.

== Reconstruction ==
After "God's finger" broke off, investigations started on what should be done. Eventually, a commission of experts, set up by the town of Agaete, advised in March 2006 against reconstructing the natural monument and proposed to set up a plan for conserving what is left of the emblematic rock.
