= Agaete =

- Municipality
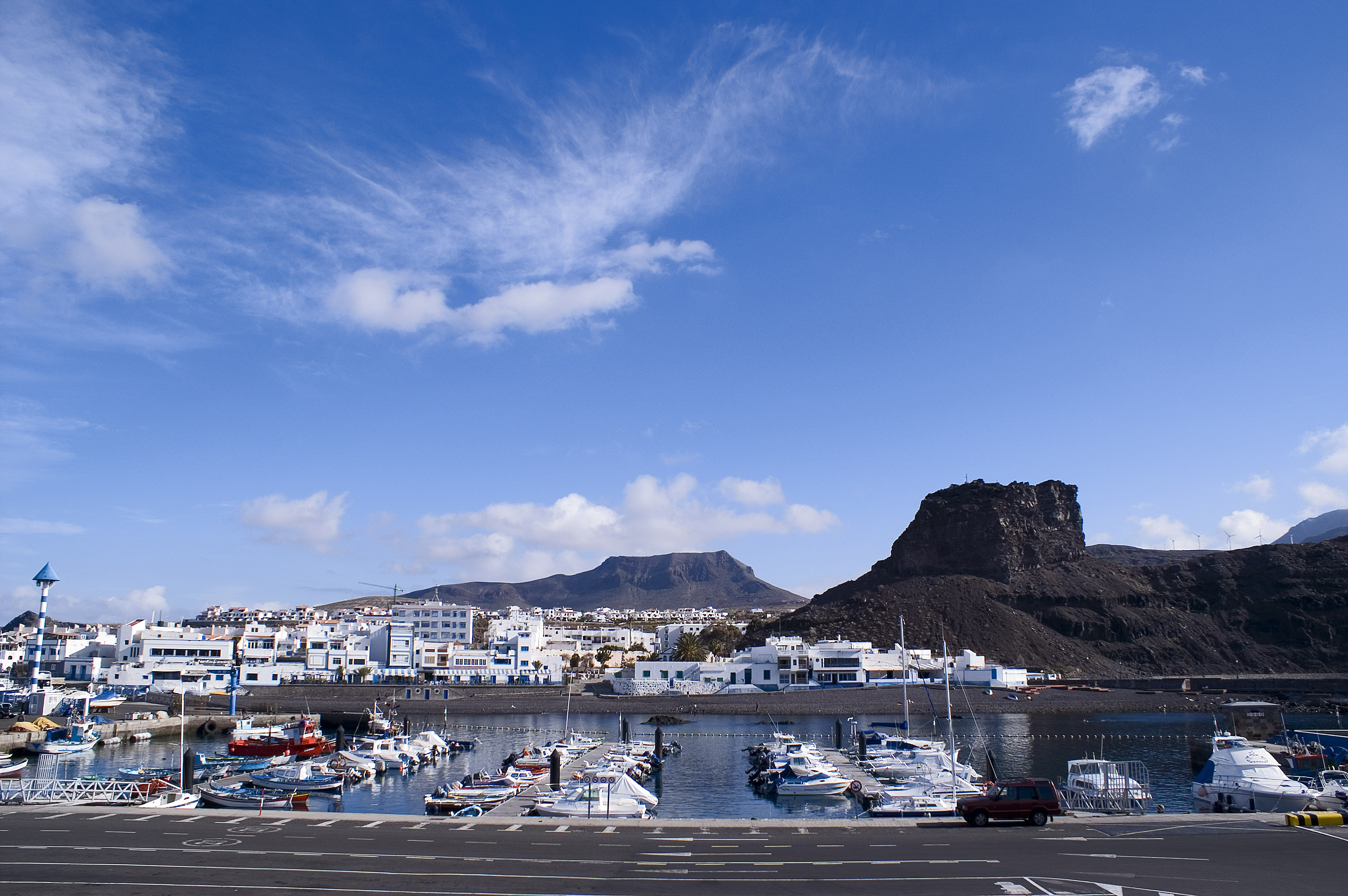
- Puerto de las Nieves (Port of the Snows)

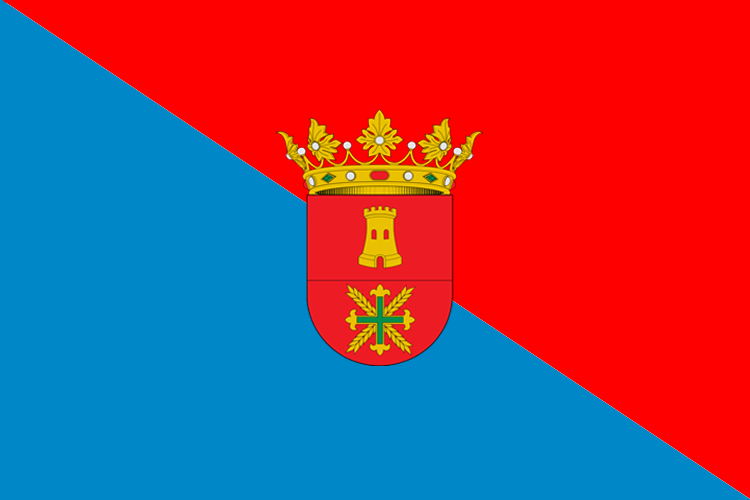
- Flag Coat of arms
- Nickname: culeto
- Agaete municipality in Gran Canaria

- Location in the province of Las Palmas Agaete (Canary Islands) Agaete (Spain, Canary Islands)
- Coordinates: 28°6′N 15°42′W
- Country: Spain
- Autonomous Region: Canary Islands
- Province: Las Palmas
- Island: Gran Canaria

Government

Area
  - Total: 45.50 km^{2} (17.57 sq mi)
- Elevation: 43 m (141 ft)

Population (2025-01-01)
  - Total: 5,683
  - Density: 124.9/km^{2} (323.5/sq mi)
- Time zone: UTC+0 (GMT)
- Climate: BWh
- Website: Ayuntamiento de Agaete

Agaete is a municipality of Las Palmas province, on the Canary Islands, Spain.

== Geography ==
It is in the north-west of Gran Canaria island, and is enclosed by the Atlantic Ocean to the west, Gáldar to the north-east, and Artenara to the south. Agaete's area is 45.50 km^{2} (17.57 sq mi) with a population of 5,796 (2003).

== Tourism ==
The port of Agaete, Puerto de las Nieves, used to be the preferred place to get a view of El Dedo de Dios, a natural monument on the coastline, before the latter was destroyed during tropical storm Delta in November 2005. The port is a common end point for day tours from more touristic areas of the island.

== Archaeology ==
El Maipes necropolis is on the outskirts of the town, in the south-east near the football ground.

== Gallery ==
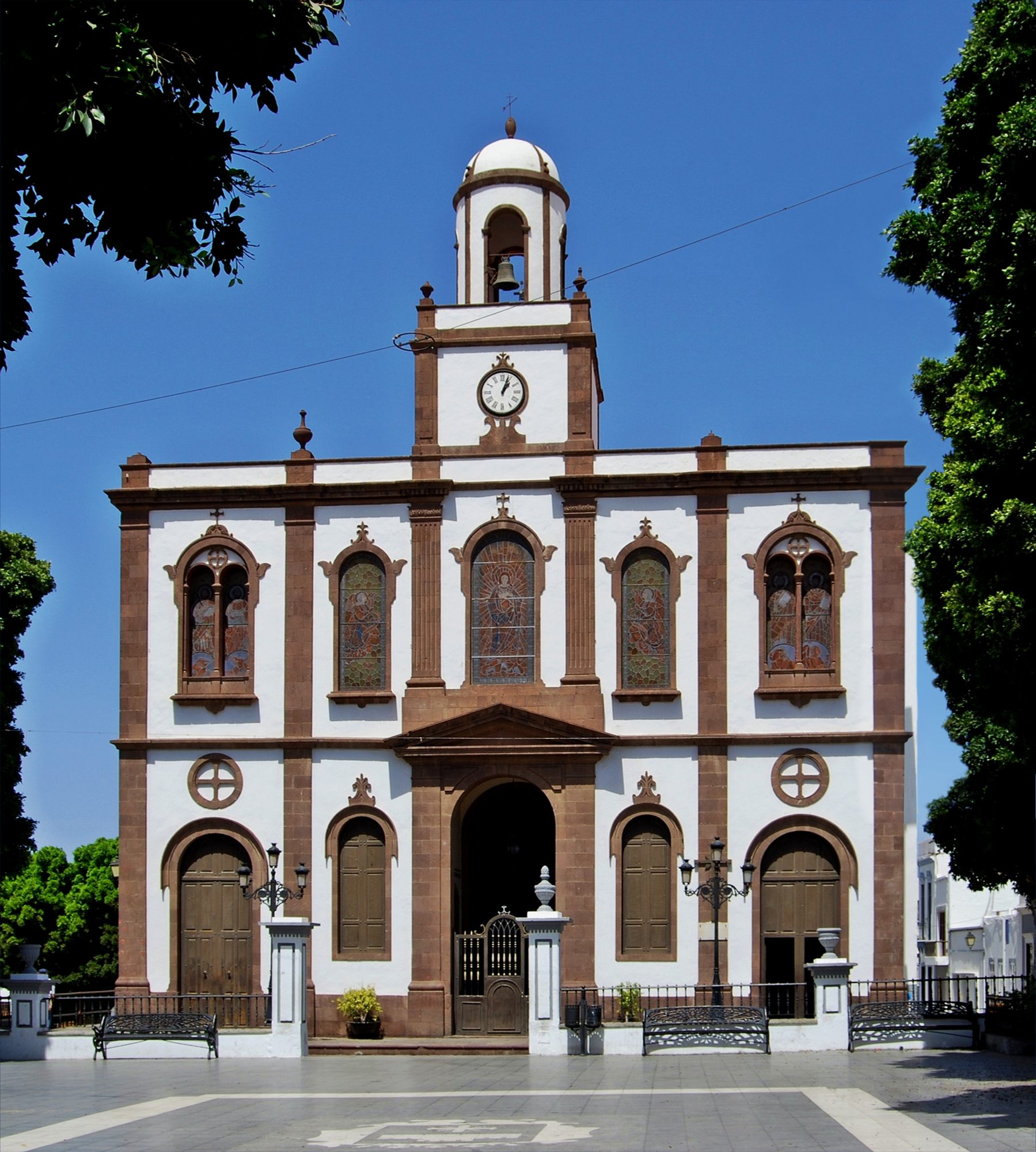
Church of Conception

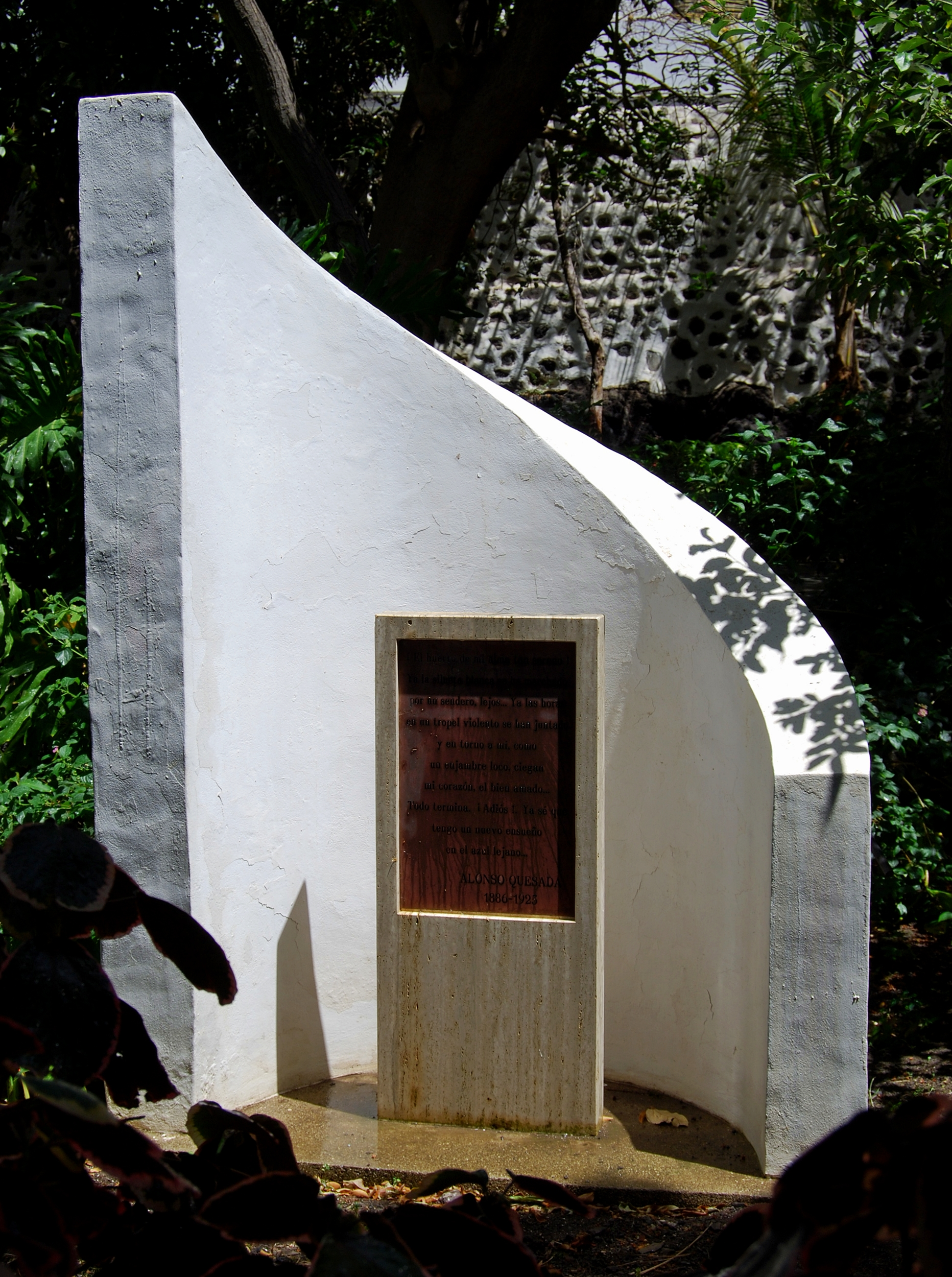
Monument Huerto de las Flores
(the Flowers Garden)

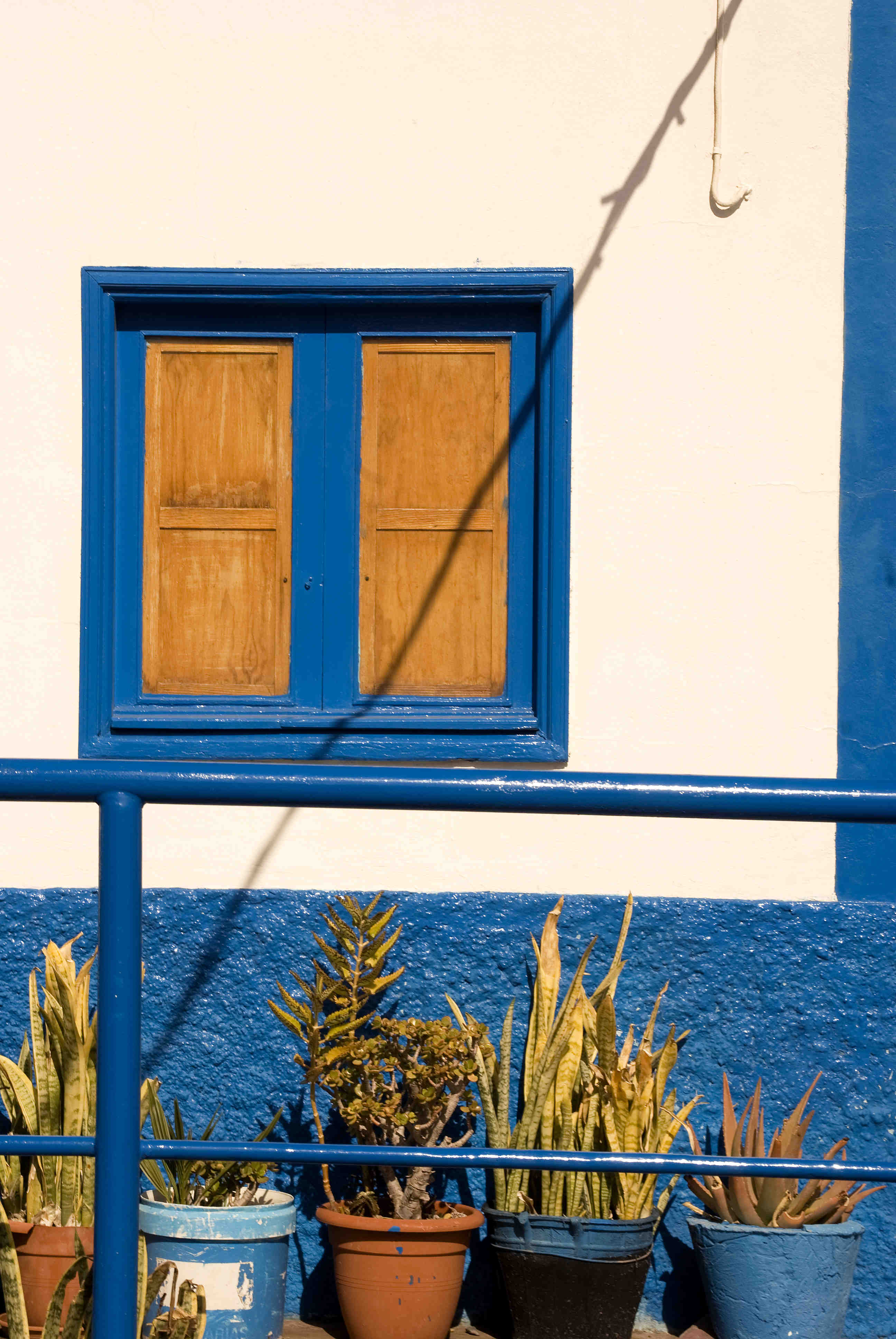
Colours in Agaete

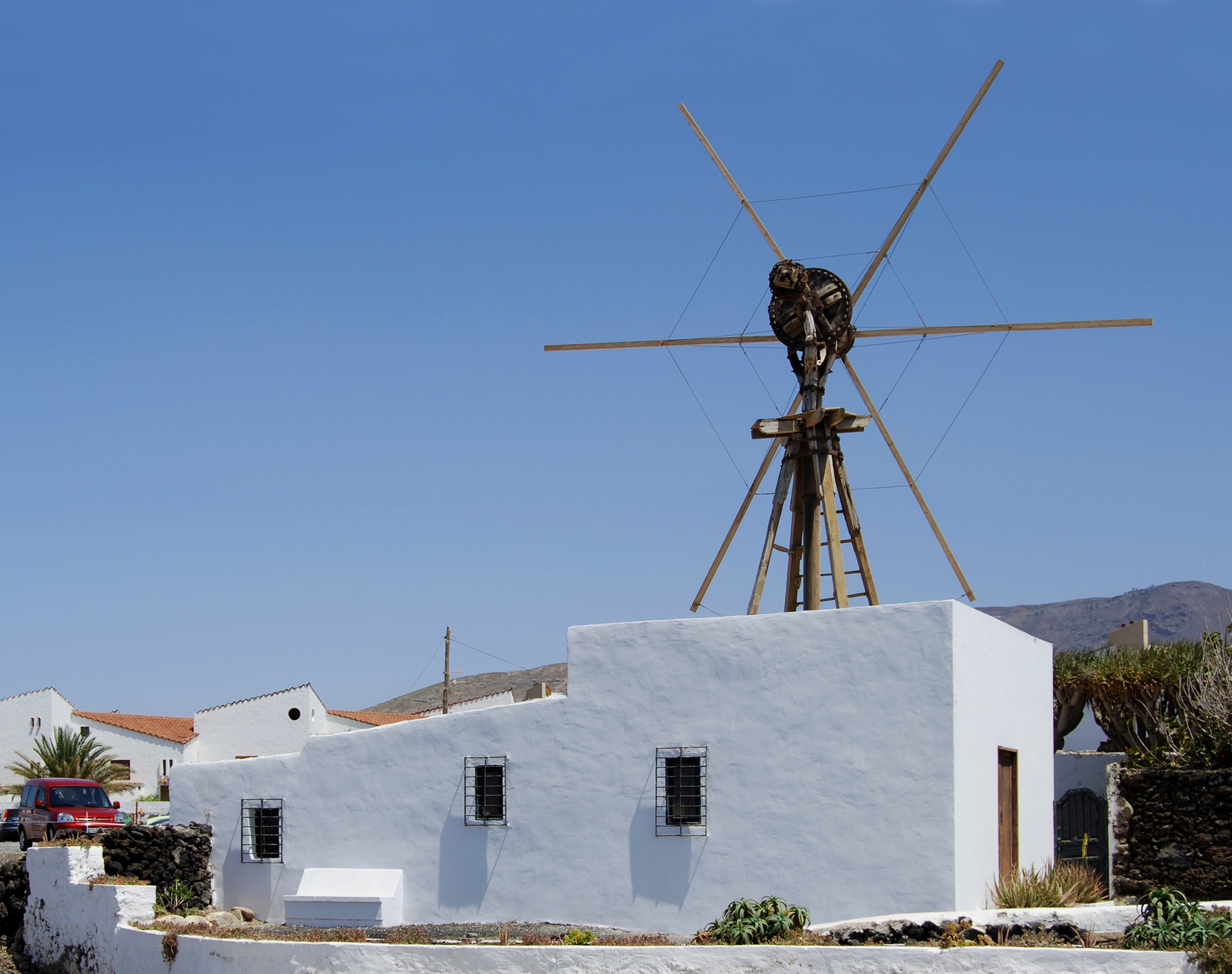
Windmill in Agaete

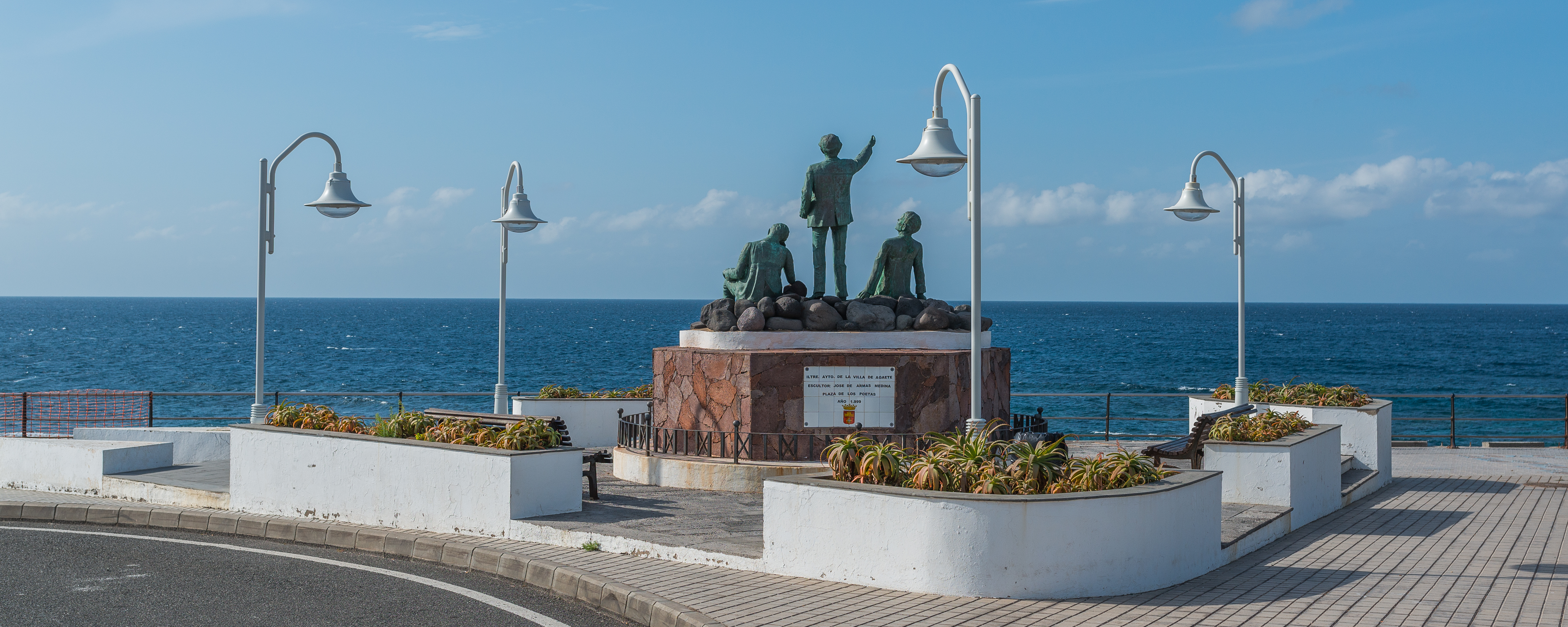
Statue of Los tres poetas in Puerto de las Nieves

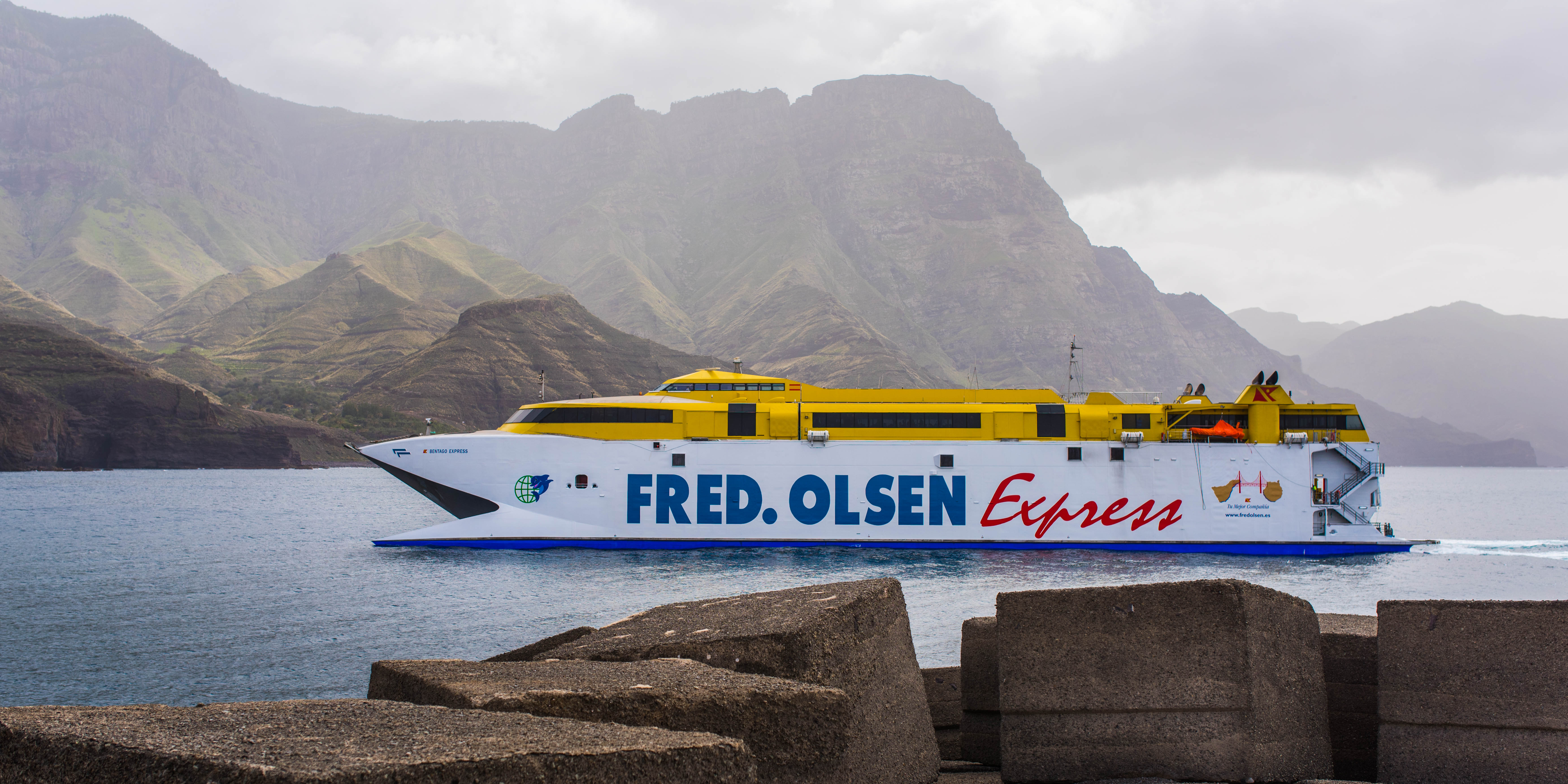
Ferry connections from Agaete to western Canary Islands

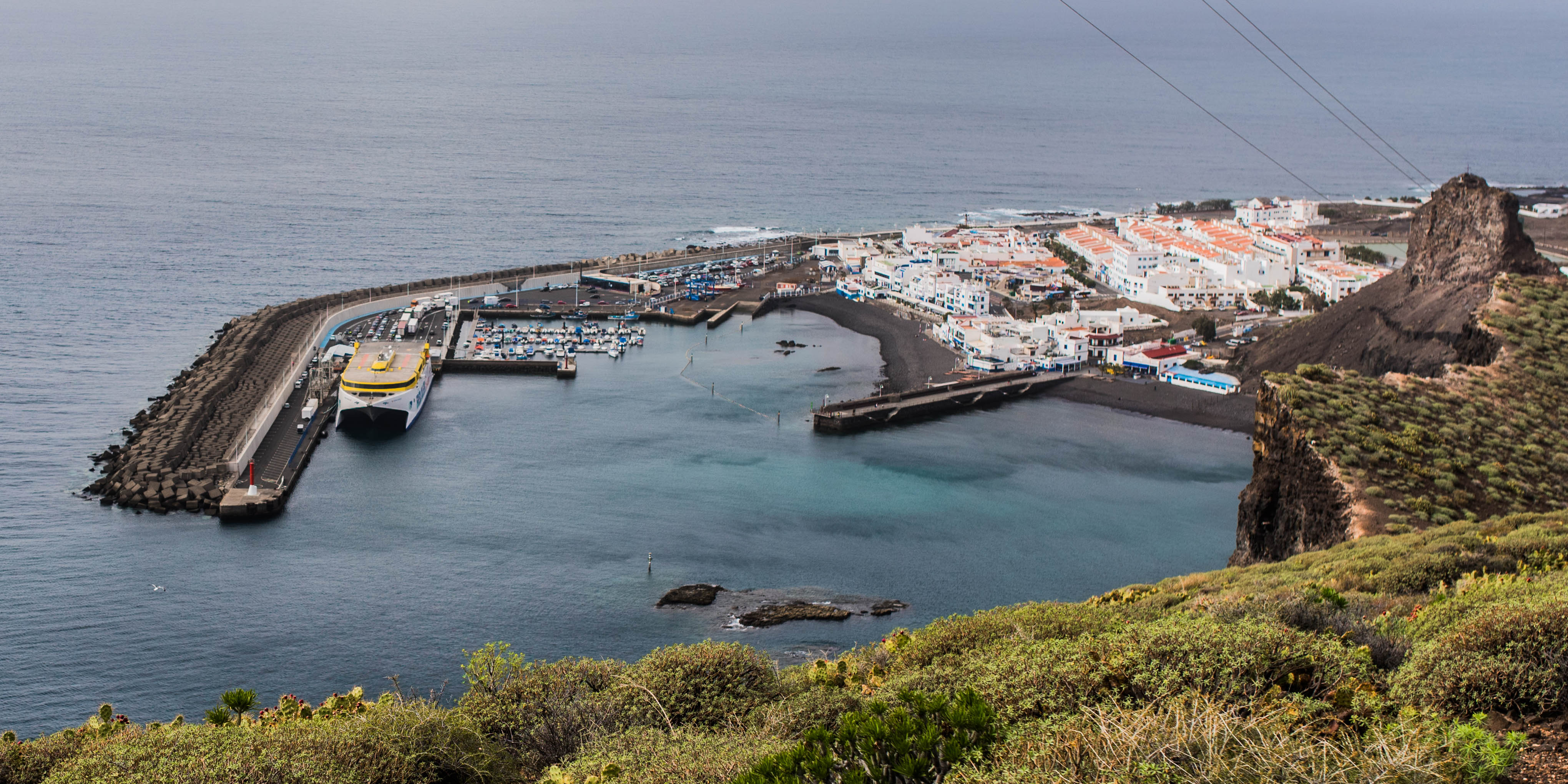
Puerto de las Nieves

West coast of Gran Canaria in Agaete seen from GC-200 road

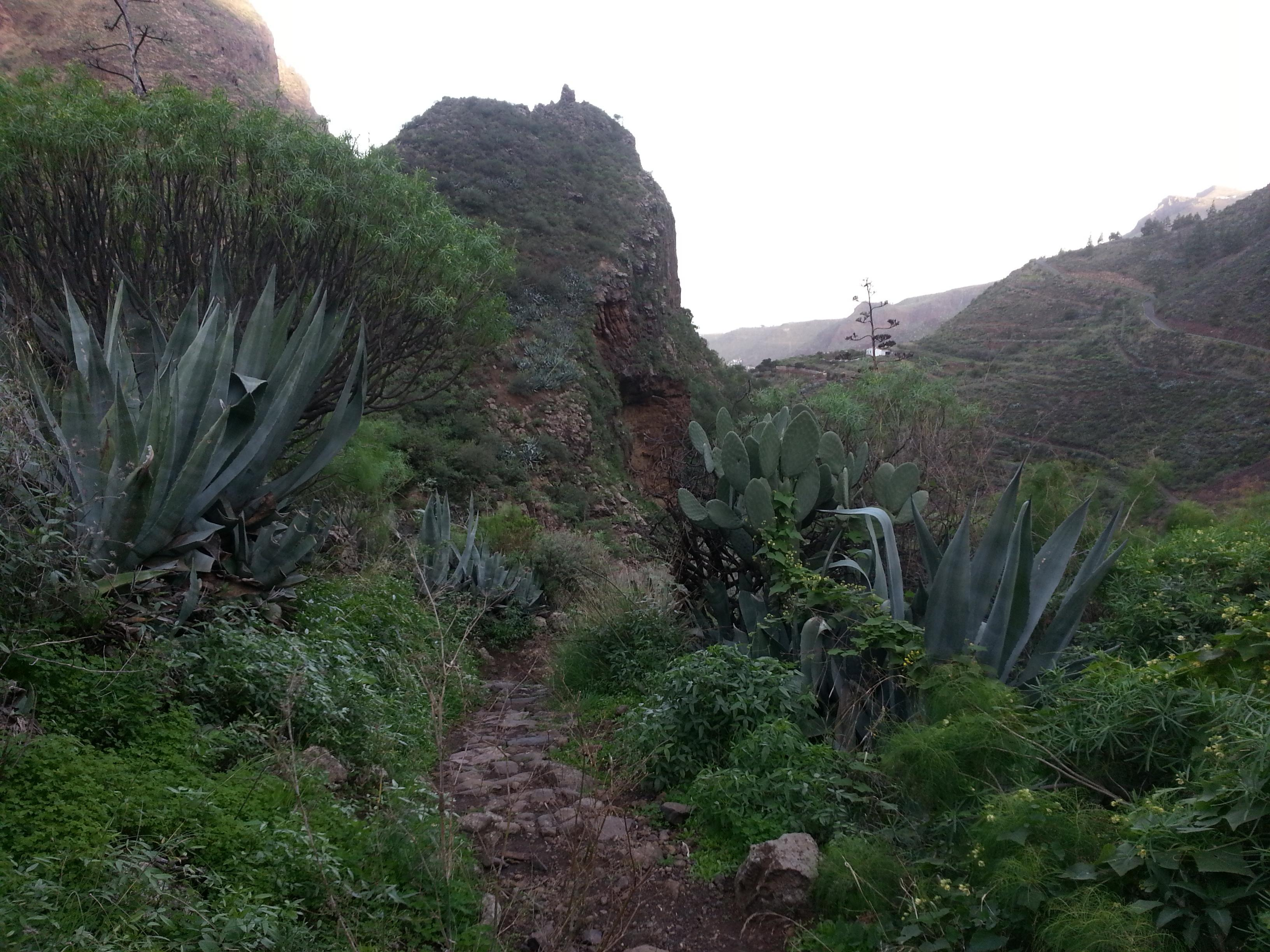
Barranco de Agaete

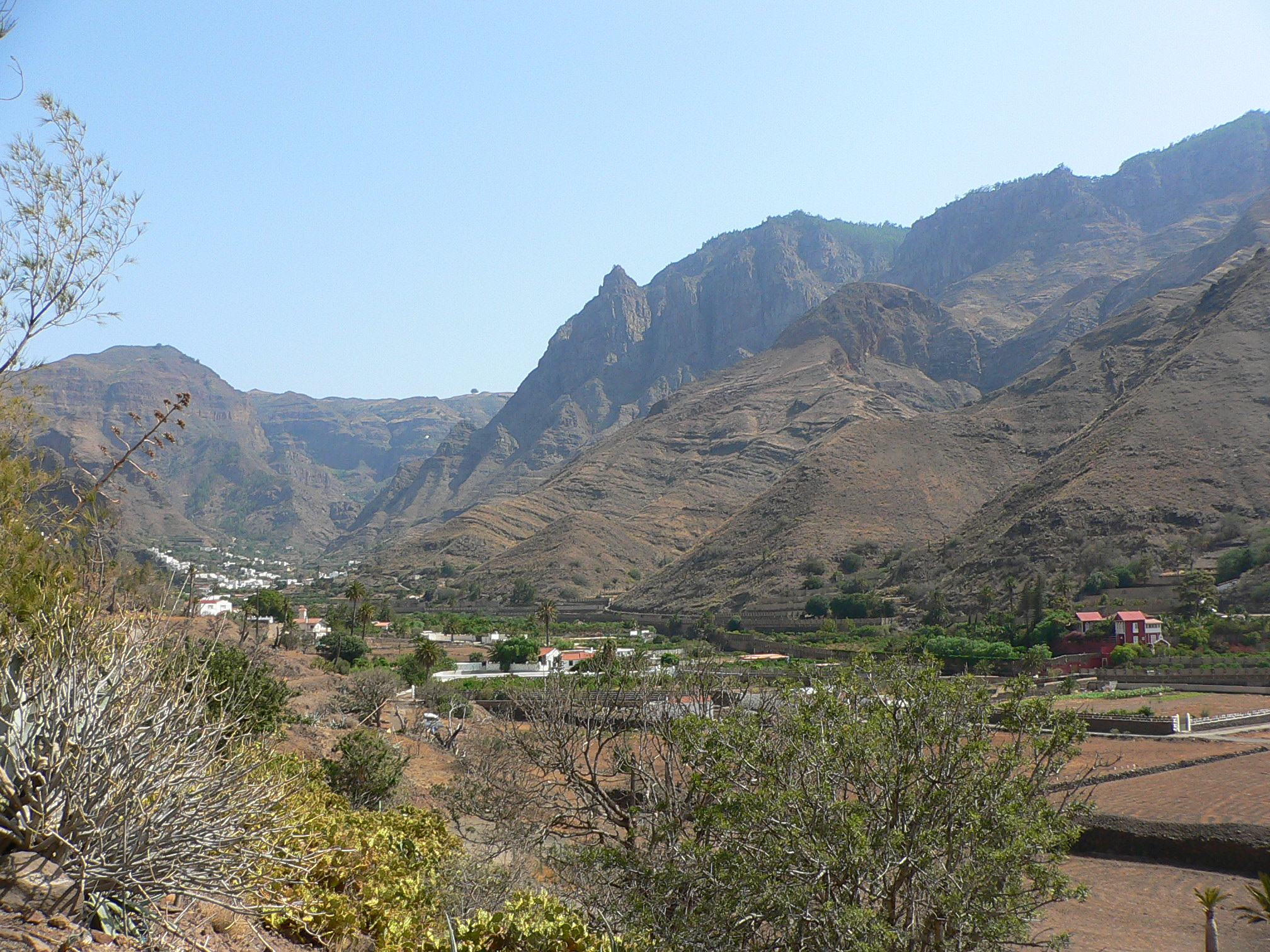
Agaete valley
(Valle de Agaete)

== See also ==
- List of municipalities in Las Palmas
