= Tropical Storm Delta (2005) =

Atlantic tropical storm in 2005

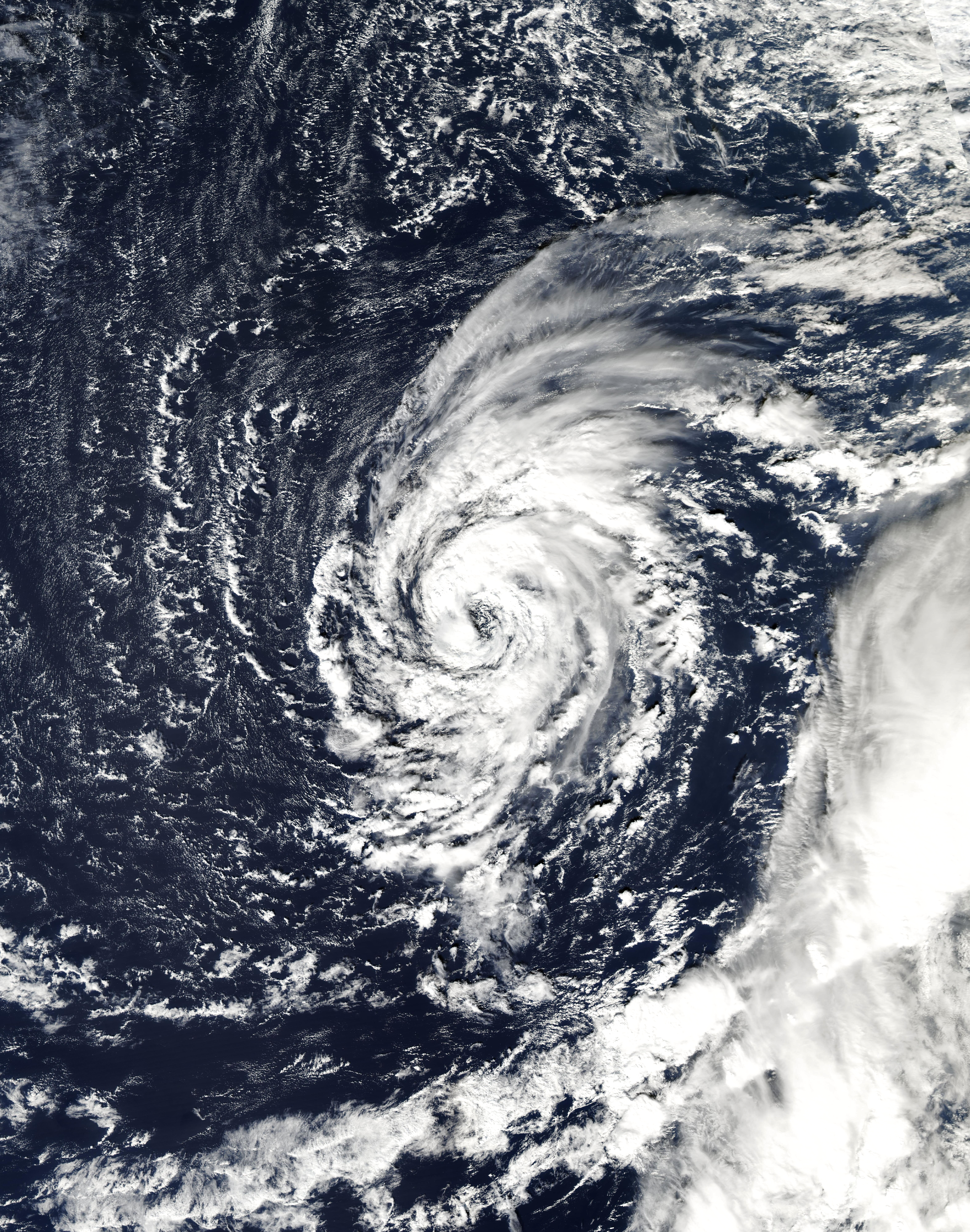
- Tropical Storm Delta at peak intensity on 24 November

Meteorological history
- Formed: 22 November 2005
- Extratropical: 28 November 2005
- Dissipated: 30 November 2005

Tropical storm
- 1-minute sustained (SSHWS/NWS)
- Highest winds: 70 mph (110 km/h)
- Lowest pressure: 980 mbar (hPa); 28.94 inHg

Overall effects
- Fatalities: 7 direct
- Missing: 12
- Damage: $364 million (2005 USD)
- Areas affected: Canary Islands, Morocco, Algeria, parts of North Africa, Mediterranean Sea
- IBTrACS
- Part of the 2005 Atlantic hurricane season

Tropical Storm Delta was a late-forming tropical storm during the extremely active 2005 Atlantic hurricane season which struck the Canary Islands as a strong extratropical storm where it caused significant damage. It then crossed over Morocco before dissipating. It was the 26th tropical or subtropical storm to form in the 28-storm 2005 season.

Tropical Storm Delta, like many late-season storms, developed out of an extratropical low. The storm gradually gained tropical characteristics and was briefly a subtropical storm on 22 November before transitioning to a tropical storm. Delta moved erratically for a few days before moving towards the Canary Islands. It became extratropical just before it passed to the north of the archipelago.

== Meteorological history ==
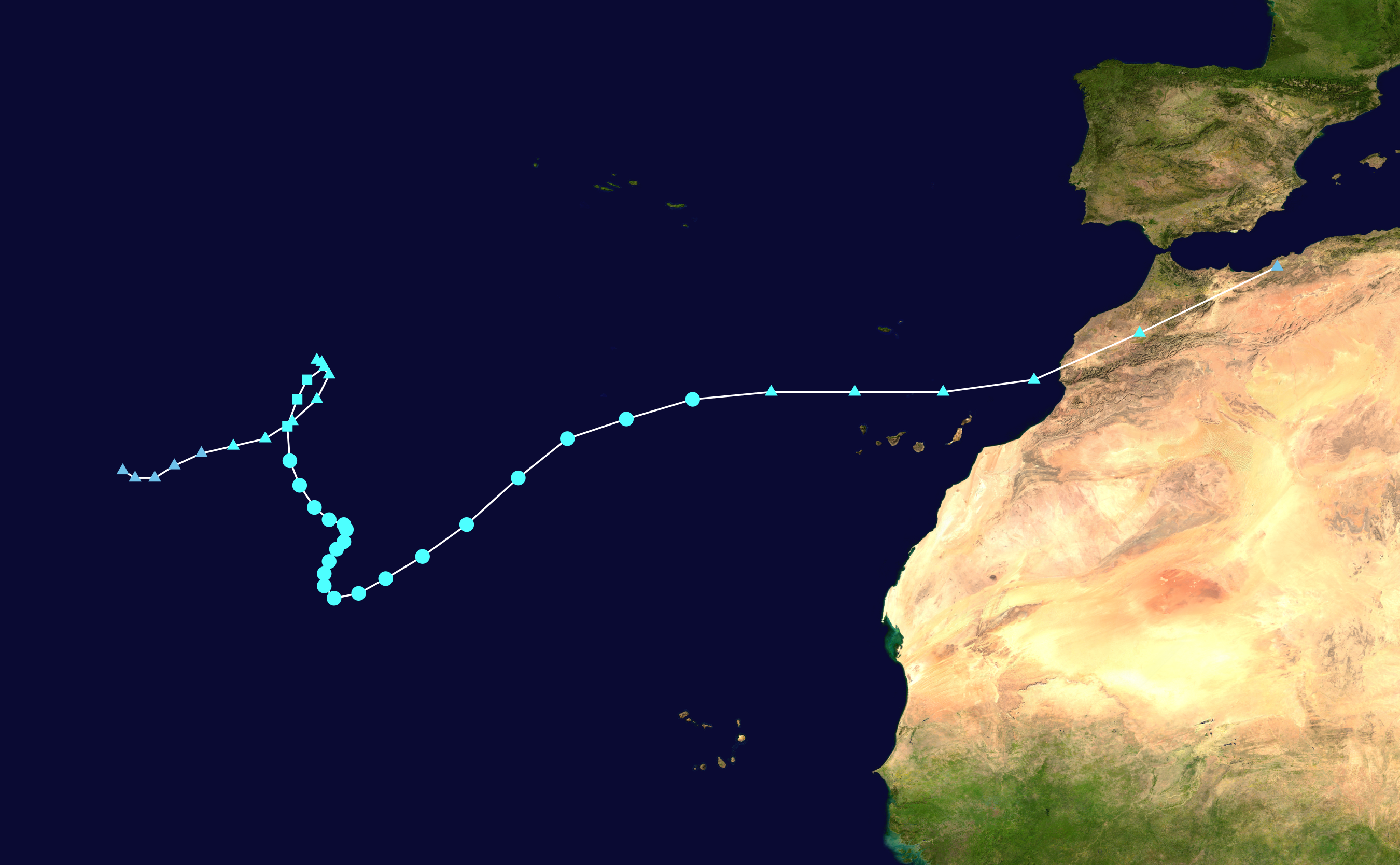
Map plotting the storm's track and intensity, according to the Saffir–Simpson scale Map key Saffir–Simpson scale Tropical depression (≤38 mph, ≤62 km/h) Tropical storm (39–73 mph, 63–118 km/h) Category 1 (74–95 mph, 119–153 km/h) Category 2 (96–110 mph, 154–177 km/h) Category 3 (111–129 mph, 178–208 km/h) Category 4 (130–156 mph, 209–251 km/h) Category 5 (≥157 mph, ≥252 km/h) Unknown Storm type Tropical cyclone Subtropical cyclone Extratropical cyclone, remnant low, tropical disturbance, or monsoon depression

On 19 November, a broad area of eastward-moving low pressure formed in the central Atlantic Ocean about 2,200 km (1,400 miles) southwest of the Azores. It moved steadily eastward through 20 November, but on 21 November, under the influence of a cold front to its north, the low turned northeastward and started to develop central convection. On 22 November, the non-tropical low pressure system began to gain some tropical characteristics, and its northward motion slowed to a stop. Late that afternoon, the low transitioned into a subtropical storm while stalled about 1,300 km (800 mi) west-southwest of the Azores. Operationally, the National Hurricane Center considered that the storm had already gained enough tropical characteristics to be classified as a tropical storm, but in post-storm analysis, this was reconsidered.

The storm's convection organized around a central core, and the system became a tropical storm on 23 November and received the name Delta. An eye-like feature appeared near the storm's circulatory center several times that day. The larger-scale deep-layered cyclonic circulation within which it was embedded steered it on a slow southward and then south-southwesterly track. Strong wind shear prevented immediate development and the system added an eastward component to its drift. Moving out of the high-shear environment on 24 November, Delta gained organization. Outflow and convective banding increased and an eye feature became well defined. This eye signaled the storm's peak strength of 110 km/h (70 mph), just below hurricane status. However, the official forecast at the time predicted Delta to strengthen further and become a minimal hurricane. Delta's motion stalled as it reached the southern base of a large cyclonic trough over the northern Atlantic within which it was embedded. Maintaining its intensity, Delta remained motionless for half a day until, that evening when it began a slow southward drift at 9.7 km/h (6 mph). Maintaining its intensity, Delta remained motionless for half a day Convection broke down in the storm's western semicircle early on 25 November; the decreased organization caused slight weakening. Maintaining its intensity, Delta remained motionless for half a day The southward motion slowed and the weakening trend continued into the evening. Cooling cold tops were counteracted by wind shear which exposed most of the low-level center. The storm moved southwestward on 25 November, then turned toward the southeast and east-northeast the following day. During these maneuvers, Delta grew weaker due to strong wind shear, with its winds decreasing to an estimated 65 km/h (40 mph).

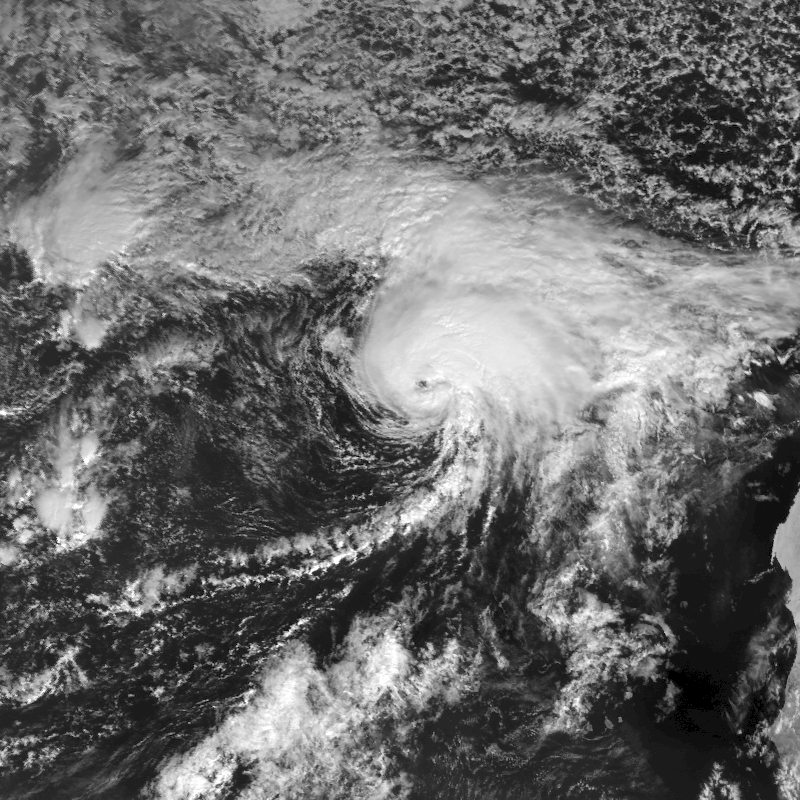
Tropical Storm Delta approaching the Canary Islands on 27 November

Delta then accelerated to the northeast on 27 November, towards the Canary Islands. As it did, the system intensified again, reaching a second peak of just under hurricane strength. In post-storm analysis, the NHC noted that there was a possibility that Delta had briefly reached hurricane strength that day; however, the data was not conclusive enough to justify an upgrade to hurricane status. On 28 November, as it neared the Canary Islands Tropical Storm Delta lost its tropical characteristics. The extratropical storm, which maintained winds of near-hurricane strength, passed about 169 km (105 mi) north of the islands that night. The storm moved over Morocco early on 29 November and rapidly weakened overland, dissipating late that day over northwestern Algeria.

== Preparations and impact ==
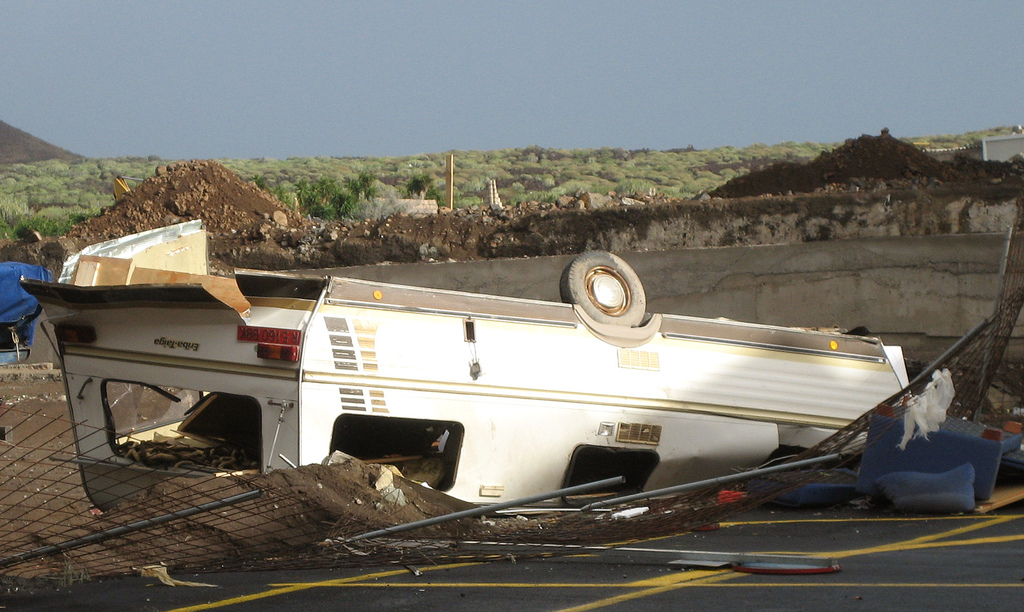
Storm damage from Delta on Tenerife

Tropical Storm Delta's arrival in the Canary Islands was described as a "historic" event. Tropical cyclones there are extremely rare and the islands had no tropical warning systems in place. The government issued a general emergency advisory and advised citizens to stay indoors. Tenerife North Airport was closed, stranding hundreds of passengers for the duration of the storm. The Education Board of the Canary Islands Government suspended Tuesday classes for all non-university schools for 320,000 students. The shipping company Fred Olsen suspended services linking the islands of Tenerife and La Palma and La Gomera. On the island of El Hierro the exposed road to Sabinosa Health Center was closed as a precaution.

Delta caused considerable damage in the Canary Islands. The storm claimed nineteen lives and caused a total of €312 million ($364 million 2005 US dollars) damage throughout the archipelago. Eighteen died when a boat sank off the Canary Islands; twelve of the bodies were never found. The nineteenth man was killed when while trying to repair his roof during the storm; winds threw him from his ladder. The islands of Tenerife and La Palma were hardest hit, with many uprooted trees and landslides reported. The peak gust recorded at La Palma was 152 km/h (94 mph), and at North Tenerife the maximum gust was 147 km/h (91 mph). Some patients at Tenerife's University Hospital were evacuated to a safer part of the building when paneling from the hospital's heliport was torn free and smashed some of the building's windows. Off Santa Cruz's southern quay a tug boat broke its ties, collided with another vessel, and sank. Passengers at Tenerife North Airport, who were stranded when their flights canceled, witnessed parts of the new international terminal's roof tear off in the wind. In La Palma a falling palm tree, trunk snapped by the wind, injured the leg of a German tourist. Many palm trees along the Avenida Marítima were also blown down. The storms winds blew out windows and collapsed cornices, although other structural damage was minimal. Metal plates that had been used to board up buildings were strewn all over the island.

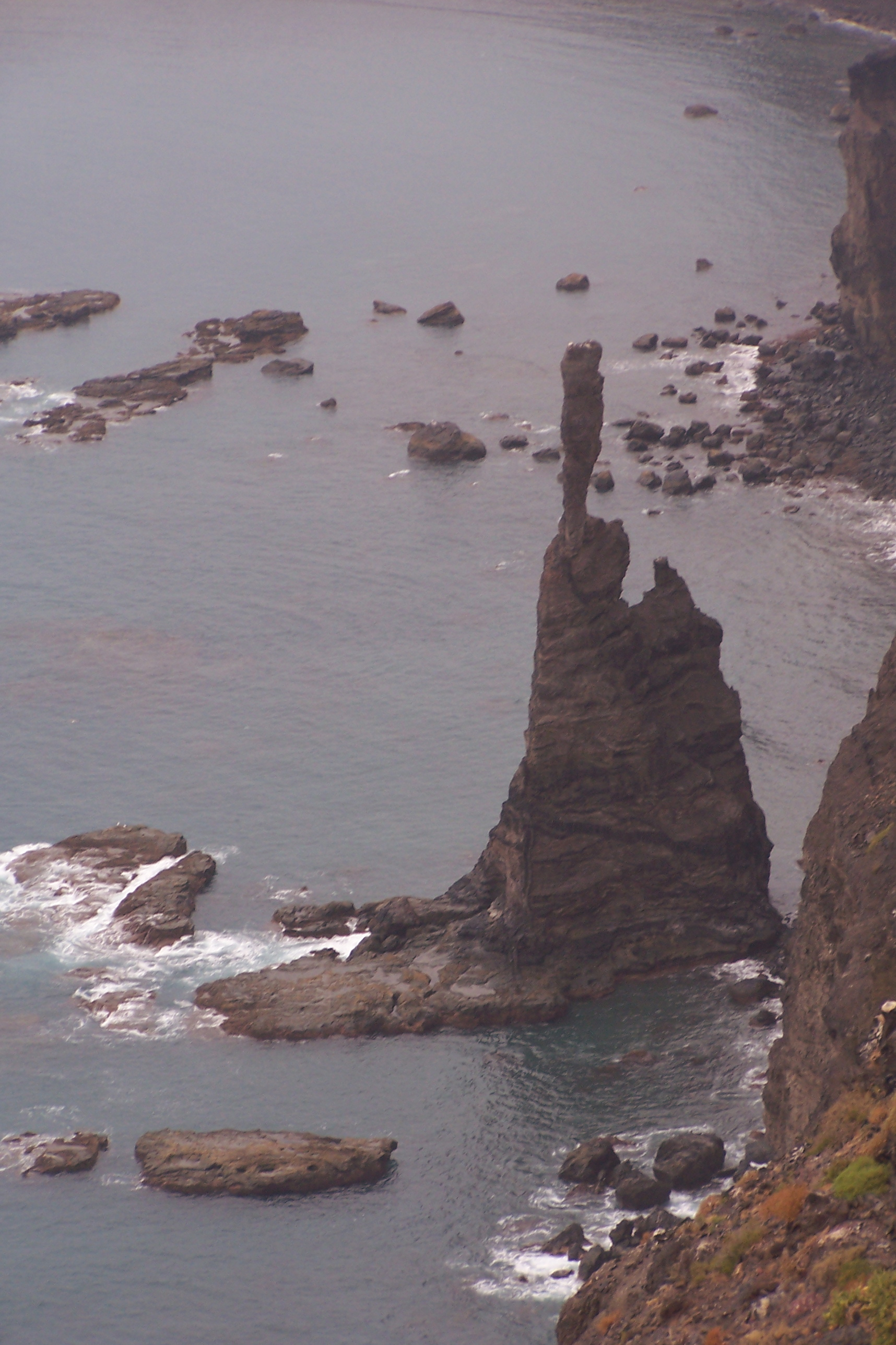

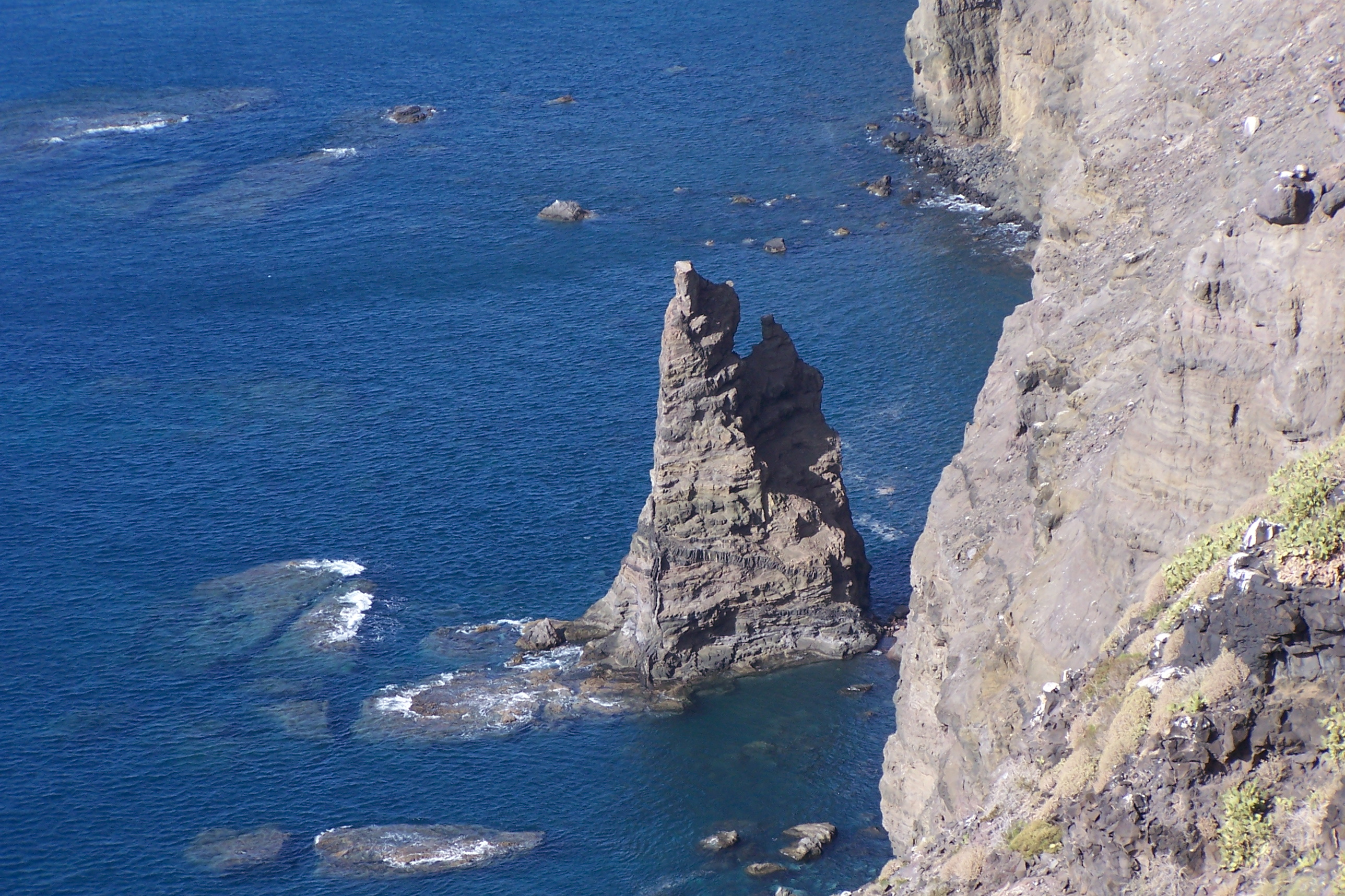
El Dedo de Dios before (top) and after (bottom) Tropical Storm Delta, showing the destruction of the upper portion of the formation.

Over 225,000 residents lost electricity and 12,000 lost telephone service. Some vandalism and looting was reported during the loss of power, and the police made several arrests during the night. For over 24 hours roads were closed on the islands of El Hierro, Tenerife and La Palma: the first two due to landslides and the third by the collapse of an old house and a massive tree. One of the most famous geological features of the island of Gran Canaria, El Dedo de Dios (or God's finger), which had been pointing towards the sky for over a millennium, was destroyed by Delta's wind and wave action along Gran Canaria's shore. Upon hearing of the destruction of the natural monument, one man, later found to be clinically insane, unsuccessfully tried to kill himself and then stabbed three members of his own family.

When the remnants of Delta arrived in Morocco they were described as a "normal atmospheric disturbance". No damage was reported there and in fact the system was welcomed by farmers who needed the rain to complete the sowing of cereal crops.

== Aftermath ==
With the Canary Islands' power grid substantially disrupted, the Unelco-Endesa power company was forced to use temporary generators to boost power at sub-stations far from the main grid. In La Corujera in Santa Úrsula, these generators were poorly received and over 1,000 local residents claimed to be affected by the noise and pollution. Children, the elderly and people with respiratory problems suffered most acutely. Roughly €25 million (US$37.25 million) was allocated by the government of the Canary Islands in relief and reconstruction funds. Of this total, €22.5 million (US$33.5 million) was used to repair infrastructure and utilities; €1.5 million (US$2.2 million) was used for agricultural relief; and €1 million (US$1.5 million) was used in home repairs. Due to the severity of crop losses, farmers would be given a grant from the government that would cover 50% of their losses, including infrastructural. A tax break was also given to most residents who suffered damage from Delta.

Fishermen of the Canary Islands had to return to and remain in port for several days while weathering the storm, and this disruption was blamed for a 10–15% reduction of the islands' tuna catch. Tropical Storm Delta also had some further-reaching effects. The political opposition Popular Party challenged that the impact of Tropical Storm Delta proved the need for the island to prepare an emergency plan to deal with natural and man-made disasters. Only five of the island's many municipalities had an emergency plan, and there was no coordination across the entire island chain. Delta also served to highlight the islands' aging power grid, prompting the regional director general of industry and energy to consider building another power plant on the archipelago. The storm sparked a vigorous debate on the island about the effects of global climate change, how they will affect the islands, and how these effects can be avoided.

== Record ==
Delta established a record formation date for the season's 26th tropical or subtropical storm. This mark stood until 2020, when Hurricane Epsilon formed on 19 October.

== See also ==
- Tropical cyclones in 2005
- Timeline of the 2005 Atlantic hurricane season
- Tropical Storm Hermine (2022) - next tropical cyclone to significantly affect the Canary Islands
