= Wasigny–Mézières railway =

Railway line in France

Coordinates: 49.62361°N 4.34826°E

Wasigny–Mézières
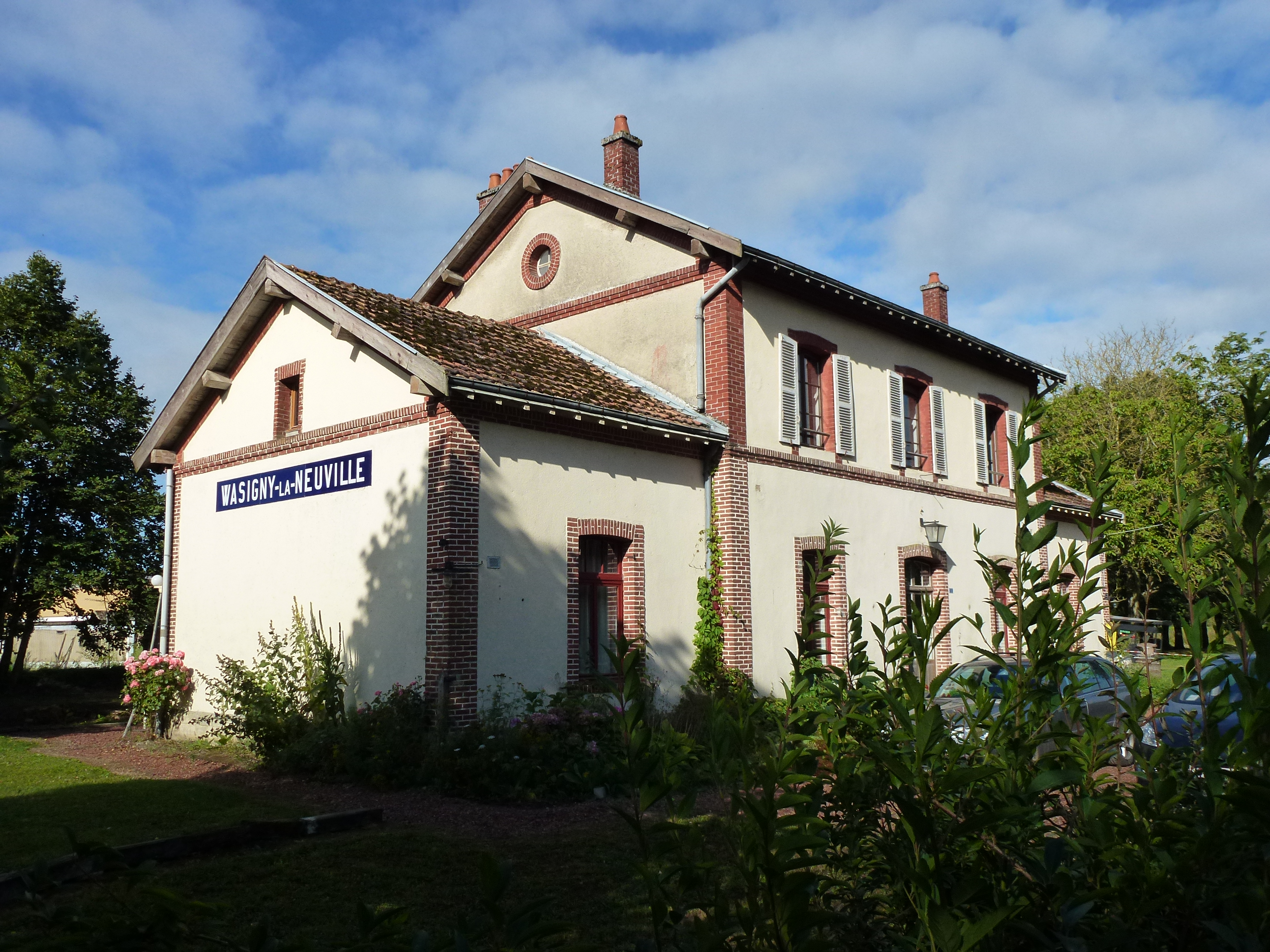
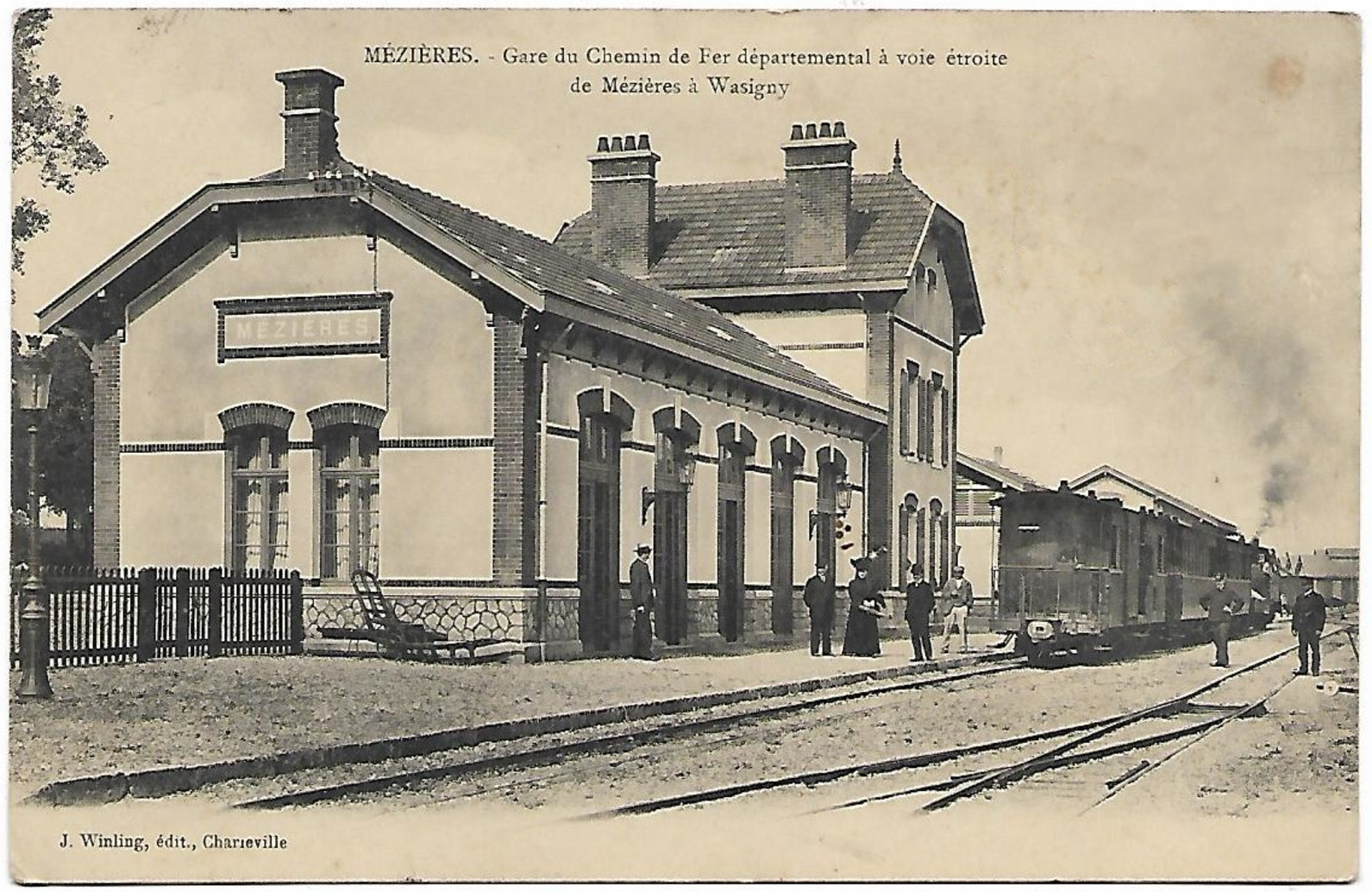
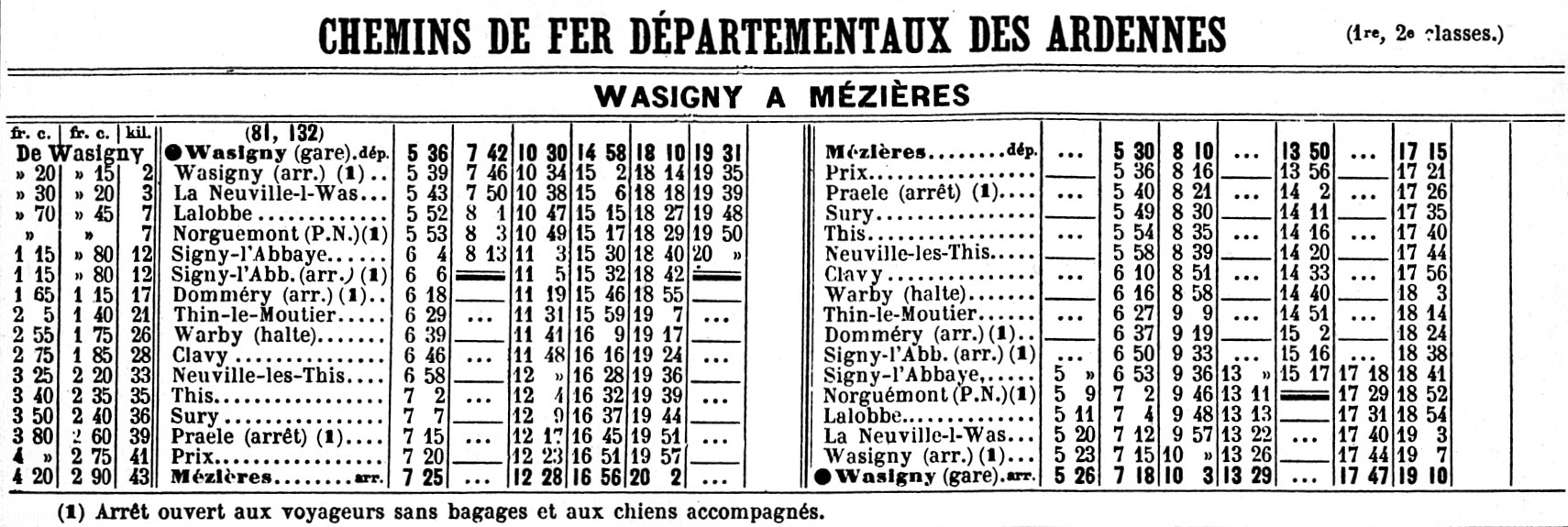
- Wasigny-La Neuville station Mézières Time table, May 1914

Technical
- Line length: 43 km (27 mi)
- Track gauge: Until 1908: 800 mm (2 ft 7 1/2 in); After 1908: 1,000 mm (3 ft 3 3/8 in)

The Wasigny–Mézières railway was a 43 kilometres (27 miles) long narrow gauge and metre gauge railway line in the north of France, which was put into service in sections from 1897 and operated until 1948.

== Route ==
The secondary railway line of the Chemins de fer départementaux des Ardennes ran from Wasigny via Signy-l'Abbaye to Mézières in walking distance to the Mohon^{(fr)} und Charleville-Mézières stations.

== History ==
The Wasigny–Signy section was opened in 1897 as a narrow-gauge railway with the unusual gauge of 800 mm for military reasons, and was only converted to metre gauge when the metre-gauge Signy–Mézières section was built, which opened in 1908. The railway operated until 1948.

== Stations ==
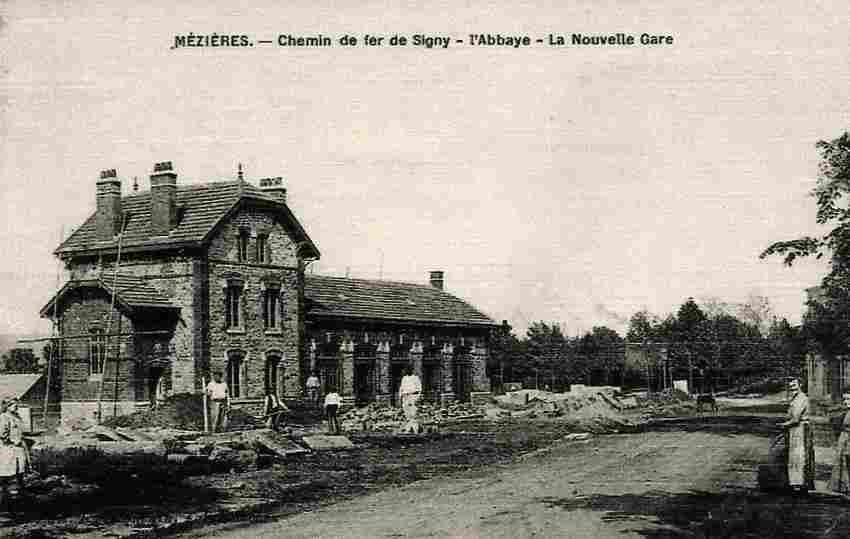
Signy-l’Abbaye

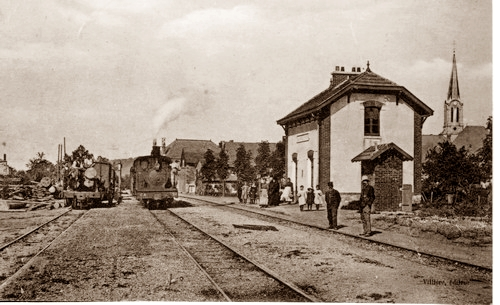
Thin-le-Moutier

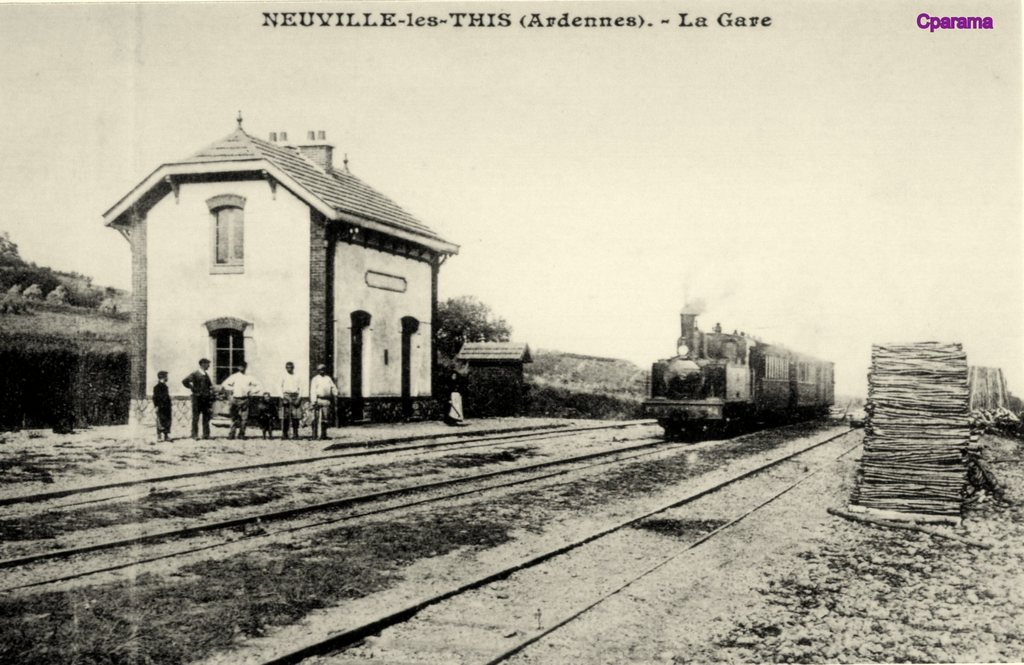
Neuville-lès-This
