= Paul Rivet =

French ethnologist

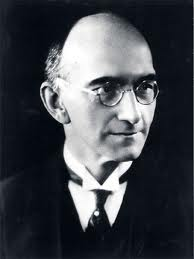
- Paul Rivet in 1938
- Born: 7 May 1876; Wasigny, Ardennes, France
- Died: 21 March 1958 (aged 81); Paris, France
- Known for: Musée de l'Homme; Comité de vigilance des intellectuels antifascistes
- Spouse: Mercedes Andrade Chiriboga
- Scientific career
- Fields: Ethnology

Paul Rivet (French: [pɔl ʁivɛ]; 7 May 1876 – 21 March 1958) was a French ethnologist known for founding the Musée de l'Homme in 1937. In his professional work, Rivet is known for his theory that South America was originally populated in part by migrants who sailed there from Australia and Melanesia. He married Mercedes Andrade Chiriboga, who was from Cuenca, Ecuador.

== Early life and education ==
Paul Rivet was born in Wasigny, Ardennes, in 1876. He attended local schools and university, studying to be a physician.

== Career ==
Trained as a physician, in 1901 he took part in the Second French Geodesic Mission for survey measurements of the length of a meridian arc to Ecuador. He remained for five years in South America, where he was mentored by Federico González Suárez, an Ecuadorian bishop, historian and archaeologist. Rivet became interested in the indigenous peoples, beginning an ethnographic study of the Huaorani people of the Ecuadorian Amazon, then known as the Jívaro. While in Ecuador he collected specimens of amphibians and reptiles. Returning to France, Rivet went to work with the Muséum national d'histoire naturelle, directed by René Verneau.

He published several papers on his Ecuadorian research, before publishing an extended volume co-authored with René Verneau, titled Ancient Ethnography of Ecuador (1921-1922). In 1926, Rivet participated in founding the Institut d'ethnologie in Paris, together with Marcel Mauss and Lucien Lévy-Bruhl. They intended it as a collaboration among the fields of philosophy, ethnology and sociology. He taught many French ethnologists, including George Devereux. In 1928, he succeeded René Verneau as director of the National Museum of Natural History.

He continued to develop institutions for the study of mankind. In 1937, he founded the Musée de l'Homme in Paris, which became renowned for its ethnographic research and collections.

In 1942, following Nazi occupation of Paris, Rivet was ousted from his position at the museum. He went to the US where Franz Boas tried to help him along with other academicians displaced by the Nazis. On knowing that the Germans were failing to scientifically prove racial difference and superiority, Boas said, "We should never stop repeating the idea that racism is a monstrous error and an imprudent lie." This exchange took place at a luncheon organised by Boas at the Columbia Faculty Club in honor of Rivet. Beginning his stint in Columbia University from 1942, Rivet founded the Anthropological Institute and Museum.

Returning to Paris in 1945, he continued teaching while carrying on his research. His linguistic research introduced several new perspectives on the Aymara and Quechua languages of South America.

=== Politics ===
Rivet also became involved in politics, alarmed at the rise of fascism in Europe during the 1930s. During the 6 February 1934 crisis, he was one of the founders of the Comité de vigilance des intellectuels antifascistes, an antifascist organization created in the wake of massive riots in Paris. Rivet was a leader in the French Resistance to Nazi occupation. He narrowly escaped arrest and execution by the Nazis. Several of his colleagues, including Anatole Lewitsky and Boris Vilde were shot.

== Linguistic classification ==
Rivet is well known for his classification of South American languages. He proposed 77 language families and about 1240 languages and dialects. Much of his work on language classification was later incorporated by John Alden Mason and his former student Čestmír Loukotka.

== Migration theory ==
Rivet's theory asserts that Asia was the origin of the Indigenous people of the Americas. However, he also suggested that migrations to South America were made from Australia some 6,000 years before, and from Melanesia somewhat later. Les Origines de l'Homme Américain ("The Origins of the American Man") was published in 1943, and contains linguistic and anthropological arguments to support his thesis.

== Honors ==
Rivet is commemorated in the scientific names of the South American snake Leptophis riveti and frog Pristimantis riveti. He was awarded the Latvian Order of the Three Stars 3rd Class on 15 November 1935.

== Books ==
- with René Verneau, 1921-1922. Ancient Ethnography of Ecuador.
- 1923. L'orfèvrerie du Chiriquí et de Colombie. Paris: Société des Américanistes de Paris.
- 1923. L'orfèvrerie précolombienne des Antilles, des Guyanes, et du Vénézuéla, dans ses rapports avec l'orfèvrerie et la métallurgie des autres régions américaines. Paris: Au siège de la société des Américanistes de Paris.
- 1943. Los origenes del hombre Americano. México: Cuadernos amerícanos.
- 1960. Maya cities: Ancient cities and temples. London: Elek Books.
- with Freund, Gisèle, 1954. Mexique précolombien. Neuchâtel: Éditions Ides et calendes.

== Sources ==
- "Paul Rivet", Encyclopædia Britannica
- Alarcón, Arturo G. 2006. Paul Rivet Y La Teoría Oceánica.
- D’Harcourt, Raoul. 1958. "Paul Rivet," American Anthropologist 60(4), 1180-1181
- Rodriguez, Antonio O. 2003. Paul Rivet: Estudioso Del Hombre Americano, Panamericana Editorial. ISBN 9583005266
- Spinney, Laura. 2020. "Defying the Nazis" Smithsonian Magazine, June, pages 10, 12-14.
