= Lycée Français René-Verneau =

- Liceo Francés de Gran Canaria
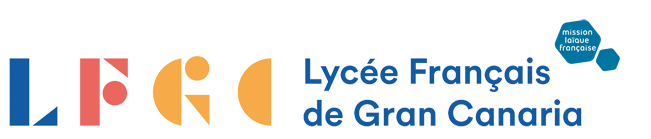

Location
- Carretera de Taliarte, s/n 35214 Gran Canaria; Spain
- Coordinates: 27.991618°N 15.370957°W

Information
- Type: French International school
- Motto: Two cultures, three languages
- Established: 1974
- Principal: Loïc Chatton
- Grades: From Preschool to 12th Grade
- Enrollment: 408 (2017/2018)
- Language: French, Spanish, English
- Affiliation: Mission laïque française (since 1986)
- Information: Mlf School
- Exam Preparation: French national diploma, Baccalauréat, BachiBac
- Languages taught: French, Spanish, English
- Language Certifications: English (Cambridge English), Spanish (DELE), French (DELF)
- Website: lfgrancanaria.com

The Lycée Français René-Verneau de Gran Canaria (Spanish: Liceo Francés de Gran Canaria) is a French international school in Telde, Gran Canaria, Spain. It was established in 1974 and has integrated the Mission laïque française (Mlf) in 1986. It serves levels maternelle (preschool) through terminale, the final year of lycée (senior high school) and it allows French, English and Spanish languages learning from preschool for all children. As of 2017 the school has about 400 students range from 3 to 18 years.

== See also ==
- Agency for French Education Abroad
- Education in France
- List of international schools
- Mission laïque française
- Multilingualism
- René Verneau
