= Telde =

Town in the Canary Islands

- Municipality
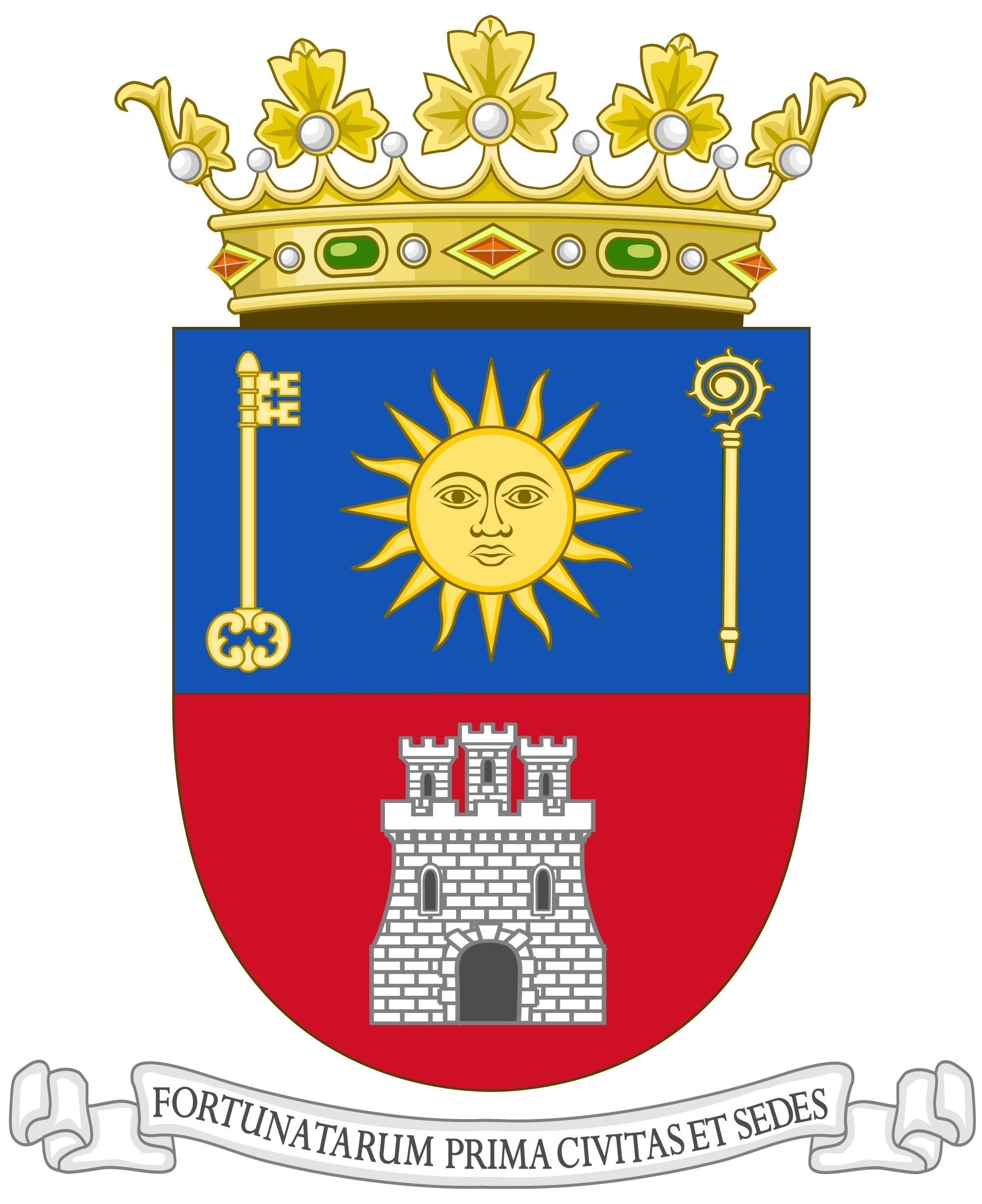
- Flag Coat of arms
- Location of Telde
- Location within Gran Canaria
- Coordinates: 27°59′N 15°25′W
- Country: Spain
- Autonomous Community: Canary Islands
- Province: Las Palmas
- Island: Gran Canaria

Government
  - Mayor: Juan Antonio Peña (CIUCA)

Area
  - Total: 102.43 km^{2} (39.55 sq mi)
- Elevation: 130 m (430 ft)

Population (2025-01-01)
  - Total: 104,168
  - Density: 1,017.0/km^{2} (2,633.9/sq mi)
- Demonym: Teldenses
- Time zone: UTC±0 (WET)
  - Summer (DST): UTC+1 (WEST)
- Postal code: 35200
- Dialing code: +34 928
- Official language(s): Spanish

Telde is a municipality in the eastern part of the island of Gran Canaria, Canary Islands, overseas (Atlantic) insular Spain. It borders Las Palmas to the north and is part of its urban area. It is historically known as the "City of the Faycanes" (ancient aboriginal high priests).

It is the second most populous municipality on the island of Gran Canaria. Its area is 102.43 km^{2} (39.55 sq mi). Telde is the oldest city on the island and served as its first capital. Originally established as an ancient aboriginal center, it became a medieval bishopric via papal decree in 1351, was officially re-founded under Spanish colonial rule in 1483, and survives today as a Catholic titular see. The GC-1 motorway passes east of the city. Gran Canaria International Airport is located in the subdivision of Gando, south of Telde.

== History ==
Before the Spanish invasion, Telde was the eastern center of the aborigines of the island, and the renowned aborigine Doramas is believed to have lived here. Early records point to about 14,000 aboriginal dwellings in Telde at the time of conquest; Telde is the spot where the famous Idolo de Tara figure—currently housed in the Museo Canario in Las Palmas—was discovered.

Following the Spanish conquest of the island, the colonial town was officially founded in 1483 by Cristóbal García del Castillo. Today, the historic old town area of Telde remains a popular destination for visitors.

== Ecclesiastical History ==
The Diocese of Islas de la Fortuna (español) / Isola de Fortunate (Italiano) / Insulas Fortunatis (Latin) (meaning 'Fortunate islands', the nickname of the Canaries) was established on 7 November 1351. The territory split off from the Balearic Diocese of Mallorca, as suffragan of the (Andalusian) Metropolitan Archdiocese of Seville.

Renamed in 1369 after its see as Diocese of Telde (Spanish) / Telden(sis) (Latin adjective).

On 7 July 1404 it lost territory to establish the Diocese of Rubicon.

In 1441 it was suppressed, without direct successor.

=== Residential Ordinaries ===
Suffragan Bishops of Islas de la Fortuna

- Bernardo Font, Carmelite Order (O. Carm.) (1351.11.07 – 1354), next Bishop of Santa Giusta (1354–?)
- Bartolomé, Dominican Order (O.P.) (1361.03.02 – 1362)

Suffragan Bishops of Telde

- Bonanat Tarí, Friars Minor (O.F.M.) (1369.07.02 – 1392)
- Jaime Olzina, O.P. (1392.01.31 – 1441)

=== Titular see ===
In 1969 the diocese was nominally restored as Latin Titular bishopric of Telde (Spanish) / Telden(sis) (Latin adjective).

It has had the following incumbents, none yet of the fitting Episcopal (lowest) rank:

- Titular Archbishop: William Aquin Carew (1969.11.27 – 2012.05.08) as papal diplomat : Apostolic Nuncio (ambassador) to Burundi (1969.11.27 – 1974.05.10), Apostolic Nuncio to Rwanda (1969.11.27 – 1974.05.10), Apostolic Pro-Nuncio to Cyprus (1974.05.10 – 1983.08.30), Apostolic Delegate to Jerusalem and Palestine (1974.05.10 – 1983.08.30), Apostolic Pro-Nuncio to Japan (1983.08.30 – retired 1997.11.11); died 2012
- Titular Archbishop Giampiero Gloder (2013.09.21 – ...), President of Pontifical Ecclesiastical Academy, Vice-Chamberlain of the Holy Roman Church of Apostolic Camera; previously Head of Office for special affairs of Secretariat of State (2005 – 2013.09.21).

== Economy ==
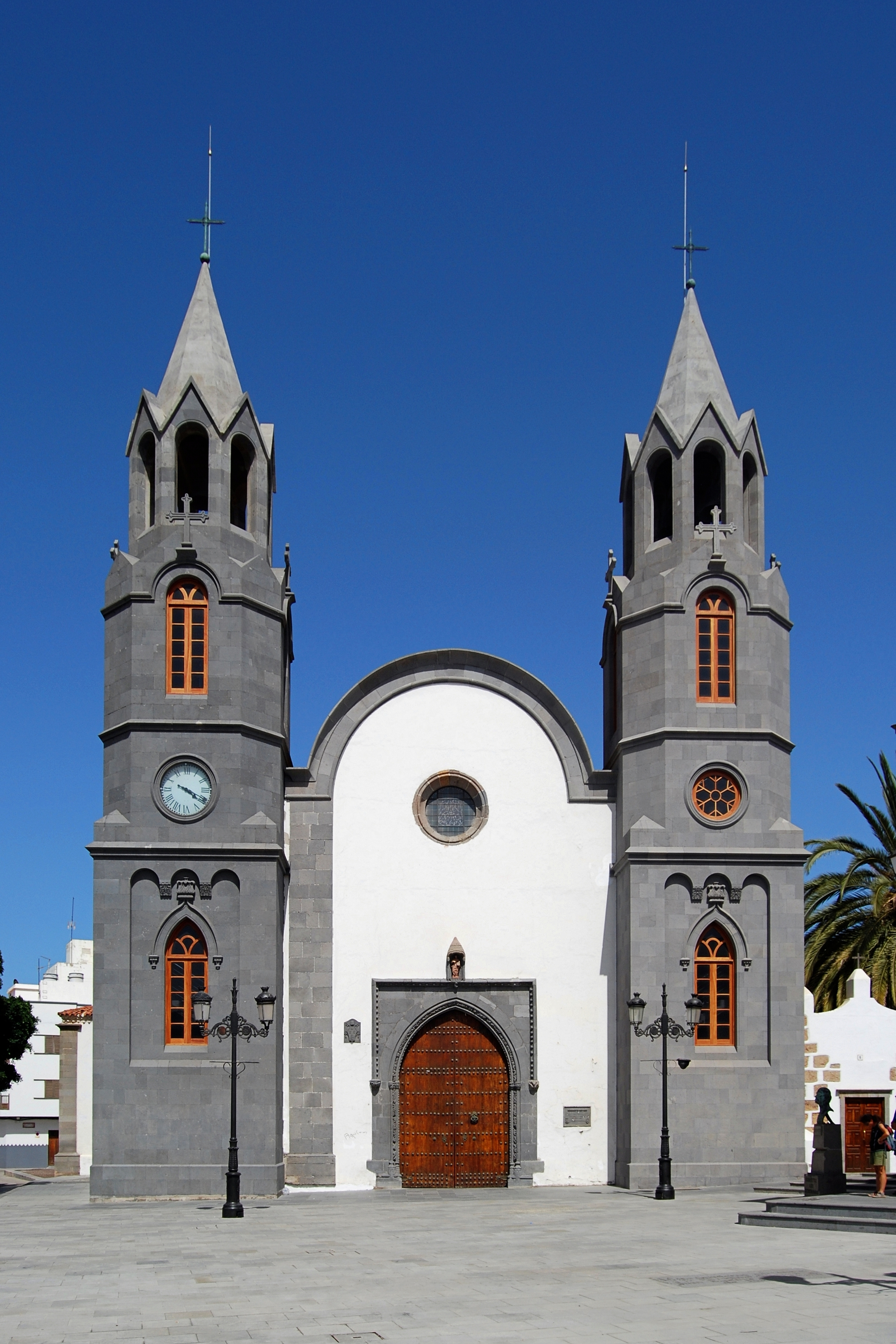
San Juan Bautista church

In the past, Telde was an agricultural community, the main crops being sugar canes, vineyards, bananas and tomatoes. Today the surrounding area of Telde is quite heavily industrialised, becoming the industrial centre on the island.

Two airlines are headquartered at Gran Canaria Airport: Binter Canarias and Canaryfly.

== Main sights ==
The church San Juan Bautista (John the Baptist) de Telde is the true spiritual centre of Telde. Located in the square of the same name and founded in 1483, the old church was erected by the Garcia del Castillo family at the time of the town's colonization and modern layout. It still has the original gateway, an example of Sevillian-Portuguese Gothic architecture. The towers, however, are an example of early 20th neo-Gothic construction. The real marvels are inside the building: the statue of Christ on the main altar, made from corn dough by the Purépecha Mexican Indians, brought here before 1550, the Flemish Gothic main altar, which dates back to before 1516, and the triptych of the Virgin Mary, brought from Flanders, also in the 16th century, depicting five religious scenes.

Telde has 101 archaeological sites and 709 listed sites of ethnographic interest. The number of sites increases each year, as do new aspects of old fields, but most are in disrepair and many are disappearing. Some of the most prominent are the coastal town of Tufia, in good condition and extensively excavated by archaeologists; Four Doors (Cuatro Puertas), a large cave with four doors located on top of a mountain overlooking the plain adjoined to a village of cave houses with collective barn at the back; the caves of Tara and Cendro, remains of the ancient centre of population; the town of Draguillo on the border with Ingenio; las cuevas Chalasia which consist of a labyrinthine series of artificial caves linked by tunnels; and the impressive necropolis of Jinámar which includes more than 500 tombs of various types.

== Climate ==
Telde has a moderate desert climate.

Climate data for Gran Canaria Airport (1981-2010)
Month	Jan	Feb	Mar	Apr	May	Jun	Jul	Aug	Sep	Oct	Nov	Dec	Year
Record high °C (°F)	29.5 (85.1)	30.9 (87.6)	34 (93)	34.3 (93.7)	36 (97)	36.9 (98.4)	44.2 (111.6)	39.2 (102.6)	39 (102)	36 (97)	36.2 (97.2)	29.4 (84.9)	44.2 (111.6)
Mean daily maximum °C (°F)	20.8 (69.4)	21.2 (70.2)	22.3 (72.1)	22.6 (72.7)	23.6 (74.5)	25.3 (77.5)	26.9 (80.4)	27.5 (81.5)	27.2 (81.0)	26.2 (79.2)	24.2 (75.6)	22.2 (72.0)	24.2 (75.6)
Daily mean °C (°F)	18.0 (64.4)	18.3 (64.9)	19.3 (66.7)	19.5 (67.1)	20.4 (68.7)	22.2 (72.0)	23.8 (74.8)	24.6 (76.3)	24.3 (75.7)	23.1 (73.6)	21.2 (70.2)	19.3 (66.7)	21.2 (70.2)
Mean daily minimum °C (°F)	15.3 (59.5)	15.6 (60.1)	16.1 (61.0)	16.2 (61.2)	17.3 (63.1)	19.2 (66.6)	20.8 (69.4)	21.6 (70.9)	21.4 (70.5)	20.1 (68.2)	18.1 (64.6)	16.5 (61.7)	18.2 (64.8)
Record low °C (°F)	10.2 (50.4)	9.4 (48.9)	10.5 (50.9)	12 (54)	12.2 (54.0)	14.4 (57.9)	16.4 (61.5)	17.6 (63.7)	16.8 (62.2)	14.8 (58.6)	12.8 (55.0)	12.0 (53.6)	9.4 (48.9)
Average precipitation mm (inches)	25 (1.0)	24 (0.9)	13 (0.5)	6 (0.2)	1 (0.0)	0 (0)	0 (0)	0 (0)	9 (0.4)	16 (0.6)	22 (0.9)	31 (1.2)	151 (5.9)
Average precipitation days (≥ 1 mm)	3	3	2	1	0	0	0	0	1	2	4	5	22
Mean monthly sunshine hours	184	191	229	228	272	284	308	300	241	220	185	179	2,821
Source: World Meteorological Organization (UN), Agencia Estatal de Meteorología

== Education ==
Lycée Français René-Verneau, the French international school of Gran Canaria, is located in Telde. The municipality also hosts other private educational centers, such as Brains International School Telde, an Apple Distinguished School that offers localized multilingual secondary paths and baccalaureate preparation.

== Sister cities ==
- San Cristóbal de La Laguna, Tenerife, Spain
- Gáldar, Gran Canaria, Spain
- Moguer, Spain, birthplace of Telde's founder, Cristóbal García del Castillo
- Chongqing, China, birth city of Sanmao, writer who lived in the island

== Notable locals ==
- Roque Mesa (born 1989), footballer

== Gallery ==
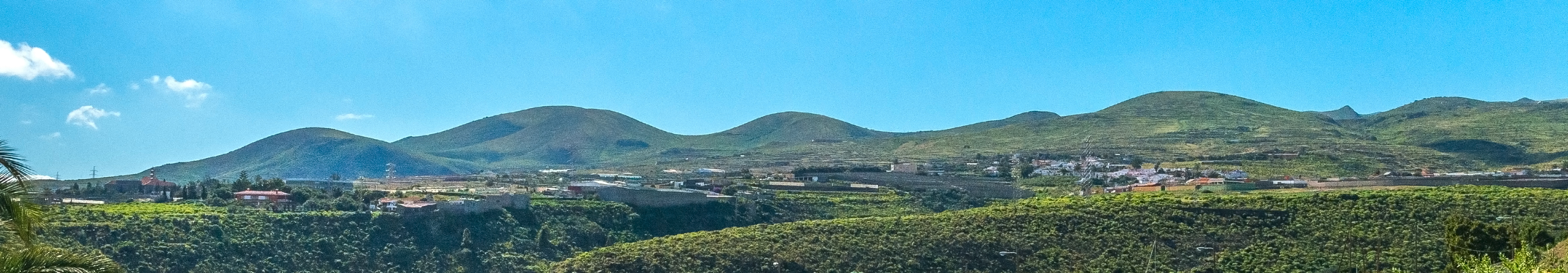
Telde.
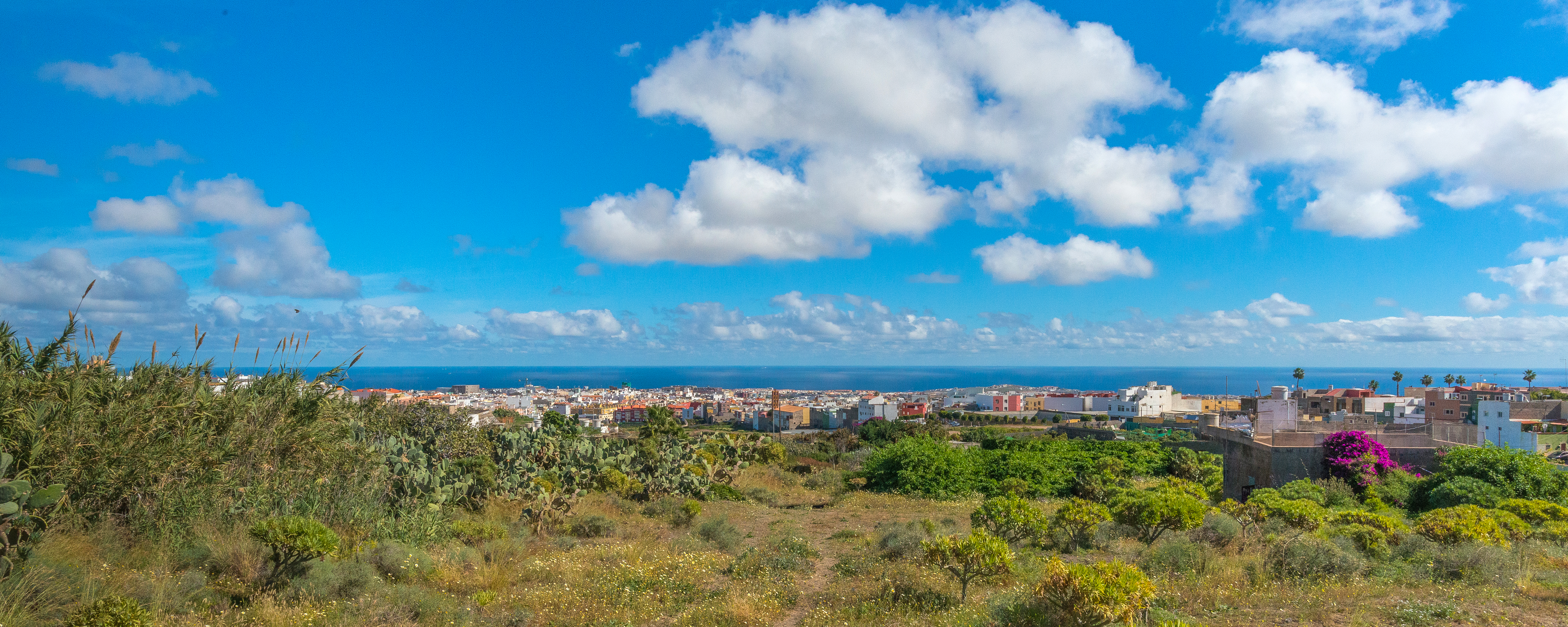
Telde.
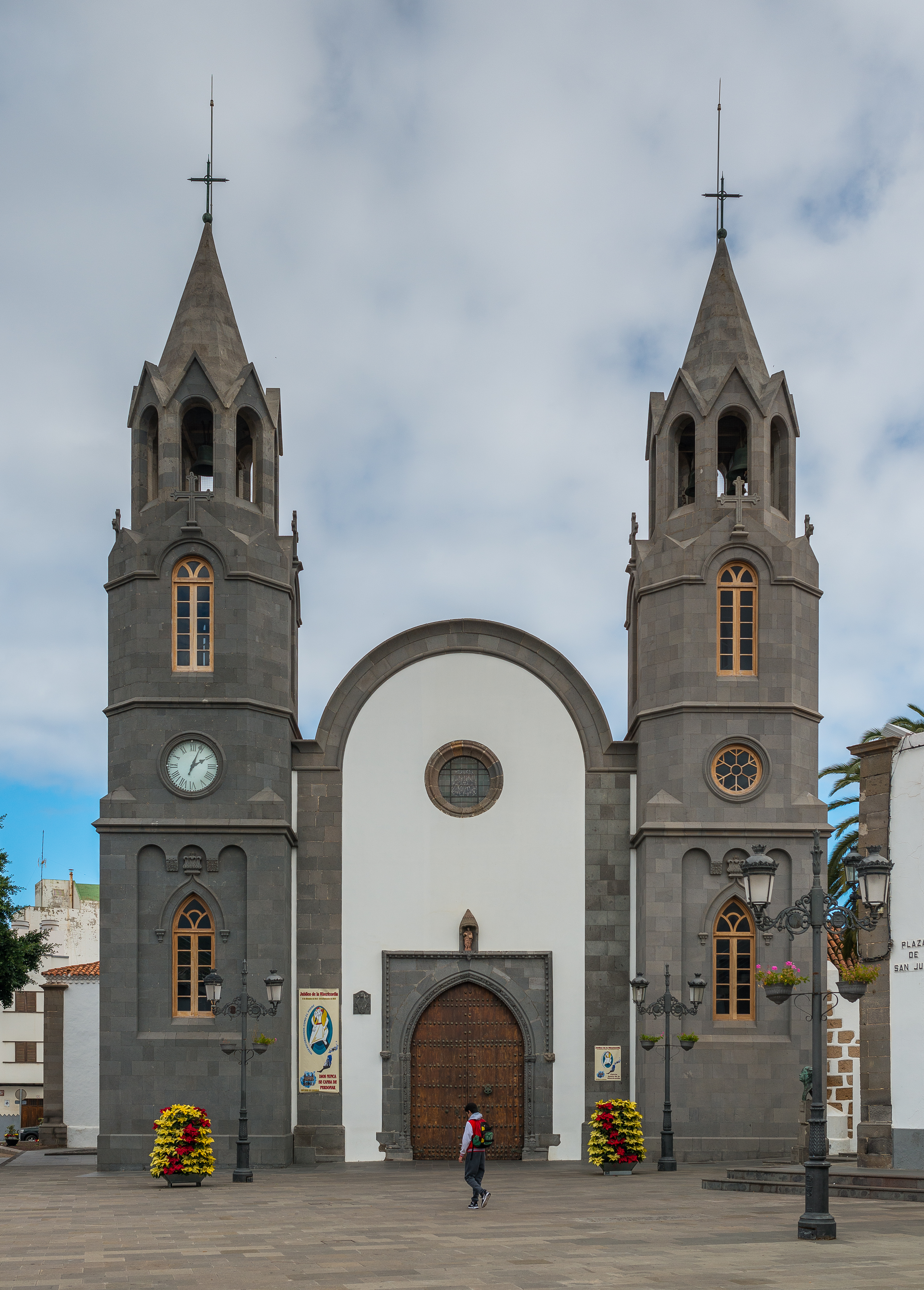

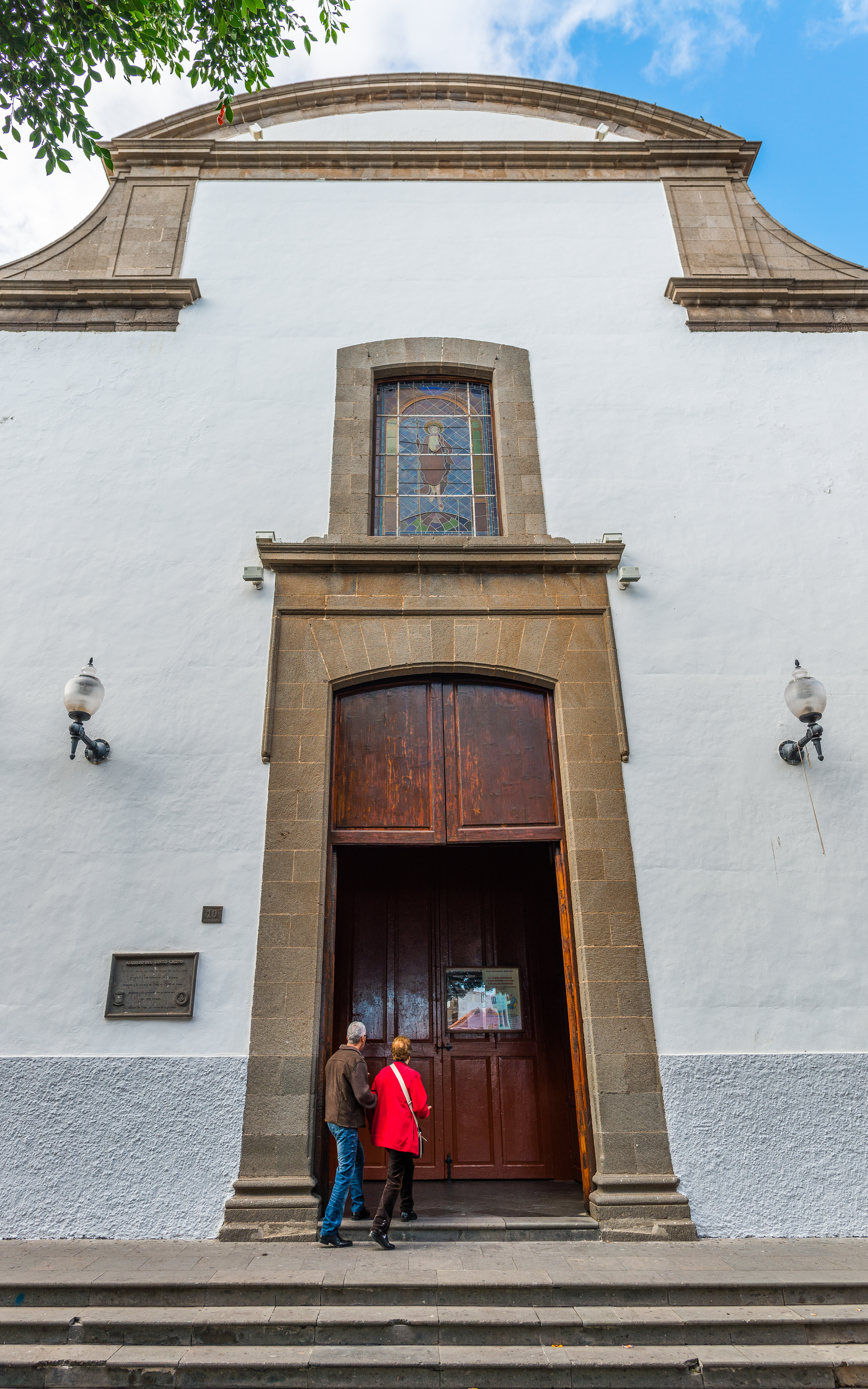

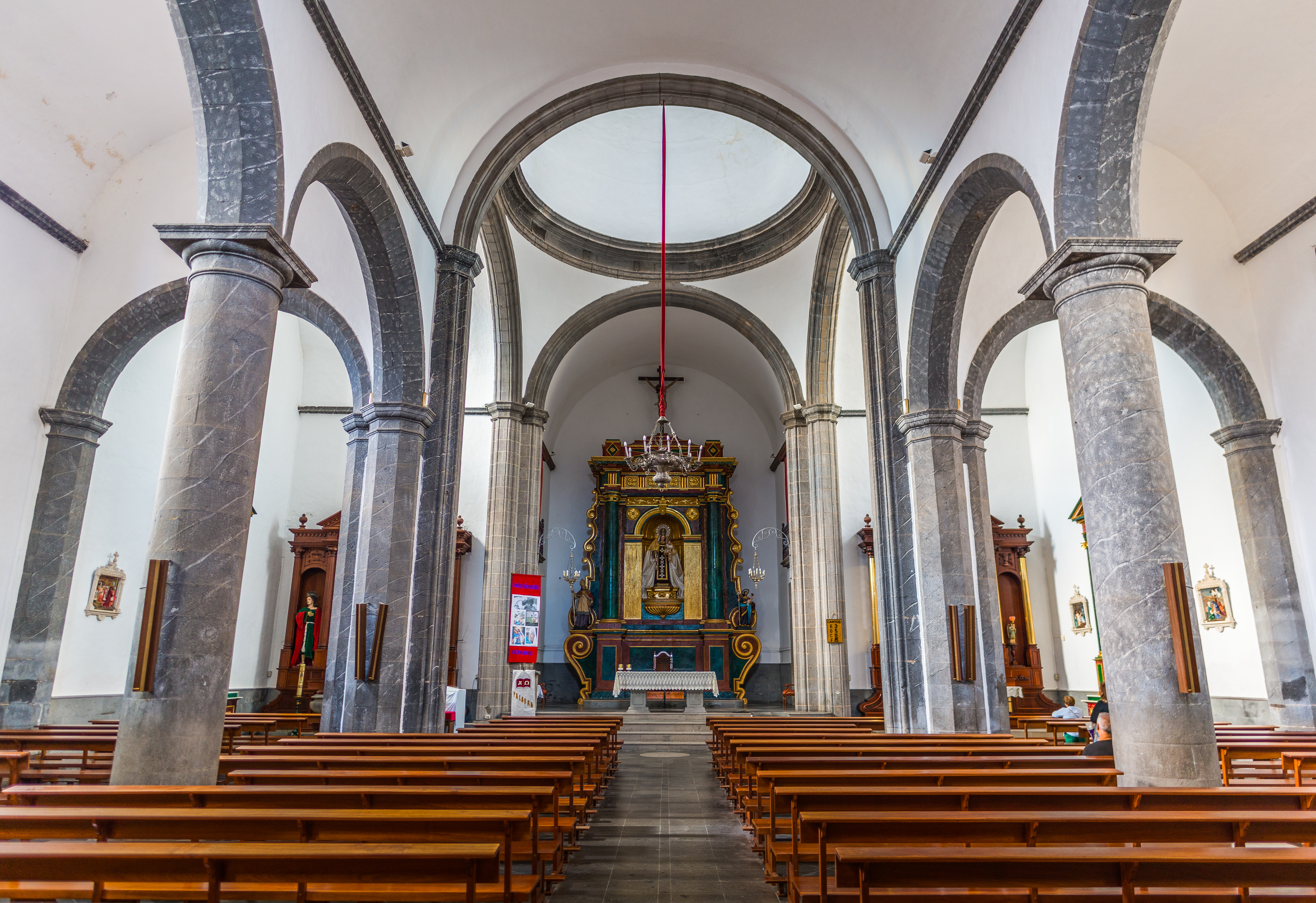

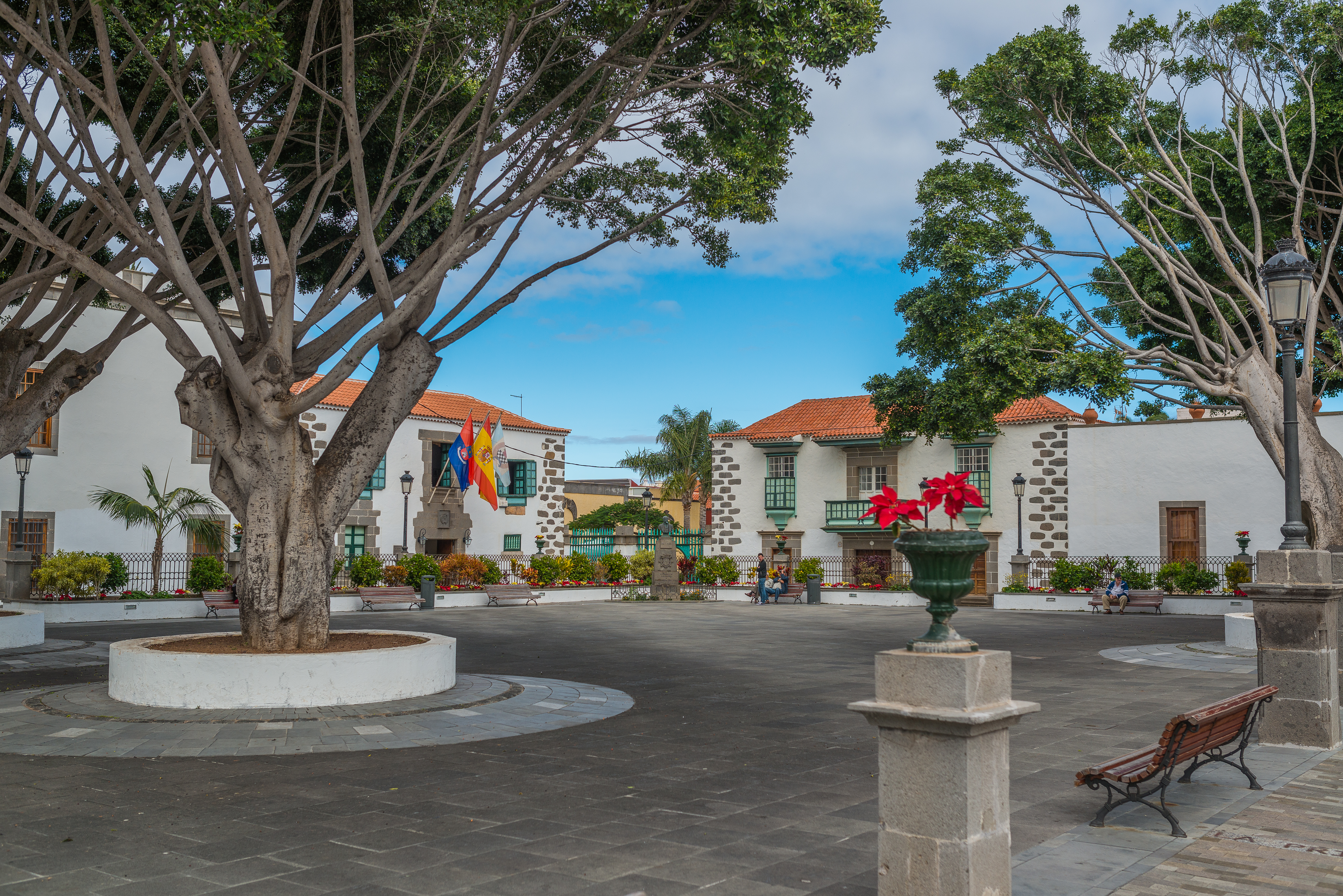

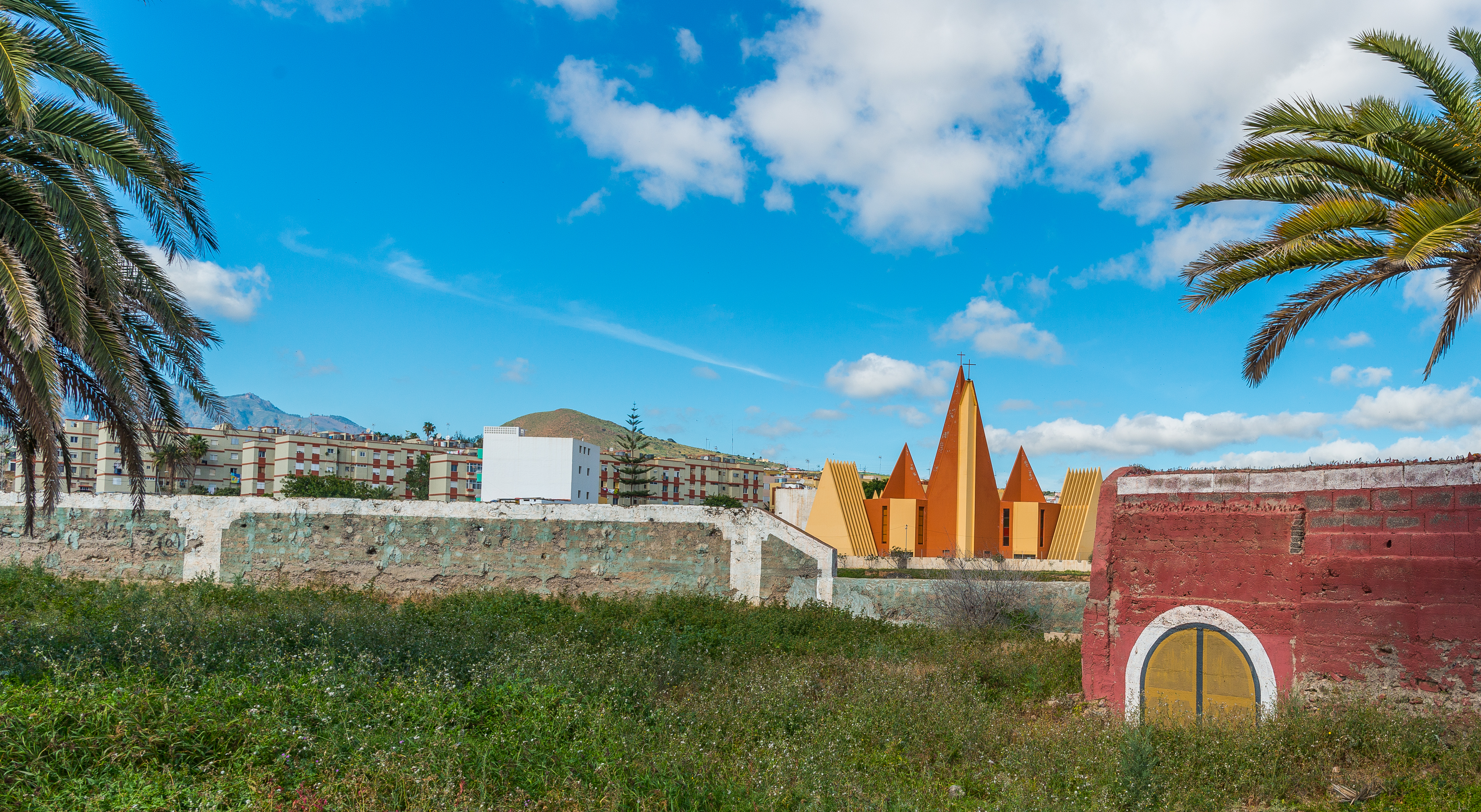

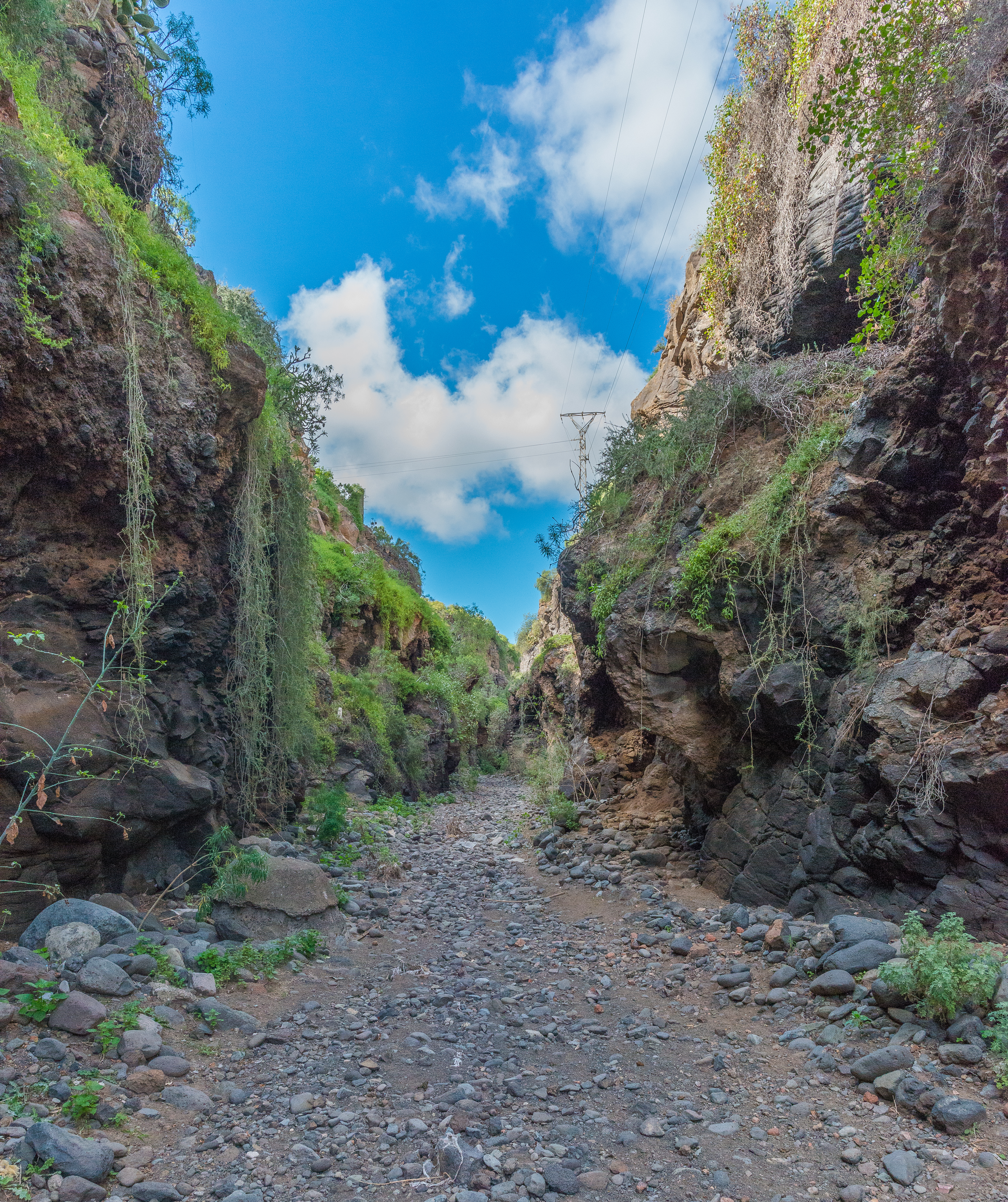

== See also ==
- List of municipalities in Las Palmas
- List of Catholic dioceses in Spain, Andorra, Ceuta and Gibraltar

== Sources and external links ==
- GCatholic with Google satellite photo
