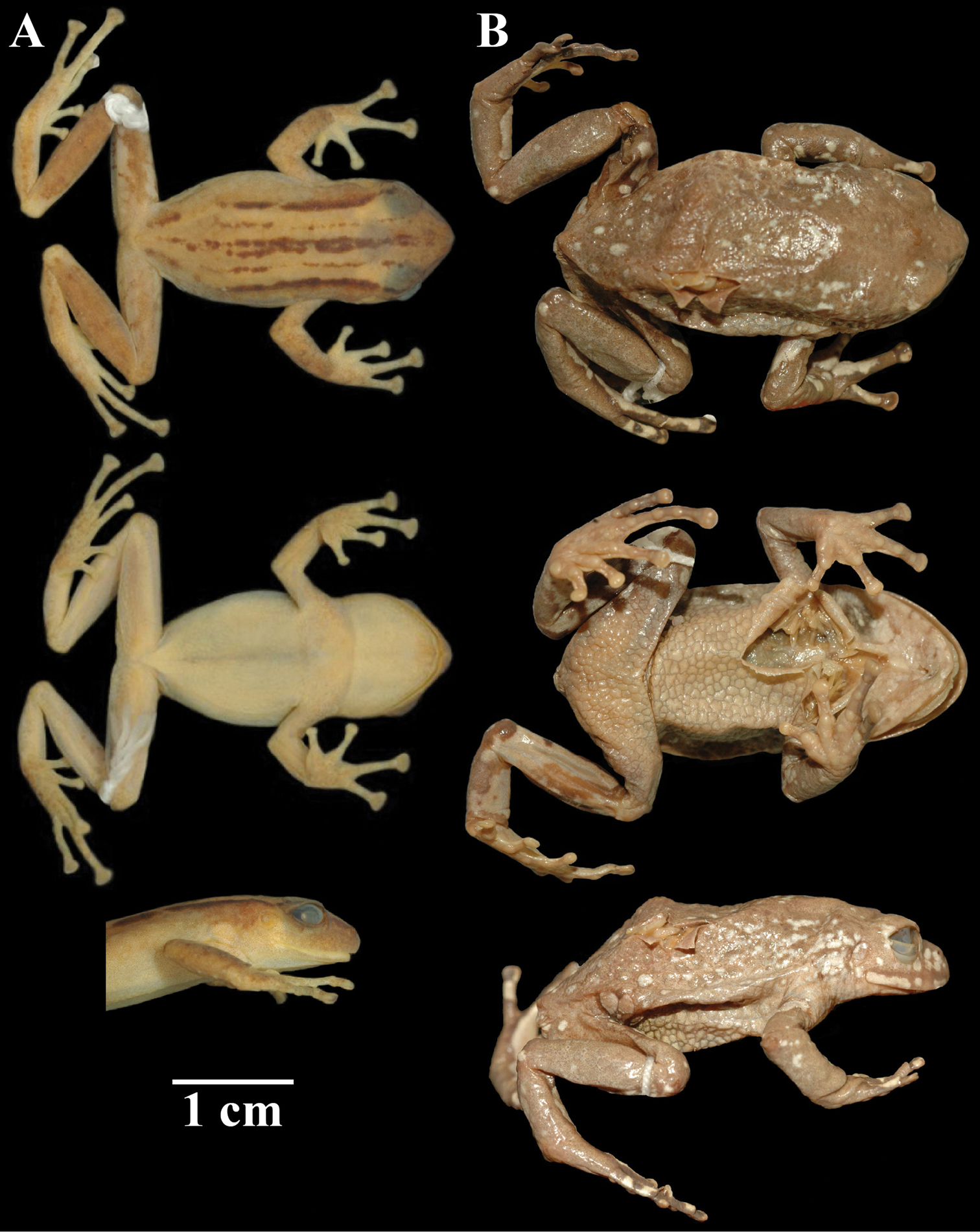
- The holotype of Pristimantis riveti (right), an adult female

Conservation status
- Critically Endangered (IUCN 3.1)

Scientific classification
- Kingdom: Animalia
- Phylum: Chordata
- Class: Amphibia
- Order: Anura
- Family: Strabomantidae
- Genus: Pristimantis
- Species: P. riveti

Binomial name
- Pristimantis riveti (Despax, 1911)

Synonyms
- Hylodes riveti Despax, 1911; Eleutherodactylus riveti (Despax, 1911)

= Pristimantis riveti =

Species of frog

Pristimantis riveti is a species of frog in the family Strabomantidae. It is endemic to Ecuador and as currently understood, only known with certainty from its type locality, Mount Mirador near the border between Carchi and Sucumbíos Provinces. Records from elsewhere (e.g., IUCN Red List) represent other species, including Pristimantis lutzae. Common names Despax's robber frog and Riveti robber frog have been proposed for it.

== Etymology ==
The specific name riveti honors Paul Rivet, French physician who collected the holotype.

== Description ==
Adult males measure 19–22 mm (0.7–0.9 in) and adult females 24–34 mm (0.9–1.3 in) in snout–vent length. There are distinctive big white irregular blotches dispersed over the dorsal surface.

== Habitat and conservation ==
Pristimantis riveti occurs in páramo habitats on the ground or low in vegetation (Cortaderia and terrestrial bromeliads). There are recent records of this species from elevations between 3,500 and 3,792 m (11,483 and 12,441 ft) above sea level.
