= Grimaldi man =

Hominin fossil

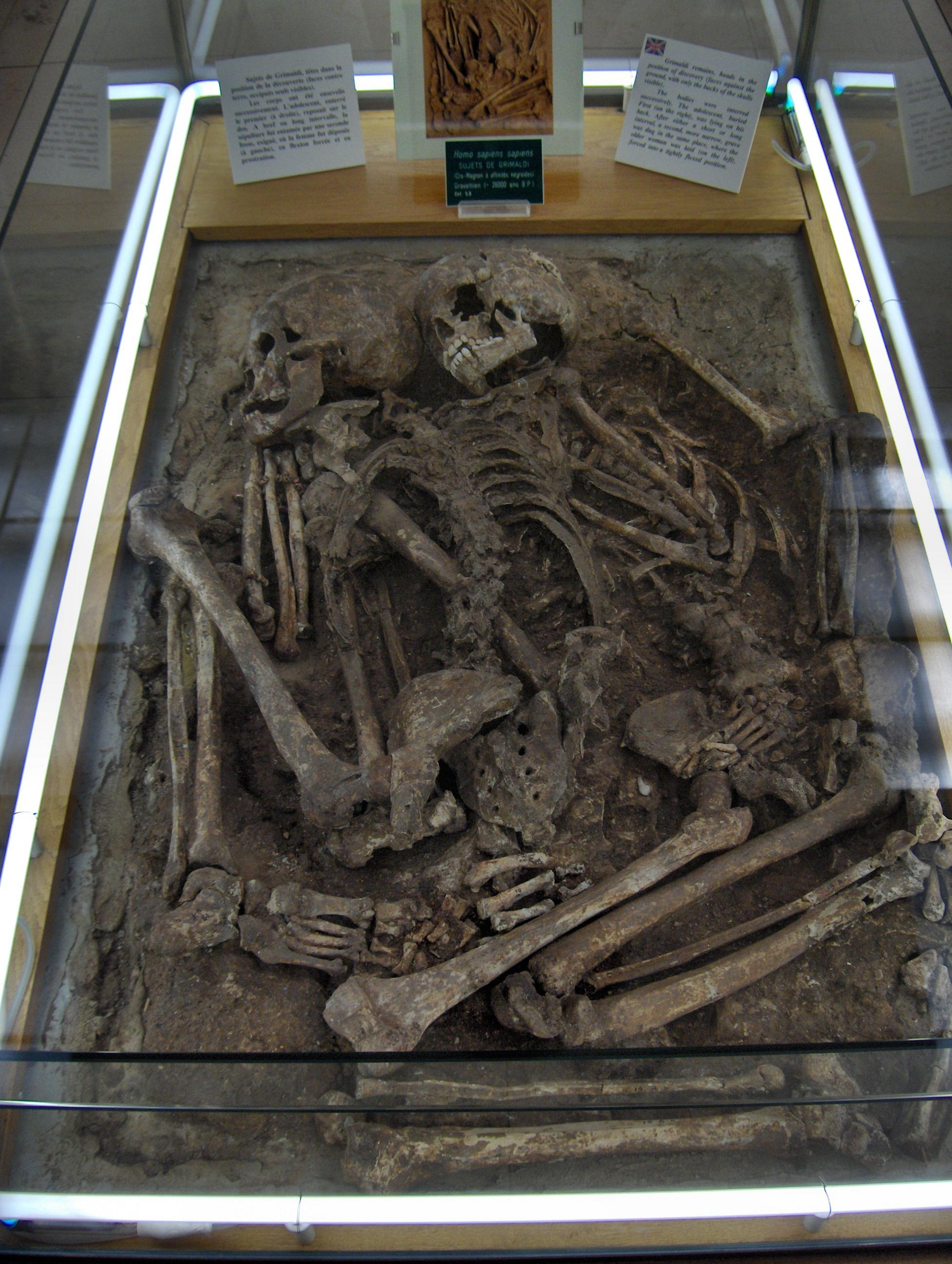
The Grimaldi find as displayed in the Musée d'Anthropologie in Monaco

Grimaldi man is the name formerly given to two human skeletons of the Upper Paleolithic discovered in Italy in 1901. The remains are now recognized as representing two individuals, and are dated to possibly being of the same age as the five Cro-Magnon skeletons discovered by French palaeontologist Louis Lartet in 1868, and classified as part of the wider Early European modern humans population. Grimaldi man was a highly notable discovery at the time for its age and anatomical value. The classification of the bones as negroid has also led to significant attention, though modern scientists no longer recognize race.

== History ==
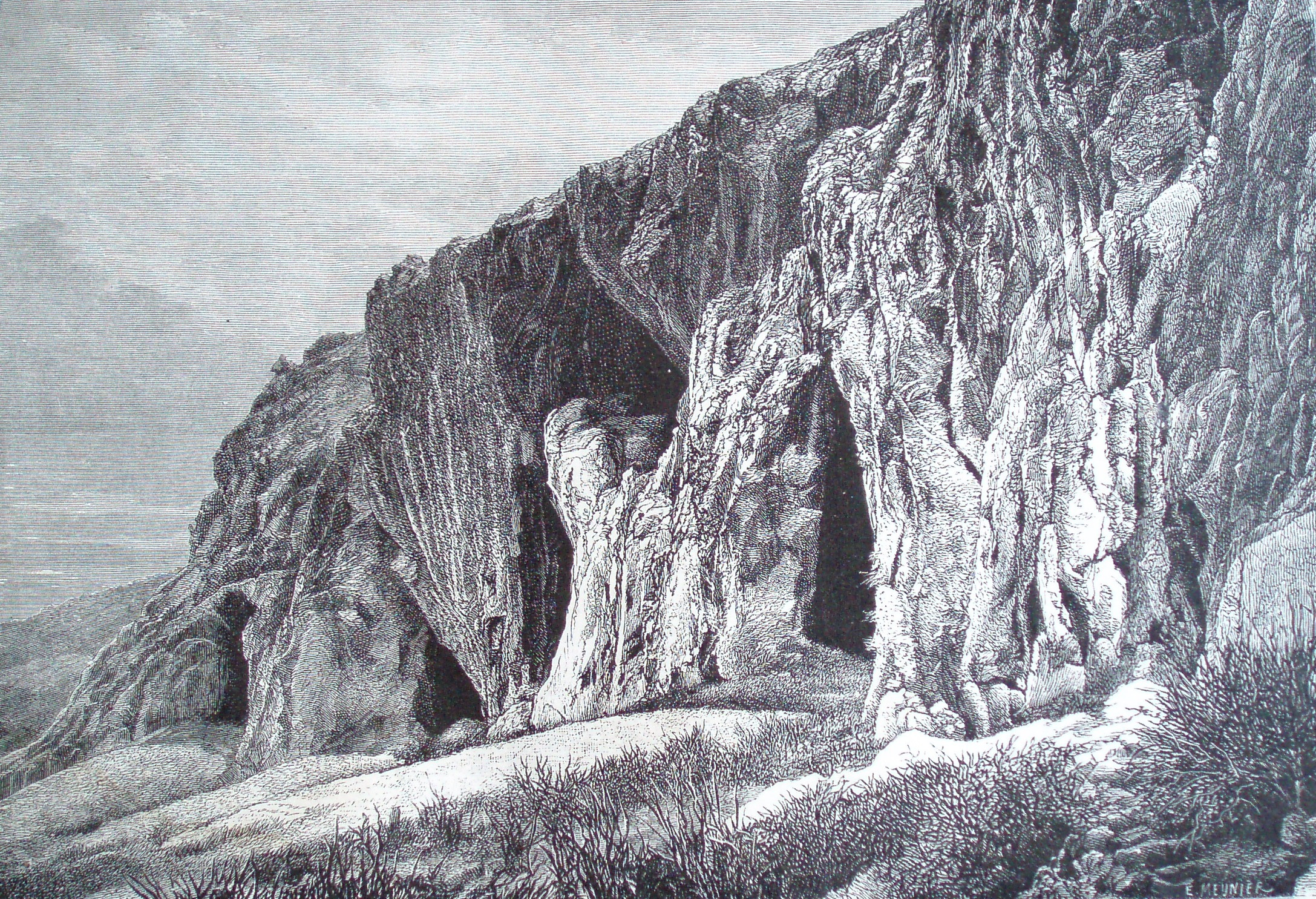
Grotte dei Balzi Rossi (Rochers Rouges) where the Grimaldi skeletons were found. Picture from Nouvelle géographie universelle, 1877

In the late 19th century, several Stone Age finds of extreme age had been made in the caves and rock shelters around the "Balzi Rossi" (the Red Cliff) near Ventimiglia in Italy. One of the more dramatic was that of two children with snail-shell belts in what was named as "Grotte dei fanciulli" (Cave of the Children) as well as stone tools and several Venus figurines. Around the turn of the 19th century, Albert I, Prince of Monaco financed the archaeological exploration of the seven most important caves. These were named "Caves of Grimaldi" in honour of the House of Grimaldi, of which Albert was a member. The find is on display in Le Musée d'anthropologie préhistorique in Monaco.

The caves yielded several finds. The remains from one of the caves, the "Barma Grande", have in recent time been radiocarbon dated to 25,000 years old, which places it in the Upper Paleolithic.

== Finding Grimaldi man ==
The Grotte dei fanciulli held Aurignacian artifacts and reindeer remains in the upper layers, while the lower layers exhibited a more tropical fauna with Merck's rhinoceros, hippopotamus and straight-tusked elephant. The lowermost horizon held Mousterian tools, associated with Neanderthals. The Grimaldi skeletons were found in the lower Aurignacian layer in June 1901, by the Canon de Villeneuve. The two skeletons appeared markedly different from the Cro-Magnon skeletons found higher in the cave and in other caves around Balzi Rossi, and were named "Grimaldi man" in honour of the Prince.

One of the two skeletons belonged to a woman past 50, the other an adolescent boy of 16 or 17. The skeletons were in remarkably good shape, though the weight of some 8 metres (26 ft) of sediments had crushed the skulls somewhat, particularly the fine bones of the face. Yet, de Villeneuve was reportedly struck by the prognathism of the skulls. With the crushed nature of the skulls, such observation would have been tentative at best. It was however later established that the old woman was indeed prognathic, though from a pathologic condition.

== Age ==
The dating techniques of the day were limited, but the Grimaldi people were believed to be of the late Palaeolithic period. An inference of the true age can be made from the layering. The more tropical fauna of the lower levels below the Grimaldi man skeletons had rhinoceros, hippopotamus and elephants, are known from the Mousterian Pluvial, a moist period from 50,000 to 30,000 years before present. The Aurignacian is 47,000 to 41,000 years old using the most recent calibration of the radiocarbon timescale. With the Grimaldi skeletons situated at the lowest Aurignacian layer, the true age is likely in the earlier range.

== Physical characteristics ==
The Grimaldi skeletons were very different from the finds that had been unearthed in Europe until then. Unlike the robust Neanderthals, the Grimaldi skeletons were slender and gracile, even more so than the Cro-Magnon finds from the same cave system. The Grimaldi people were small. While an adult Cro-Magnon generally stood over 170 cm (5 ft 7 in) tall (large males could reach 190 cm or 6 ft 3 in), neither of the two skeletons stood over 160 cm (5 ft 3 in). The boy was smallest at a mere 155 cm (5 ft 1 in).

The two skulls had rather tall braincases, unlike the long, low skulls found in Neanderthals and to a lesser extent in Cro-Magnons. The faces had wide nasal openings and lacked the rectangular orbitae and broad complexion so characteristic of Cro-Magnons. These traits, combined with what de Villeneuve interpreted as prognathism led the discoverers to the conclusion that the Grimaldi man had been of a "negroid" type. Some traits did not fit the picture though. The nasal bone had a high nasal bridge, like that of Cro-Magnons and modern Europeans, and was very unlike those of more tropical groups. The two rises of the frontal bone in the forehead were separate rather than forming a single median rise, another European trait. The cranial capacity was also quite large for their size.

== Restoration work and interpretation ==
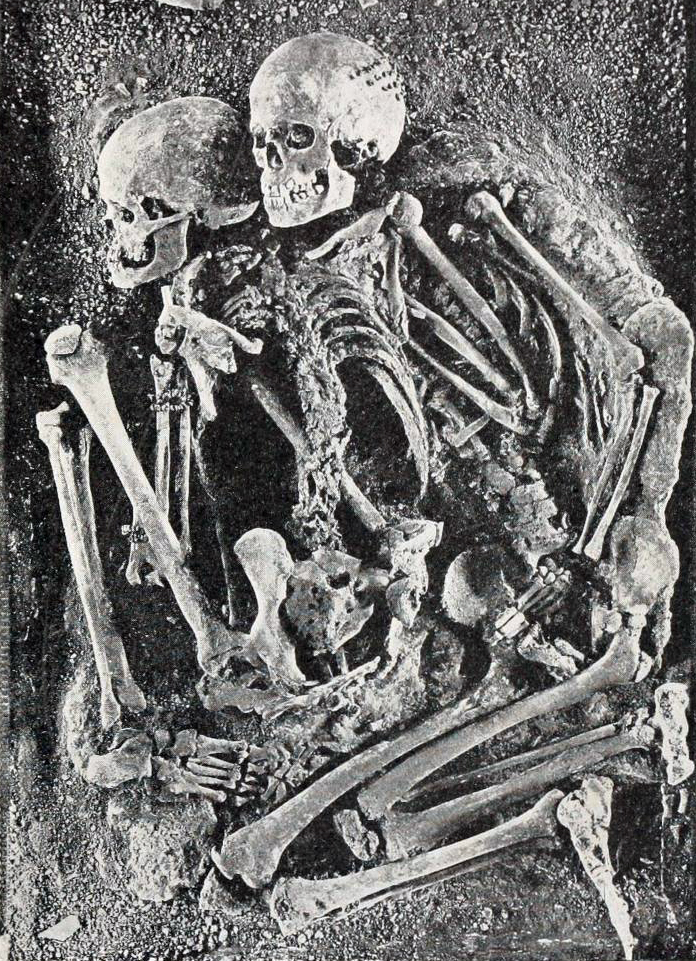
1916 photo

=== The need for reconstruction ===
The skulls had been damaged by the weight of the overlying sediments, and some reconstruction, particularly of the lower face was necessary. It has been established that the old woman suffered from a phenomenon known in orthodontics. Having lost all her molars of the lower jaw, the upper jaw had been progressively translated forward and the lower part of the face had become more protruding.

=== Reconstructing the face ===
The adolescent had all his teeth, but these were manipulated by the anthropologists M. Boule and R. Verneau, when trying to reconstruct the skull and the face. M. Boule drilled the maxillaries in order to release the wisdom teeth that were still inside them. By doing this, he changed the face, as the natural growth of the wisdom teeth would have remodeled the dental arc in a natural way. Having then too many teeth to fit the jawline, he reconstructed a very prognathic jaw, possibly bearing in mind the jaw of the woman. The diagnosis of "prognathism" in the adolescent is hence speculative.

=== Museum display ===
When the Grimaldi skeletons were found, the adolescent lay on his back and the woman face-down. The positions were changed when they were prepared for display. In order to make the prognathism visible, the skeletons were laid out on their side, which also suggested a ritual burial contrary to the original positions.

Photos of this display can be found in textbooks.

It is clear that Verneau did not intend to create a hoax. He documented his manipulations (at least partially), and his intention was to accentuate a feature he really believed to be present. His honesty is further corroborated as he also made and published photos of the excavation, where one can see the woman lying in a face-down position. Such photos were quite rare for that time.

== History of classification ==
=== Eurocentrism ===
The finding of the first Cro-Magnon in 1868 led to the idea that modern humans had arisen in Europe. Some French archaeologists at the time were even ready to declare France the cradle of humanity.

Craniometric characteristics of the Grimaldi remains shared certain similarities to tropical African but also European features. Sir Arthur Keith pointed out that the Grimaldi man may be of an "intermediate race" between Africans and Europeans. He suggested Grimaldi man might have found his way to Europe over a land bridge from Northern Africa. Both the Strait of Gibraltar and a route from Algeria via Sicily was thought to have been fordable in the late Paleolithic. Others have suggested the Grimaldi people may have been related to Bushmen (Khoisan people).

=== Classification as Cro-Magnon ===
By the 1970s, new finds from Jebel Qafzeh in Israel, Combe-Capelle in Southern France, Minatogawa in Japan, the Kabwe skull from Zambia and several Paleo-Indians had considerably broadened the knowledge of early human populations. The old term "Cro-Magnon" was replaced with "anatomically modern human" to encompass the expanding population out of Africa, including the Grimaldi remains.

=== Afrocentrism ===
Cheikh Anta Diop (1981) insisted that the Grimaldi man represent a distinct "black race", different from the Cro-Magnon found in other parts of Europe and previously argued this classification in his 1974 work, "The African Origin of Civilizations" 1974. Diop had defended his use of the terminology as a set of criteria "established by anthropologists to characterise the Negro: black skin, facial prognathism, crinkly hair, flat nose (the facial and nasal indicators being very arbitrarily selected by different anthro-pologists) negritic bone structure (ratio between upper and lower limbs)". Traditional racial categories have now been abandoned by scholars with the advent of modern genetics.
