= Wasigny =

- Commune
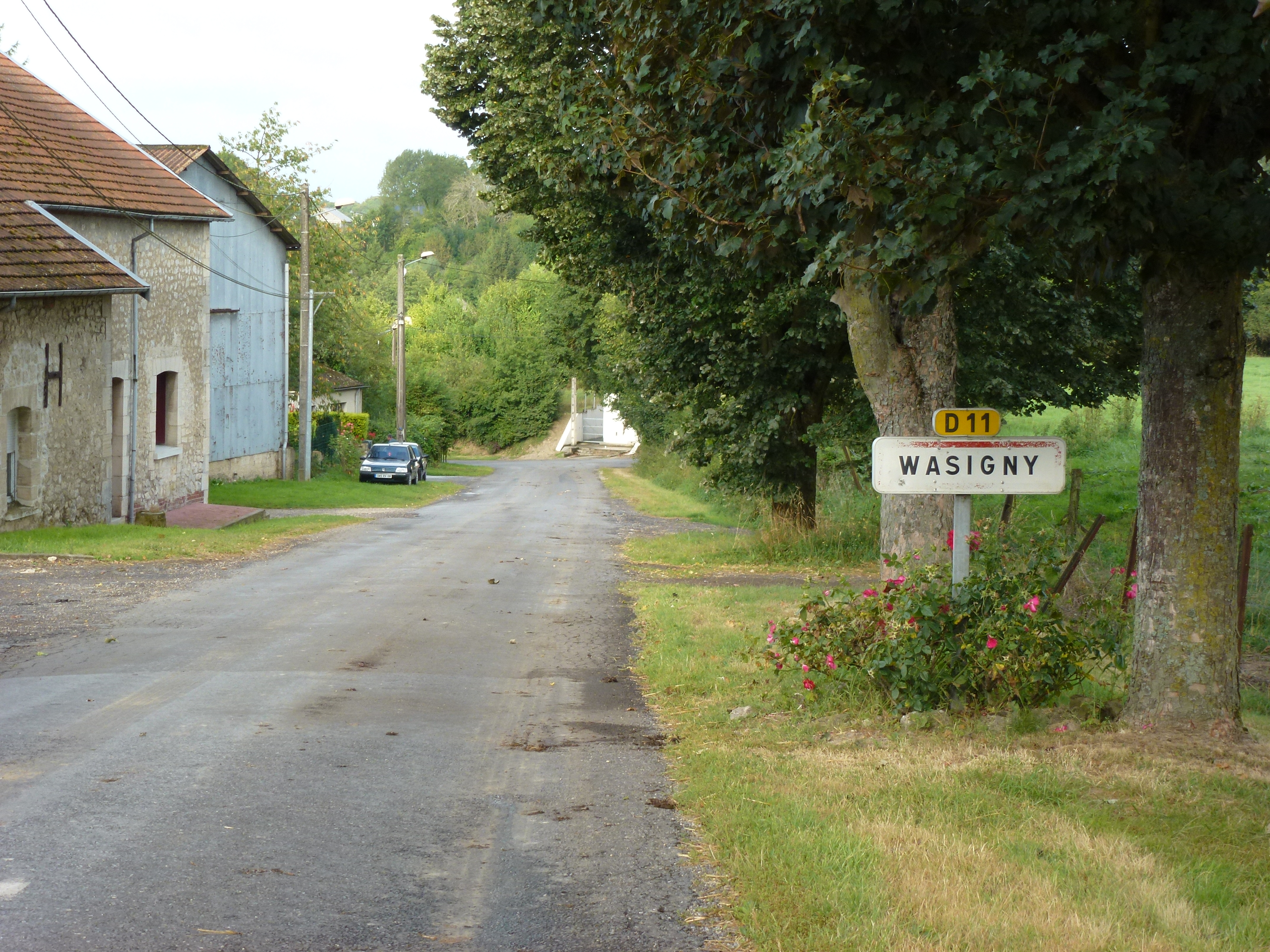
- The road into Wasigny

- Coat of arms
- Location of Wasigny
- Location within France Location within Grand Est
- Coordinates: 49°38′01″N 4°21′27″E
- Country: France
- Region: Grand Est
- Department: Ardennes
- Arrondissement: Rethel
- Canton: Signy-l'Abbaye
- Intercommunality: Crêtes Préardennaises

Government
  - Mayor (2024–2026): Pascal Bonaque
- Area^{1}: 9.98 km^{2} (3.85 sq mi)
- Elevation: 102 m (335 ft)
- Highest elevation: 177 m (581 ft)
- Lowest elevation: 85 m (279 ft)
- Population (2023): 262
  - Density: 26.3/km^{2} (68.0/sq mi)
- Time zone: UTC+01:00 (CET)
  - Summer (DST): UTC+02:00 (CEST)
- INSEE/Postal code: 08499 /08270
- ^{1} French Land Register data, which excludes lakes, ponds, glaciers > 1 km^{2} (0.386 sq mi or 247 acres) and river estuaries.

Wasigny is a commune in the Ardennes department and Grand Est region of north-eastern France.

== Population ==
Historical population
Year	Pop.	±% p.a.
1968	494	—
1975	406	−2.76%
1982	345	−2.30%
1990	331	−0.52%
1999	319	−0.41%
2007	349	+1.13%
2012	374	+1.39%
2017	331	−2.41%
2023	262	−3.82%
Source: INSEE

== Sights ==
A 15th-century market hall dominates the village square.

== Notable people ==
- Paul Rivet (1876–1958), French ethnologist

== See also ==
- Communes of the Ardennes department
