= René Verneau =

French paleoanthropologist

Rene Verneau
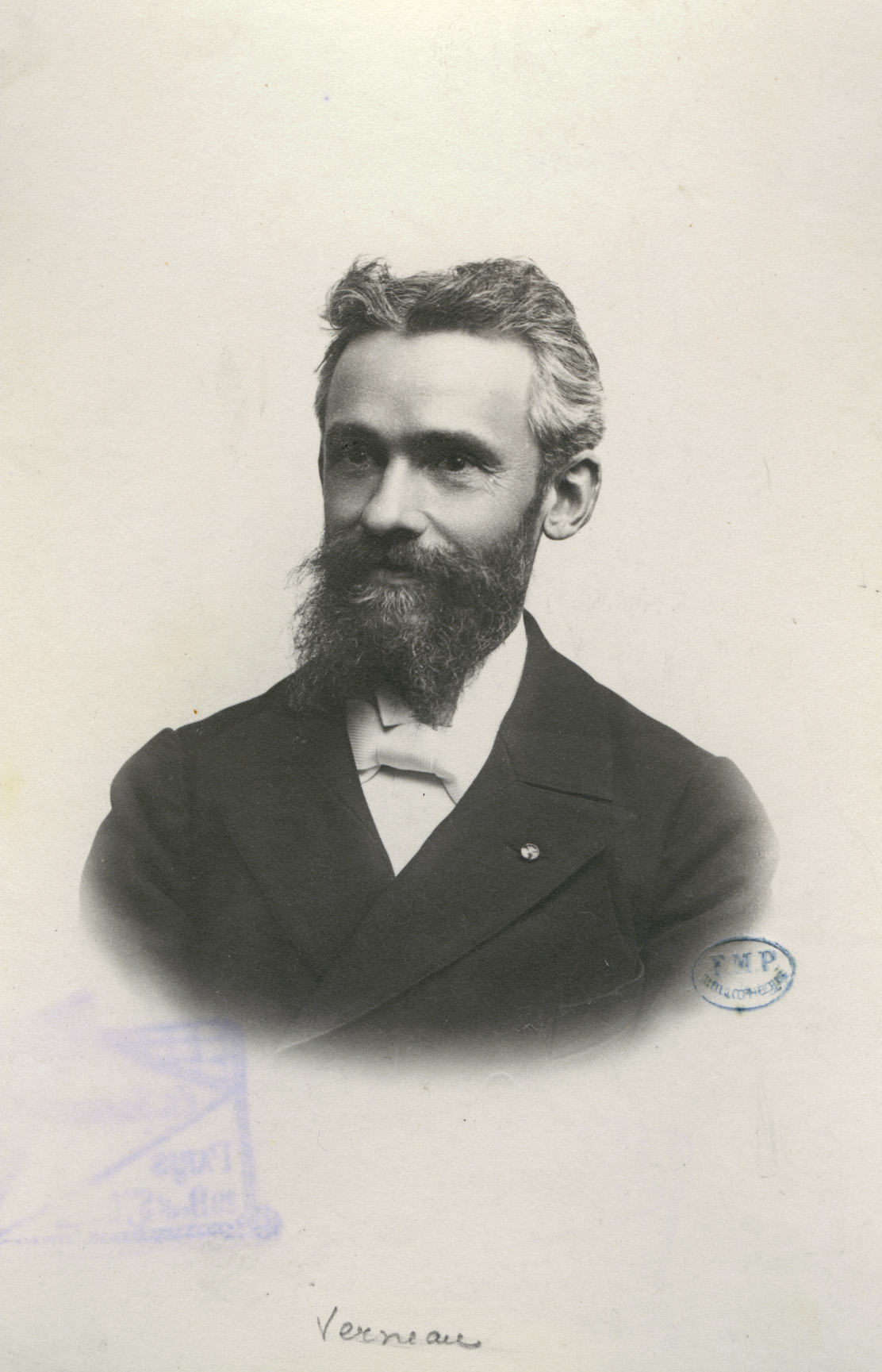
- Born: 25 April 1852
- Died: 7 January 1938 (aged 85)

René Verneau (French pronunciation: [ʁəne vɛʁno]; 25 April 1852 – 7 January 1938) was a French palaeoanthropologist. Among his work is the reconstruction of the Grimaldi man from Liguria, and study of the Guanches.

In 2005, the Mission laïque française college in Las Palmas de Gran Canaria, the only francophone college in the island, adopted his name.

== See also ==
- Palaeoanthropology on Muséum national d'Histoire naturelle
