= Beach =

Area of loose particles at the edge of a body of water

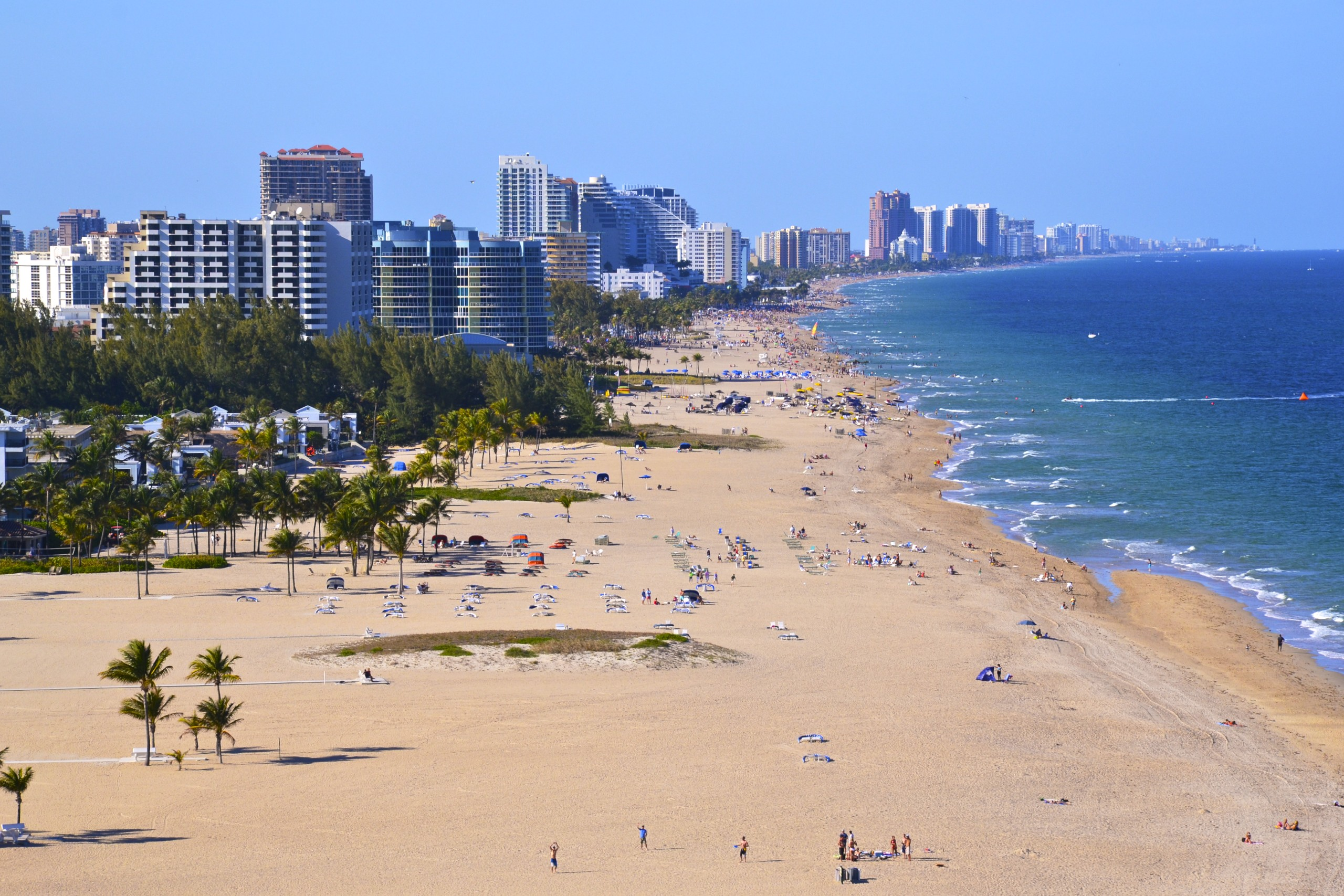
A recreational beach in Fort Lauderdale, Florida

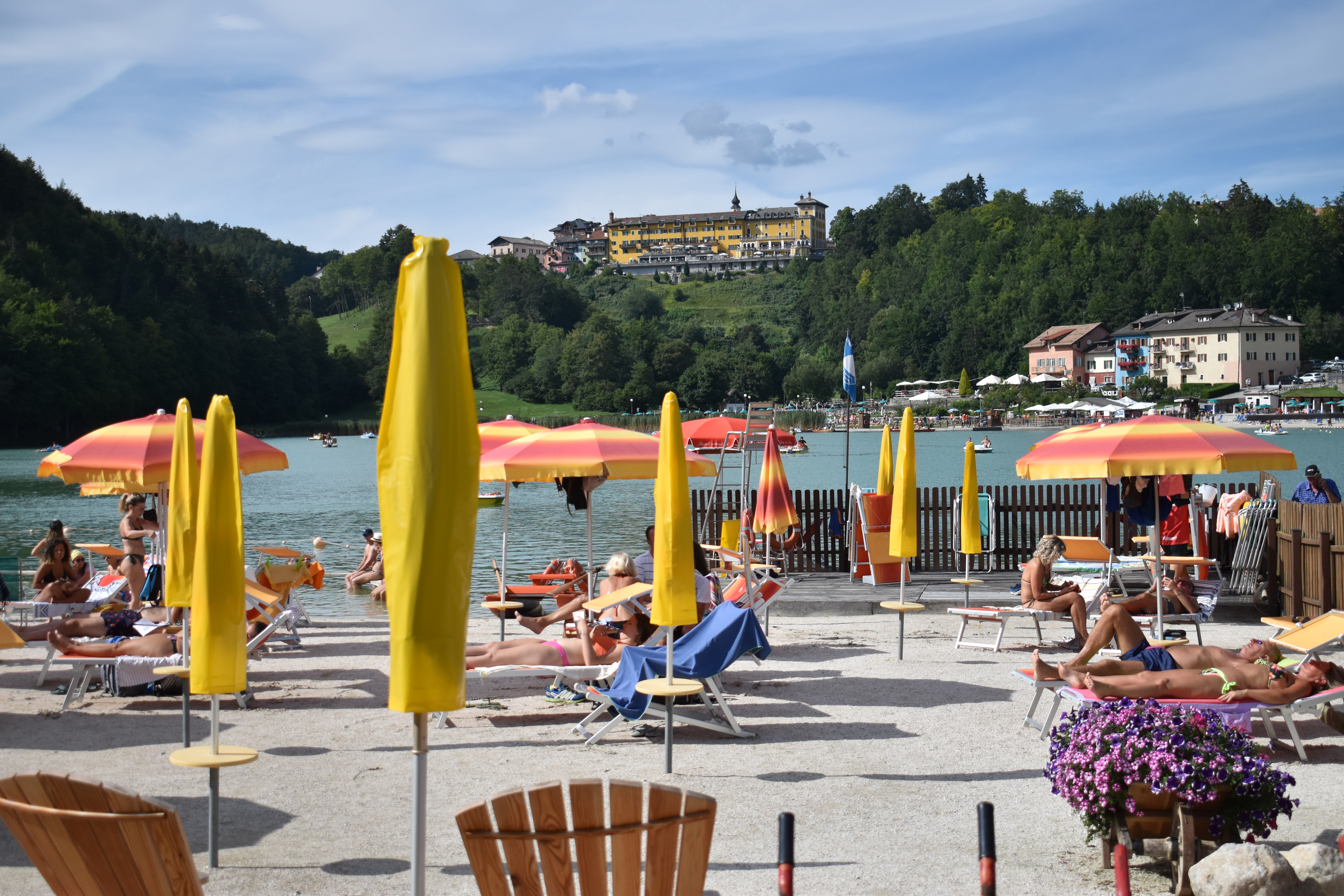
Lake beach along the Lake Lavarone, Trentino-Alto Adige, Italy

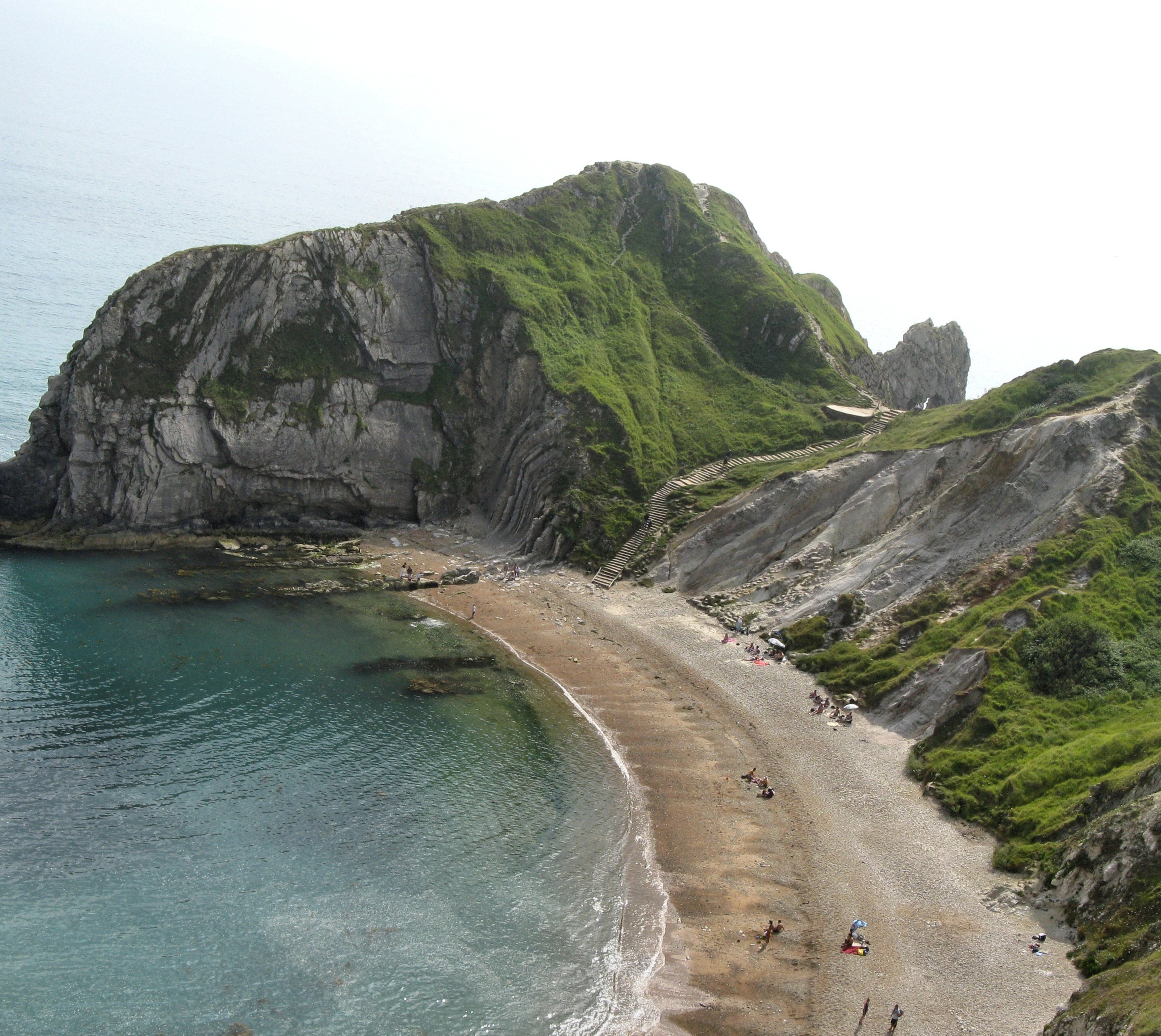
St Oswalds Bay, Dorset, England. Wild sand and shingle beaches are shaped and maintained naturally by wave actions.

A beach is a landform alongside a body of water which consists of loose particles. The particles composing a beach are typically made from rock, such as sand, gravel, shingle, pebbles, etc., or biological sources, such as mollusc shells or coralline algae. Sediments settle in different densities and structures, depending on the local wave action and weather, creating different textures, colors and gradients or layers of material.

Though some beaches form on inland freshwater locations such as lakes and rivers, most beaches are in coastal areas where wave or current action deposits and reworks sediments. Erosion and changing of beach geologies happens through natural processes, like wave action and extreme weather events. Where wind conditions are correct, beaches can be backed by coastal dunes which offer protection and regeneration for the beach. However, these natural forces have become more extreme due to climate change, permanently altering beaches at very rapid rates. Some estimates describe as much as 50 percent of the earth's sandy beaches disappearing by 2100 due to climate-change driven sea level rise.

Sandy beaches occupy about more than one third of global coastlines by 31%, Africa is the world continent with the most sandy beaches surrounding it up to 67%. These beaches are popular for recreation, playing important economic and cultural roles—often driving local tourism industries. To support these uses, some beaches have human-made infrastructure, such as lifeguard posts, changing rooms, showers, shacks and bars. They may also have hospitality venues (such as resorts, camps, hotels, and restaurants) nearby or housing, both for permanent and seasonal residents.

Human forces have significantly changed beaches globally: direct impacts include bad construction practices on dunes and coastlines, while indirect human impacts include water pollution, plastic pollution and coastal erosion from sea level rise and climate change. Some coastal management practices are designed to preserve or restore natural beach processes, while some beaches are actively restored through practices like beach nourishment.

Wild beaches, also known as undeveloped or undiscovered beaches, are not developed for tourism or recreation. Preserved beaches are important biomes with important roles in aquatic or marine biodiversity, such as for breeding grounds for sea turtles or nesting areas for seabirds or penguins. Preserved beaches and their associated dune are important for protection from extreme weather for inland ecosystems and human infrastructure.

== Location and profile ==
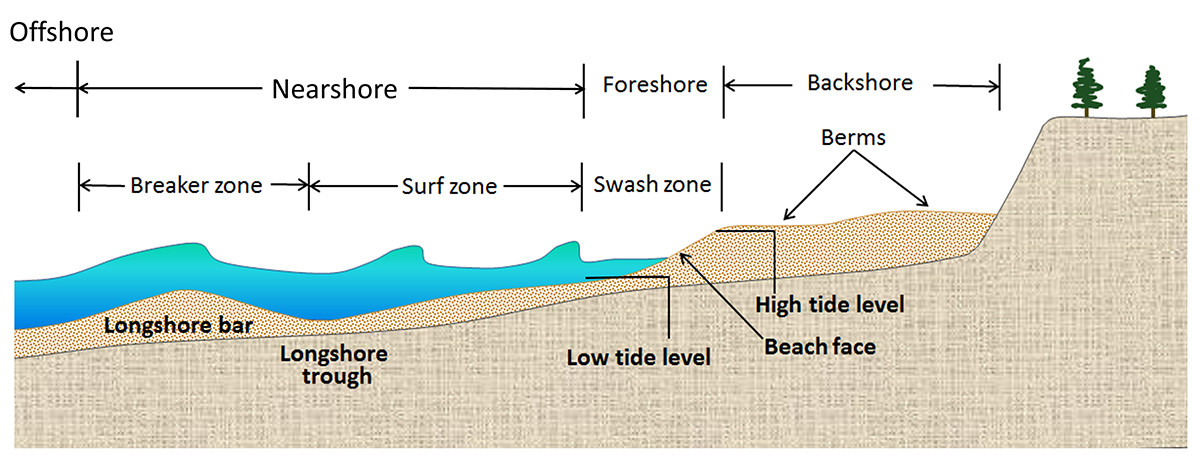
A berm is a nearly horizontal portion that stays dry except during extremely high tides and storms. The swash zone is alternately covered and exposed by wave run-up. The beach face is the sloping section below the berm that is exposed to the swash of the waves. The wrack line (not shown here) is the highest reach of the daily tide where organic and inorganic debris is deposited by wave action. May have sand dunes.

Although the seashore is most commonly associated with the word beach, beaches are also found by lakes and alongside large rivers.

Beach may refer to:

- small systems where rock material moves onshore, offshore, or alongshore by the forces of waves and currents; or
- geological units of considerable size.

The former are described in detail below; the larger geological units are discussed elsewhere under bars.

There are several conspicuous parts to a beach that relate to the processes that form and shape it. The part mostly above water (depending upon tide), and more or less actively influenced by the waves at some point in the tide, is termed the beach berm. The berm is the deposit of material comprising the active shoreline. The berm has a crest (top) and a face—the latter being the slope leading down towards the water from the crest. At the very bottom of the face, there may be a trough, and further seaward one or more long shore bars: slightly raised, underwater embankments formed where the waves first start to break.

The sand deposit may extend well inland from the berm crest, where there may be evidence of one or more older crests (the storm beach) resulting from very large storm waves and beyond the influence of the normal waves. At some point the influence of the waves (even storm waves) on the material comprising the beach stops, and if the particles are small enough (sand size or smaller), winds shape the feature. Where wind is the force distributing the grains inland, the deposit behind the beach becomes a dune.

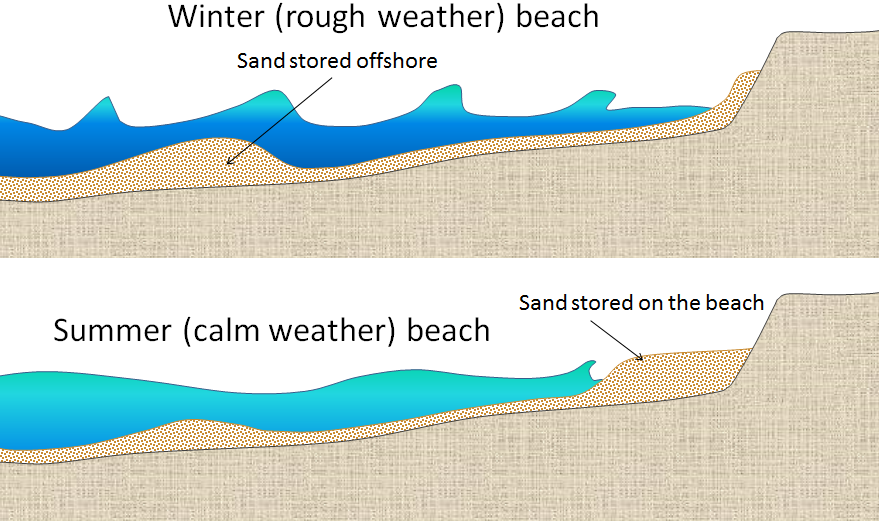
The differences between summer and winter on beaches in areas where the winter conditions are rougher and waves have a shorter wavelength but higher energy. In winter, sand from the beach is stored offshore.

These geomorphic features compose what is called the beach profile. The beach profile changes seasonally due to the change in wave energy experienced during summer and winter months. In temperate areas where summer is characterised by calmer seas and longer periods between breaking wave crests, the beach profile is higher in summer. The gentle wave action during this season tends to transport sediment up the beach towards the berm where it is deposited and remains while the water recedes. Onshore winds carry it further inland forming and enhancing dunes.

Conversely, the beach profile is lower in the storm season (winter in temperate areas) due to the increased wave energy, and the shorter periods between breaking wave crests. Higher energy waves breaking in quick succession tend to mobilise sediment from the shallows, keeping it in suspension where it is prone to be carried along the beach by longshore currents, or carried out to sea to form longshore bars, especially if the longshore current meets an outflow from a river or flooding stream. The removal of sediment from the beach berm and dune thus decreases the beach profile.

If storms coincide with unusually high tides, or with a freak wave event such as a tidal surge or tsunami which causes significant coastal flooding, substantial quantities of material may be eroded from the coastal plain or dunes behind the berm by receding water. This flow may alter the shape of the coastline, enlarge the mouths of rivers and create new deltas at the mouths of streams that had not been powerful enough to overcome longshore movement of sediment.

The line between beach and dune is difficult to define in the field. Over any significant period of time, sediment is always being exchanged between them. The drift line (the high point of material deposited by waves) is one potential demarcation. This would be the point at which significant wind movement of sand could occur, since the normal waves do not wet the sand beyond this area. However, the drift line is likely to move inland under assault by storm waves.

== Formation ==
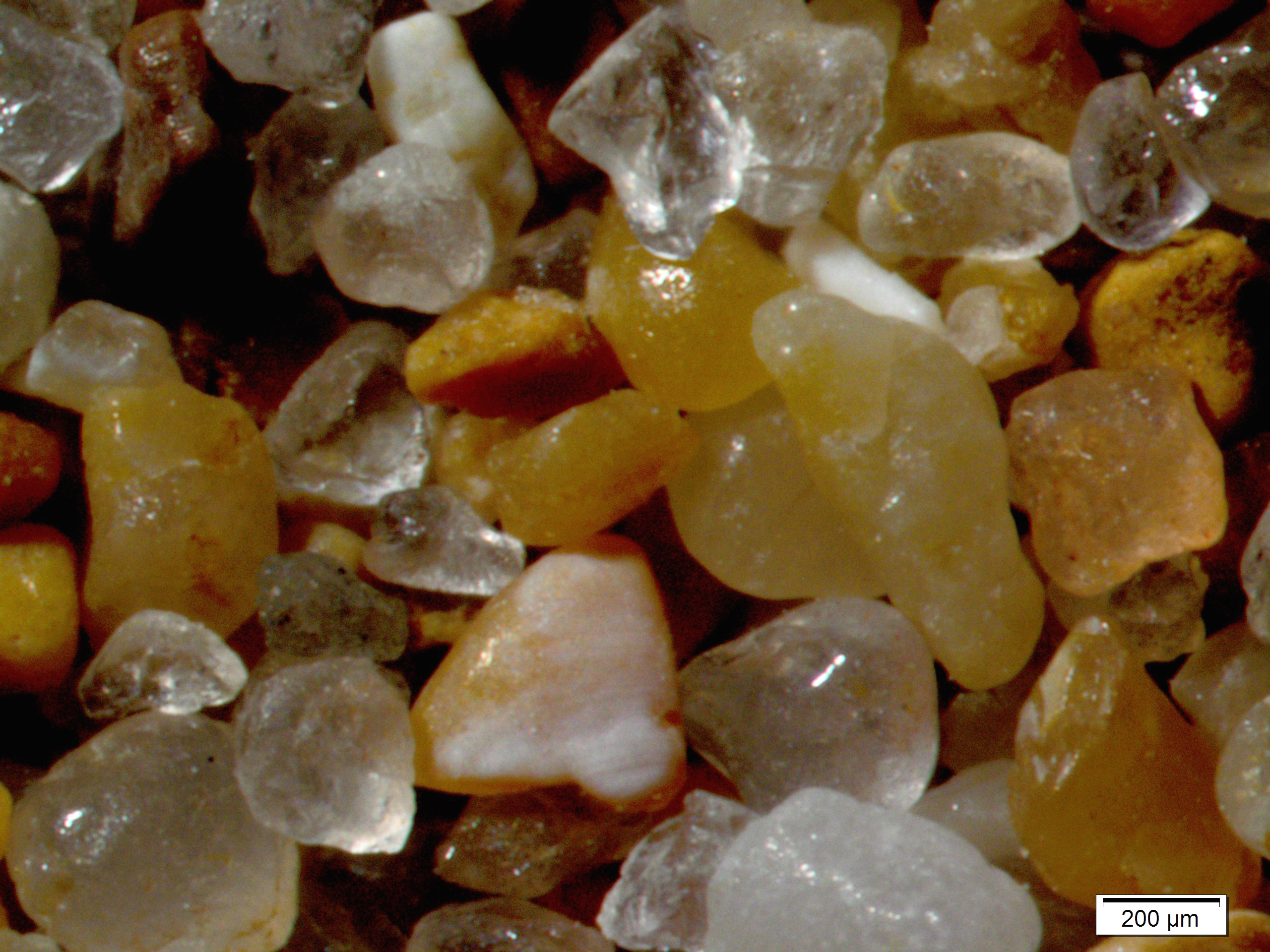
Quartz sand particles and shell fragments from a beach. The primary component of typical beach sand is quartz, or silica (SiO_{2}).

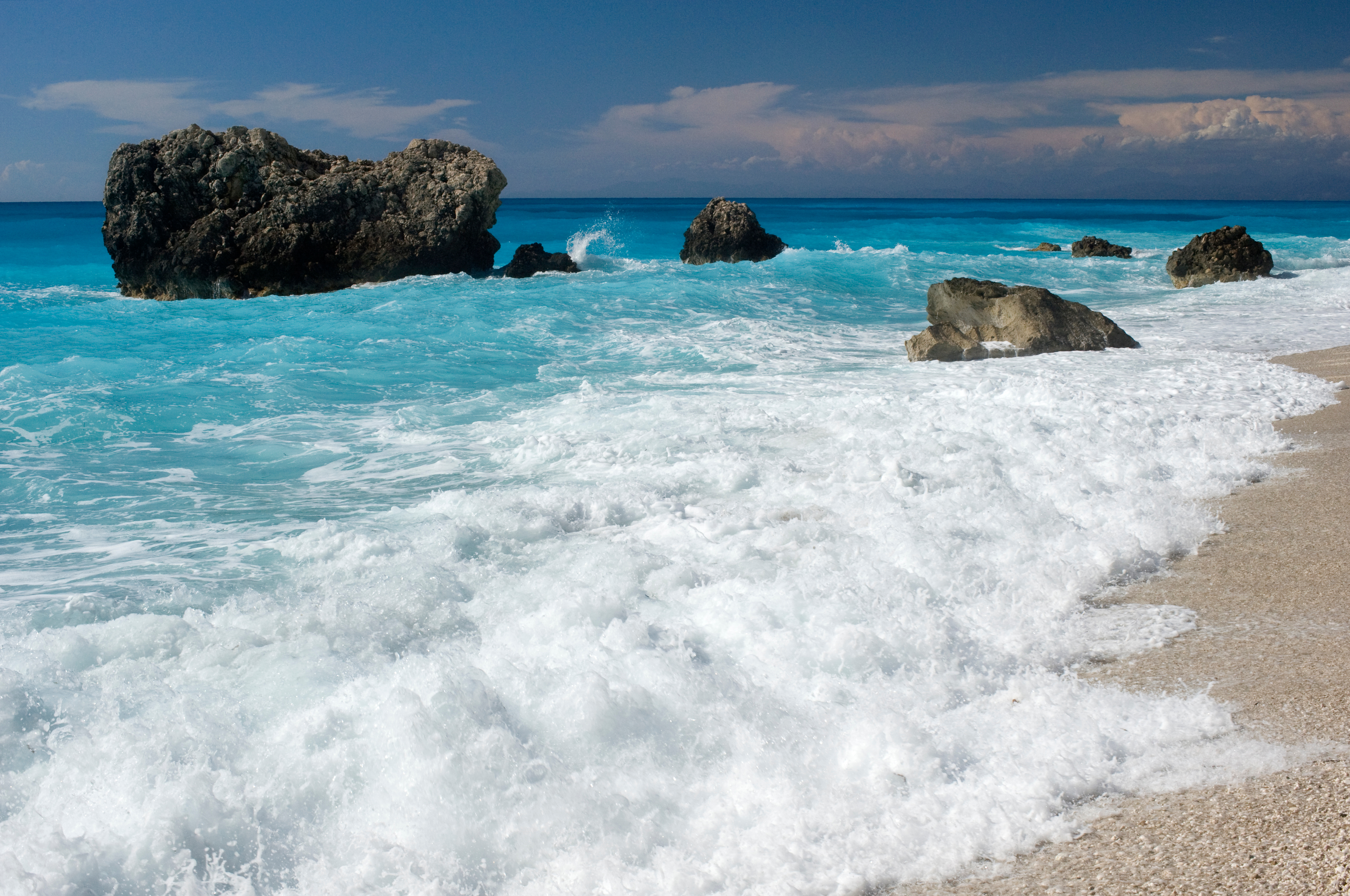
Sand and shingle is scoured, graded and moved around by the action of waves and currents

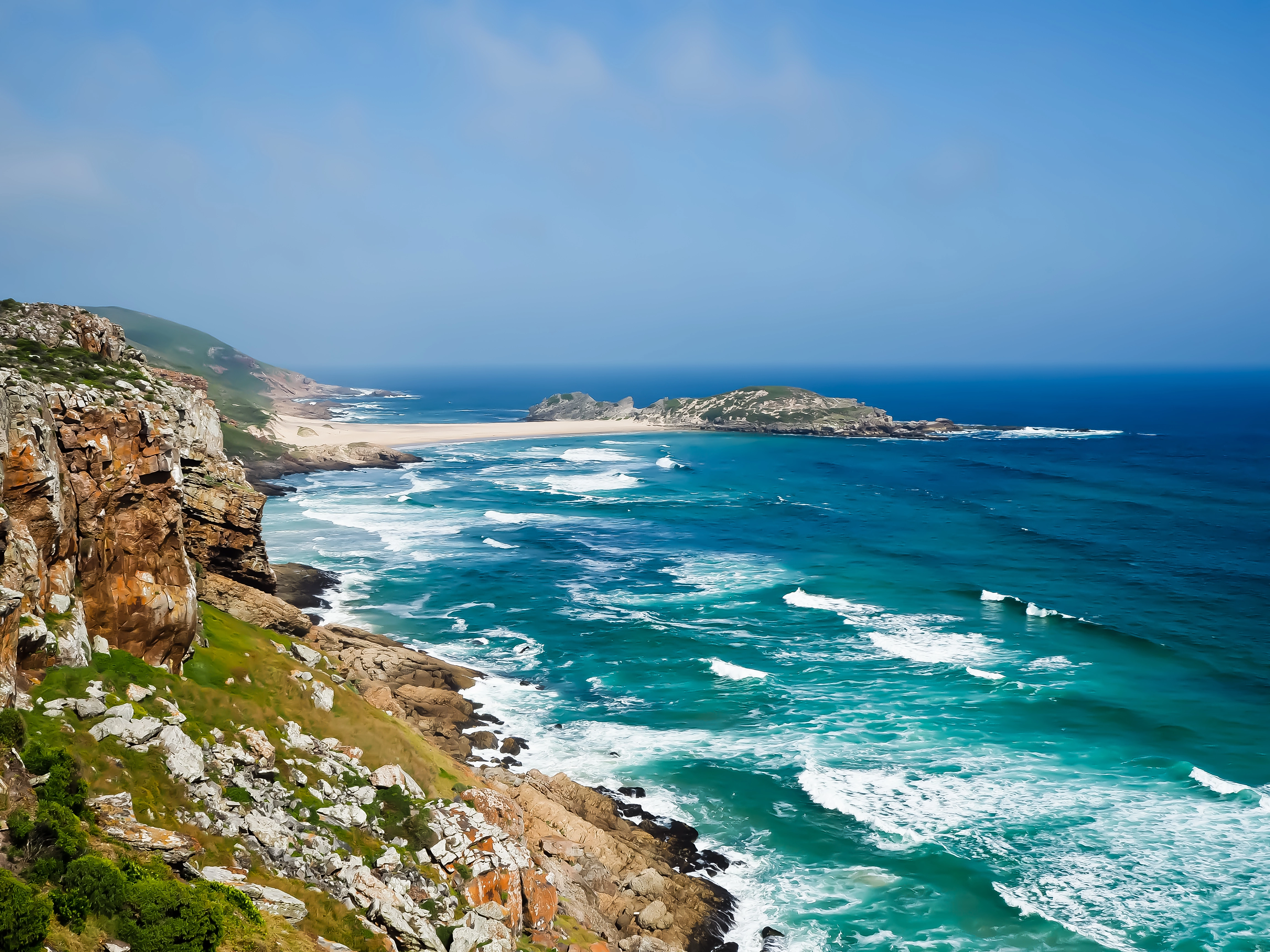
Beach formed on a wild, untamed rocky coastline

Beaches are the result of wave action by which waves or currents move sand or other loose sediments of which the beach is made as these particles are held in suspension. Alternatively, sand may be moved by saltation (a bouncing movement of large particles). Beach materials come from erosion of rocks offshore, as well as from headland erosion and slumping producing deposits of scree. A coral reef offshore is a significant source of sand particles. Some species of fish that feed on algae attached to coral outcrops and rocks can create substantial quantities of sand particles over their lifetime as they nibble during feeding, digesting the organic matter, and discarding the rock and coral particles which pass through their digestive tracts.

The composition of the beach depends upon the nature and quantity of sediments upstream of the beach, and the speed of flow and turbidity of water and wind. Sediments are moved by moving water and wind according to their particle size and state of compaction. Particles tend to settle and compact in still water. Once compacted, they are more resistant to erosion. Established vegetation (especially species with complex network root systems) will resist erosion by slowing the fluid flow at the surface layer. When affected by moving water or wind, particles that are eroded and held in suspension will increase the erosive power of the fluid that holds them by increasing the average density, viscosity, and volume of the moving fluid.

Coastlines facing very energetic wind and wave systems will tend to hold only large rocks as smaller particles will be held in suspension in the turbid water column and carried to calmer areas by longshore currents and tides. Coastlines that are protected from waves and winds will tend to allow finer sediments such as clay and mud to precipitate creating mud flats and mangrove forests. The shape of a beach depends on whether the waves are constructive or destructive, and whether the material is sand or shingle. Waves are constructive if the period between their wave crests is long enough for the breaking water to recede and the sediment to settle before the succeeding wave arrives and breaks.

Fine sediment transported from lower down the beach profile will compact if the receding water percolates or soaks into the beach. Compacted sediment is more resistant to movement by turbulent water from succeeding waves. Conversely, waves are destructive if the period between the wave crests is short. Sediment that remains in suspension when the following wave crest arrives will not be able to settle and compact and will be more susceptible to erosion by longshore currents and receding tides. The nature of sediments found on a beach tends to indicate the energy of the waves and wind in the locality.

Constructive waves move material up the beach while destructive waves move the material down the beach. During seasons when destructive waves are prevalent, the shallows will carry an increased load of sediment and organic matter in suspension. On sandy beaches, the turbulent backwash of destructive waves removes material forming a gently sloping beach. On pebble and shingle beaches the swash is dissipated more quickly because the large particle size allows greater percolation, thereby reducing the power of the backwash, and the beach remains steep. Compacted fine sediments will form a smooth beach surface that resists wind and water erosion.

During hot calm seasons, a crust may form on the surface of ocean beaches as the heat of the sun evaporates the water leaving the salt which crystallises around the sand particles. This crust forms an additional protective layer that resists wind erosion unless disturbed by animals or dissolved by the advancing tide. Cusps and horns form where incoming waves divide, depositing sand as horns and scouring out sand to form cusps. This forms the uneven face on some sand shorelines. White sand beaches look white because the quartz or eroded limestone in the sand reflects or scatters sunlight without significantly absorbing any colors.

=== Sand colors ===
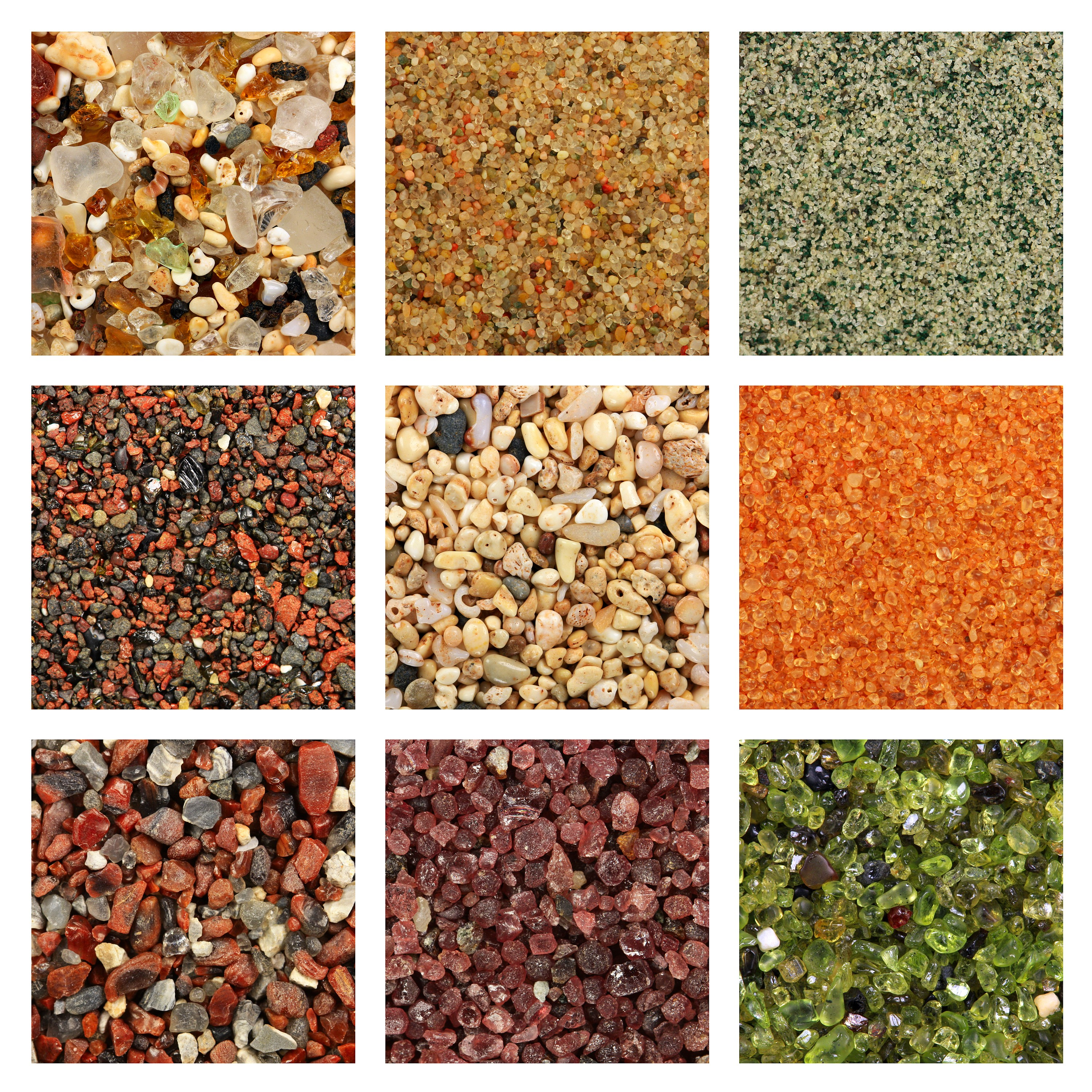
Depiction of sands: glass, dune, quartz volcanic, biogenic coral, pink coral volcanic, garnet, olivine

The composition of the sand varies depending on the local minerals and geology. Some of the types of sand found in beaches around the world are:

- White sand: Mostly made of quartz and limestone, it can also contain other minerals like feldspar and gypsum .
- Light-colored sand: This sand gets its color from quartz and iron, and is the most common sand color in Southern Europe and other regions of the Mediterranean Basin, such as Tunisia.
- Tropical white sand: On tropical islands, the sand is composed of calcium carbonate from the shells and skeletons of marine organisms, like corals and mollusks, as found in Aruba.
- Pink coral sand: Like the above, is composed of calcium carbonate and gets its pink hue from fragments of coral, such as in Bermuda and the Bahama Islands.
- Black sand: Black sand is composed of volcanic rock, like basalt and obsidian, which give it its gray-black color. Hawaii's Punaluu Beach, Madeira's Praia Formosa and Fuerteventura's Ajuy beach are examples of this type of sand.
- Red sand: This kind of sand is created by the oxidation of iron from volcanic rocks. Santorini's Kokkini Beach or the beaches on Prince Edward Island in Canada are examples of this kind of sand.
- Orange sand: Orange sand is high on iron. It can also be a combination of orange limestone, crushed shells, and volcanic deposits. Ramla Bay in Gozo, Malta or Porto Ferro in Sardinia are examples of each, respectively.
- Green sand: In this kind of sand, the mineral olivine has been separated from other volcanic fragments by erosive forces. A famous example is Hawaii's Papakolea Beach, which has sand containing basalt and coral fragments. Olivine beaches have a high potential for carbon sequestration, and artificial greensand beaches are being explored for this process by Project Vesta.
Types of beach sand
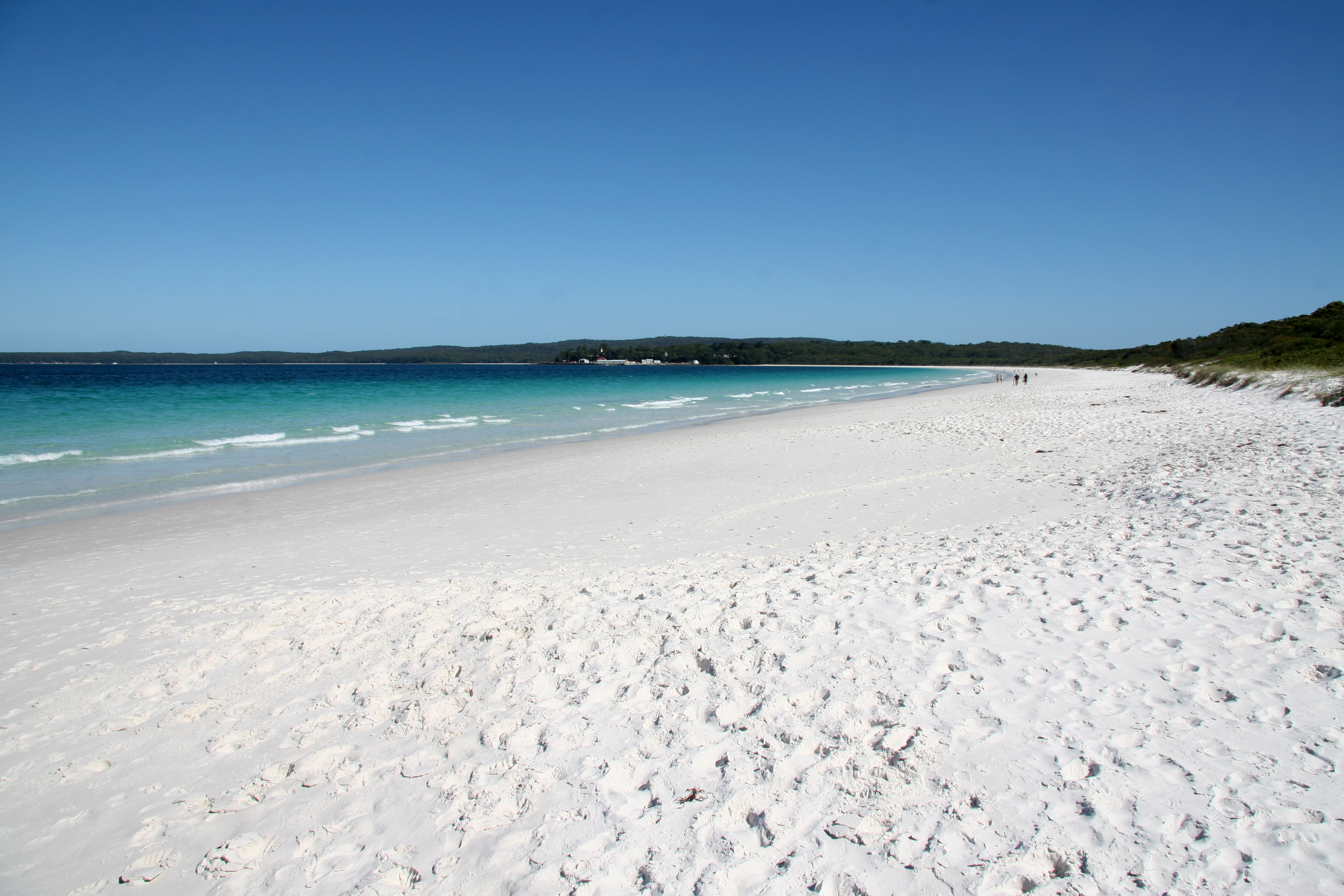
Fine, white sand made up of pure quartz in Hyams Beach, New South Wales, Australia.

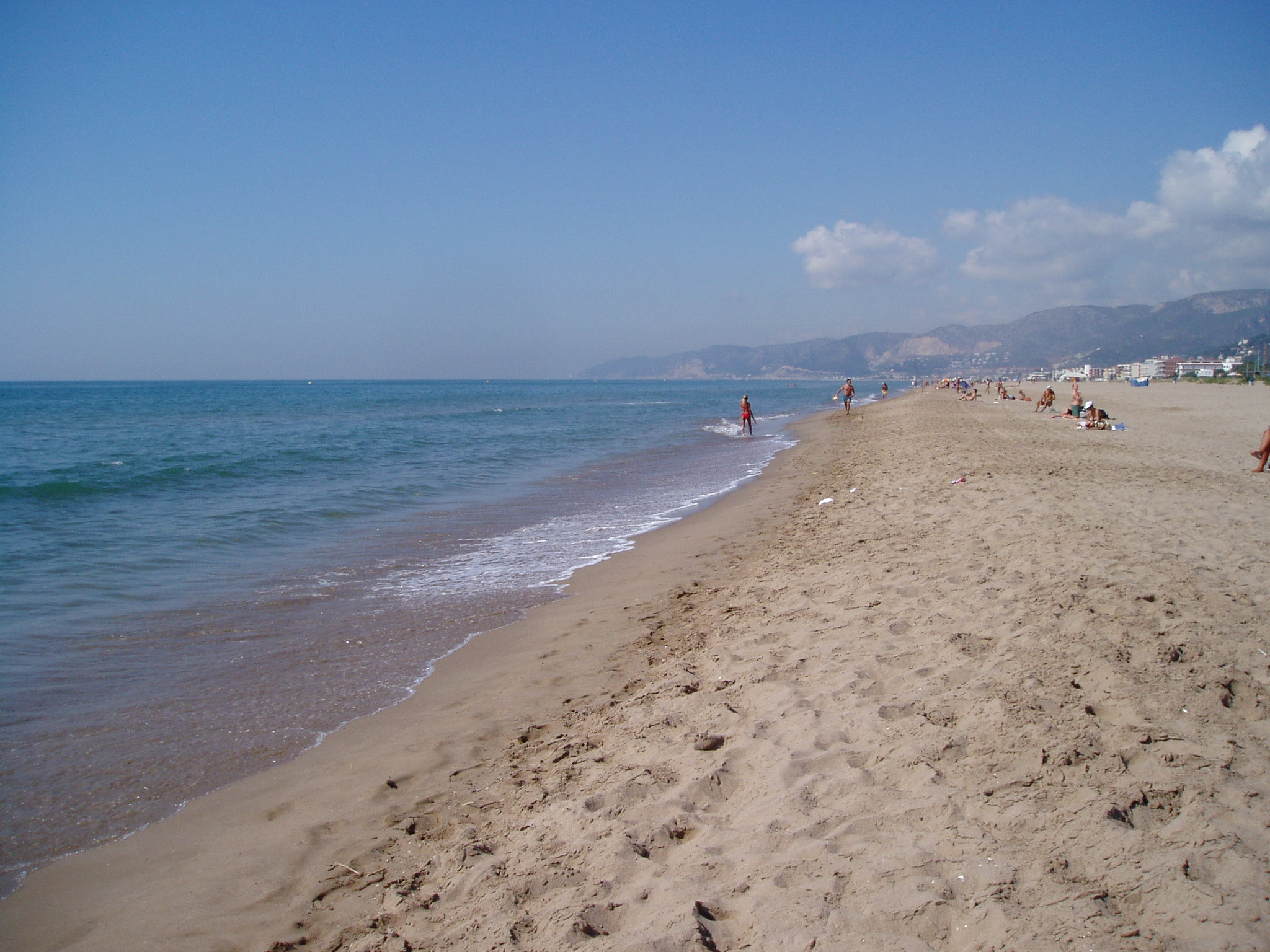
Yellow-colored sand in Castelldefels beach, Spain.

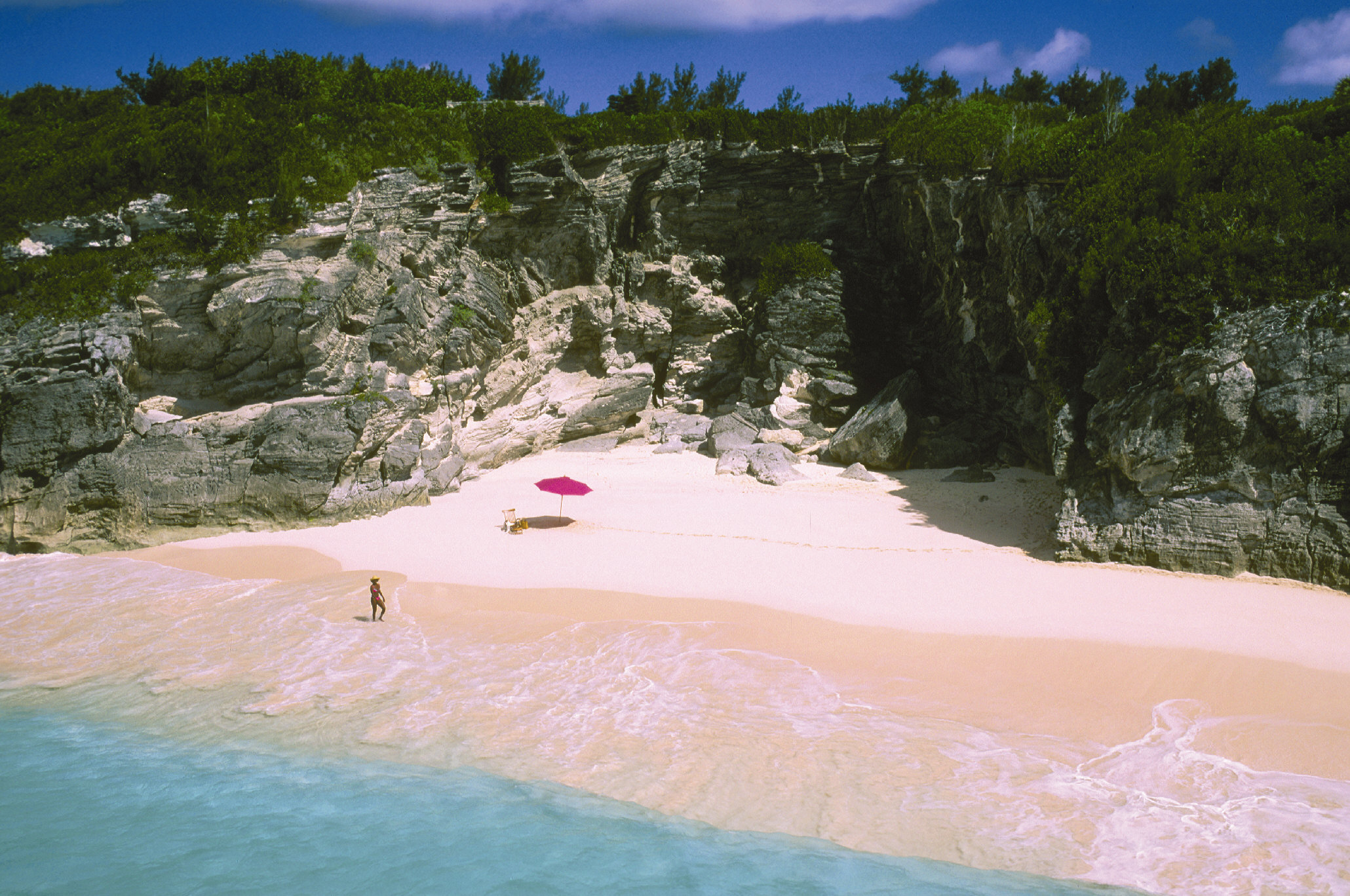
One of Bermuda's pink-sand beaches at Astwood Park.

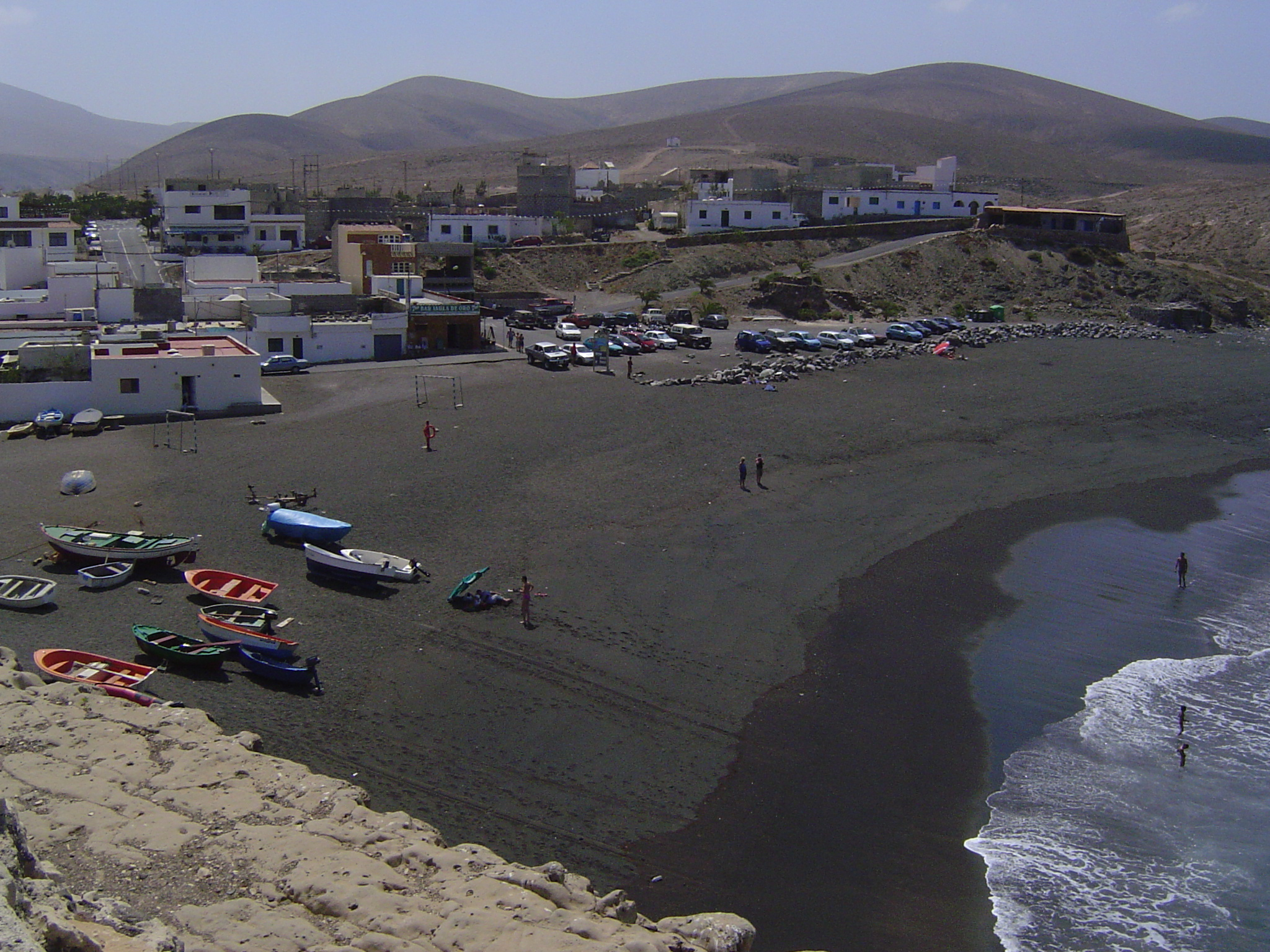
Ajuy's beach black sand.

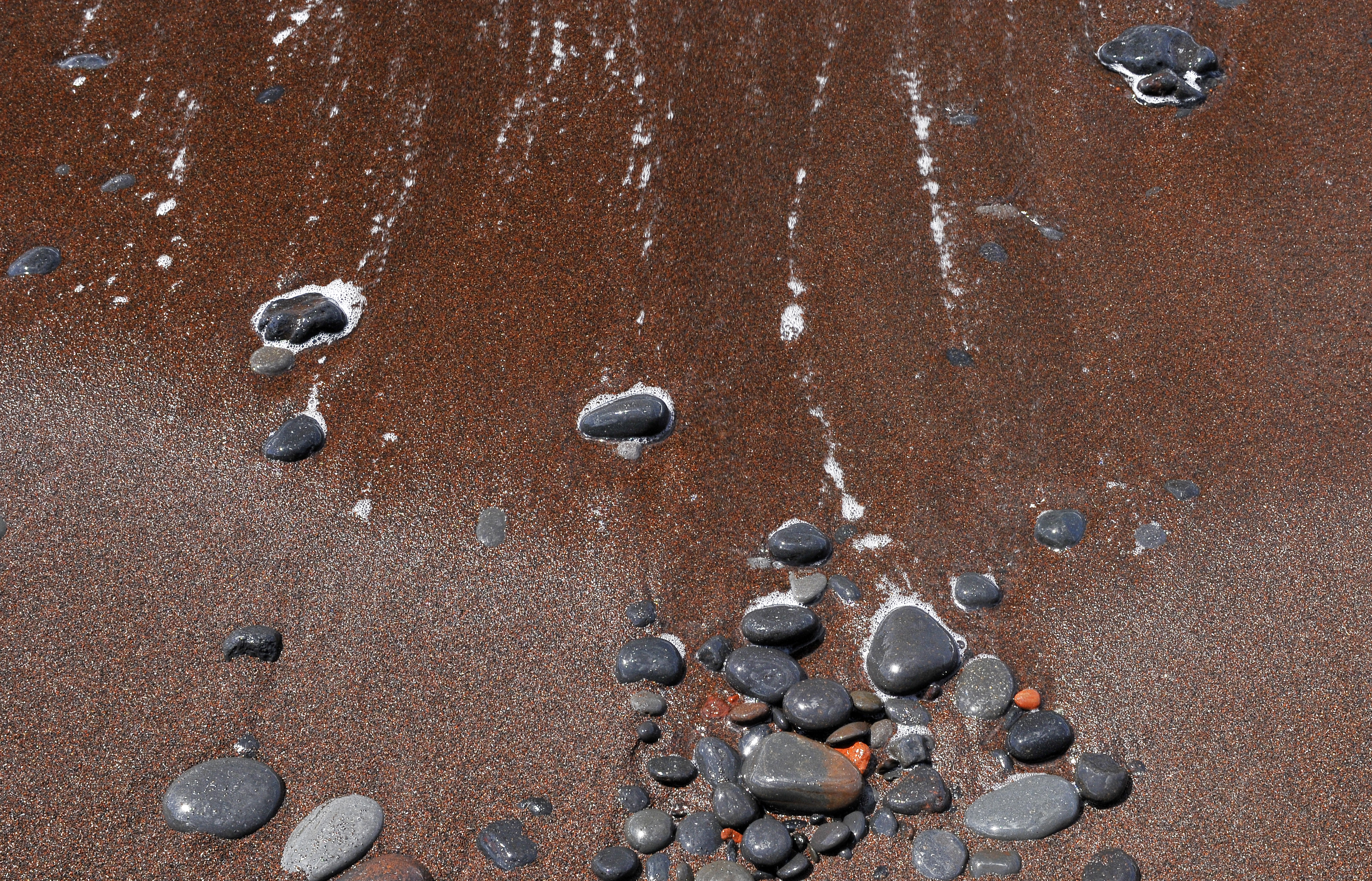
Red sand from Santorini's Kokkini beach.

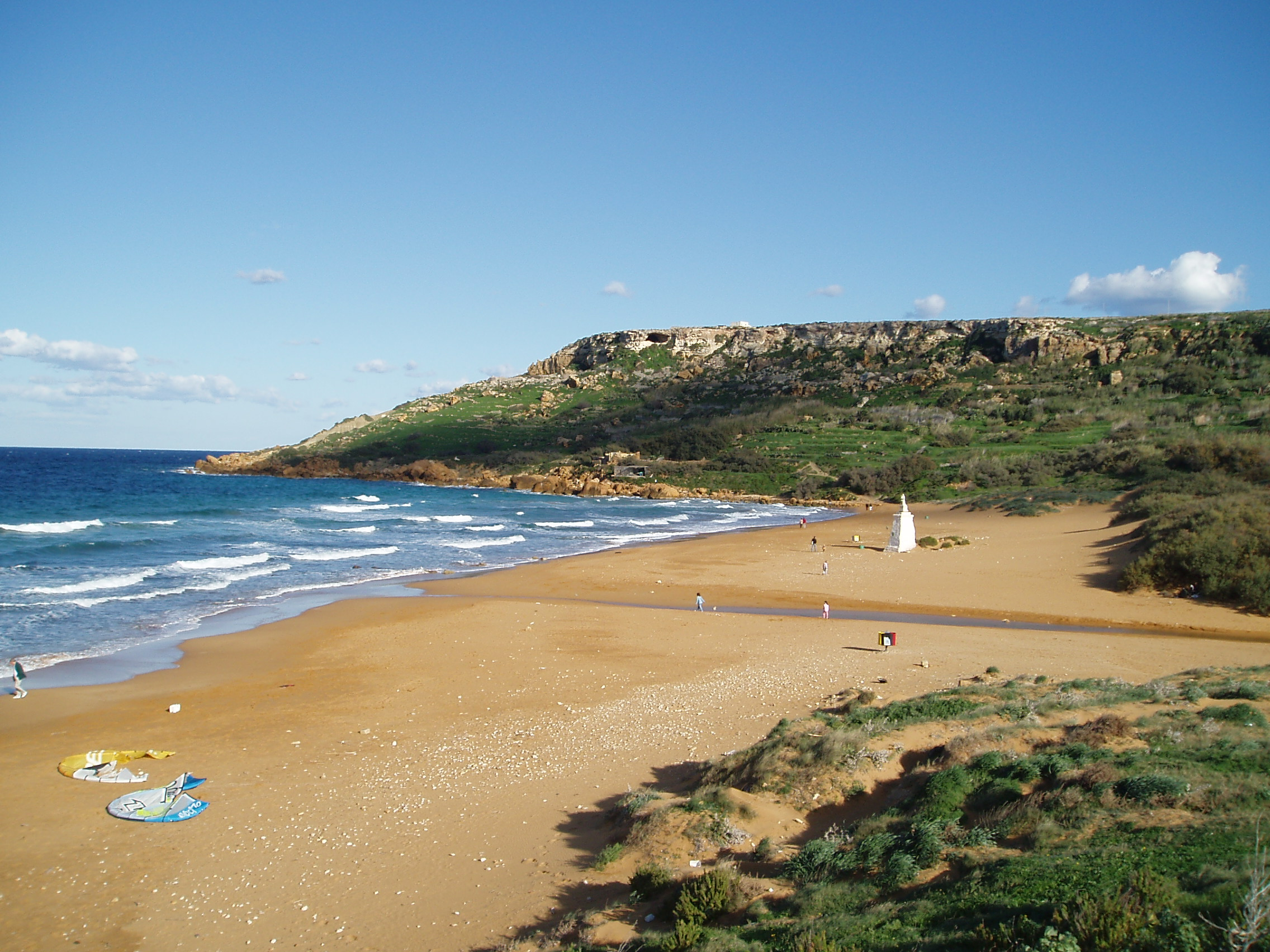
Orange sand from Ramla Bay, Malta

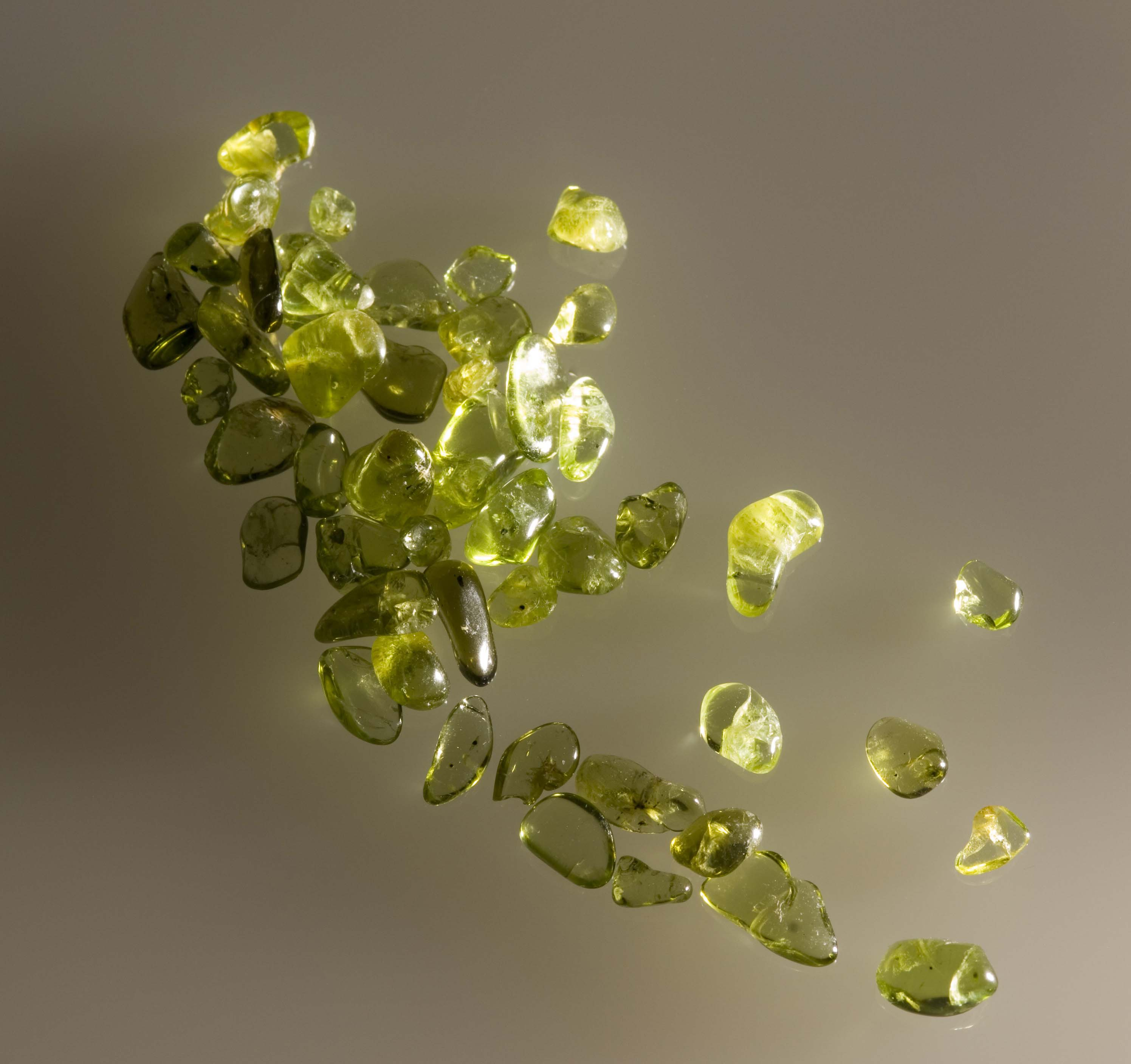
Close view of Papakolea Beach's green sand.

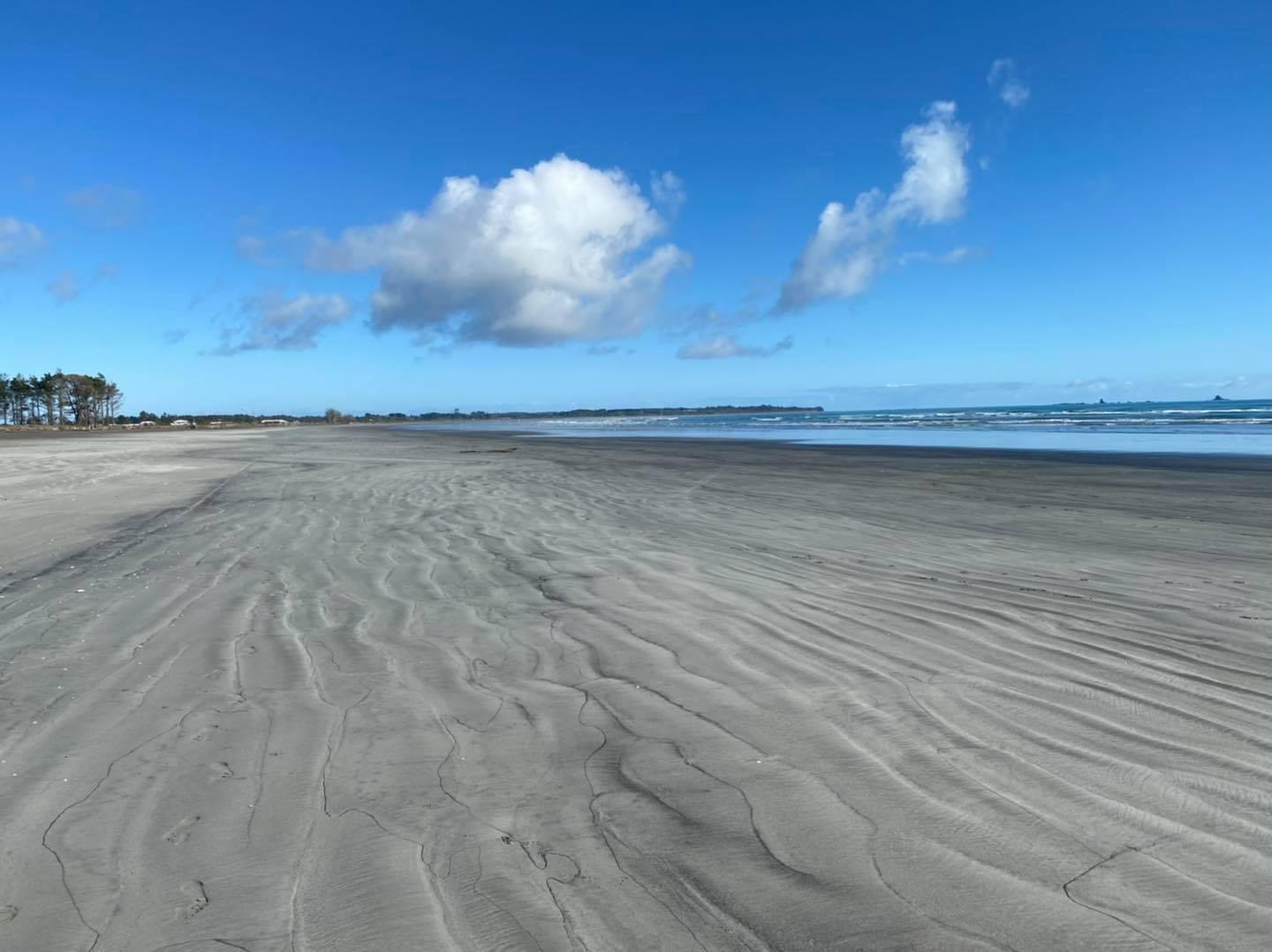
Grey sand at Carters Beach, New Zealand

== Erosion and accretion ==
=== Natural erosion and accretion ===
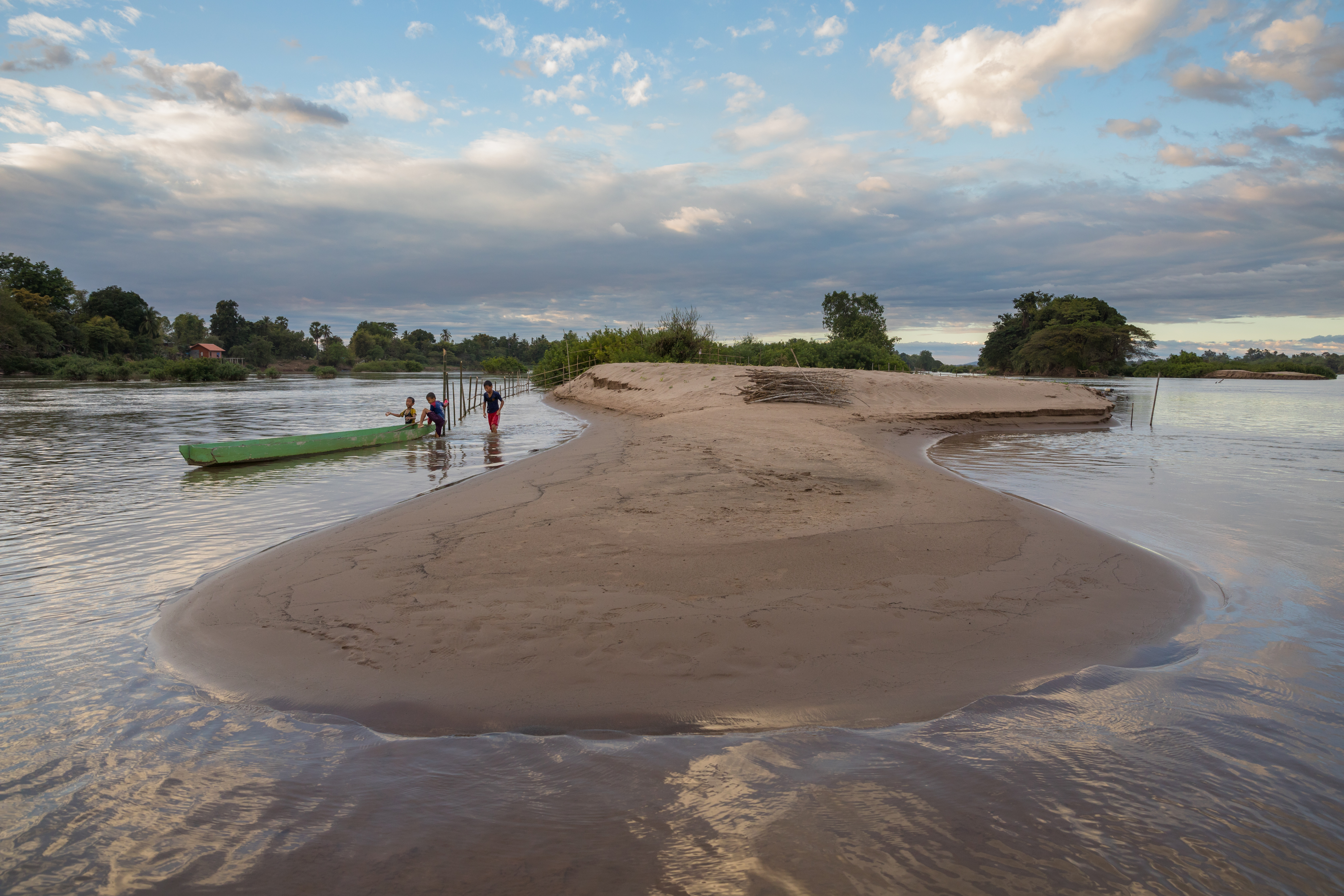
A sandspit can form if a beach suddenly changes direction.

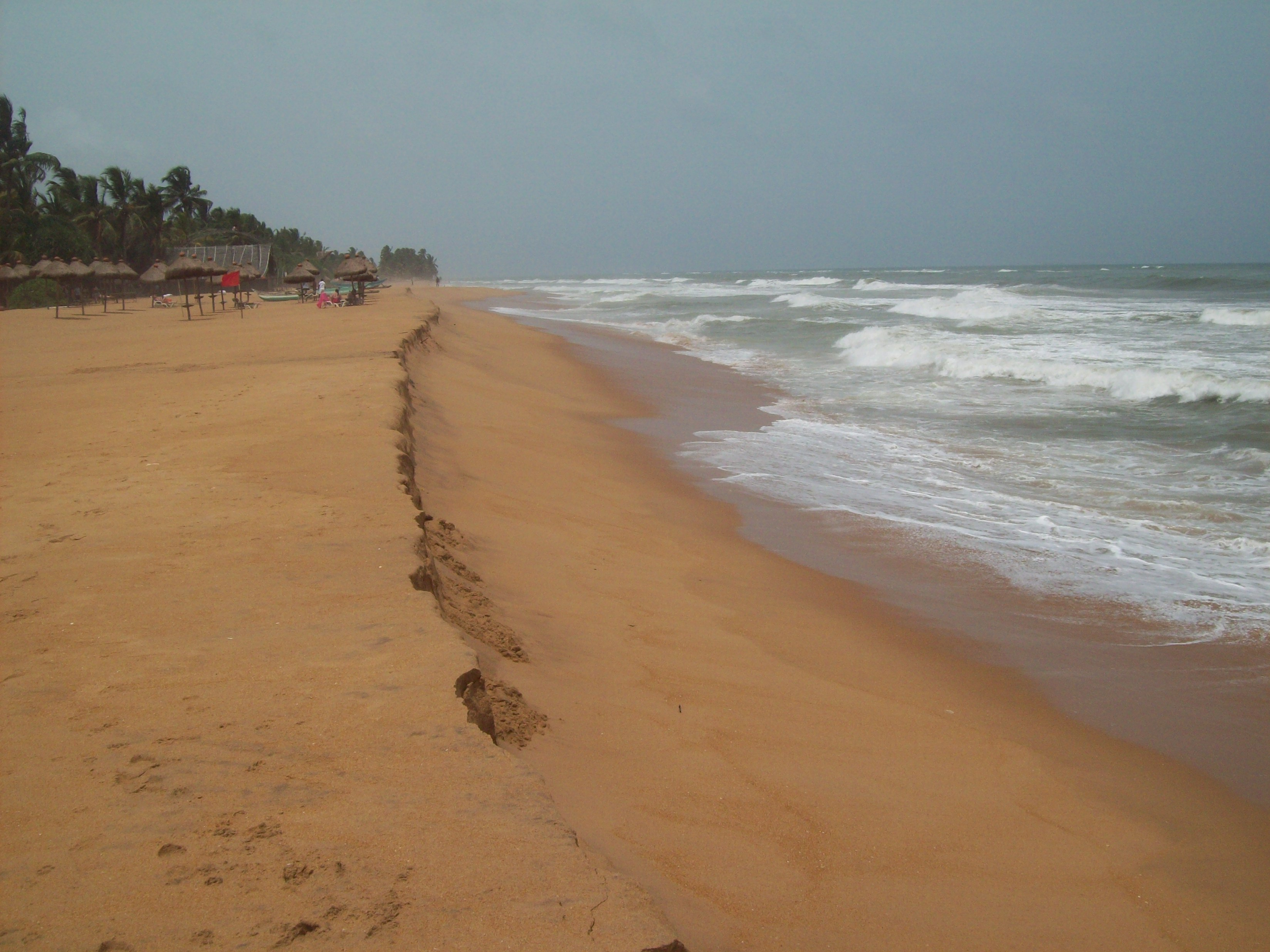
Beach erosion at Mount Lavinia, Sri Lanka

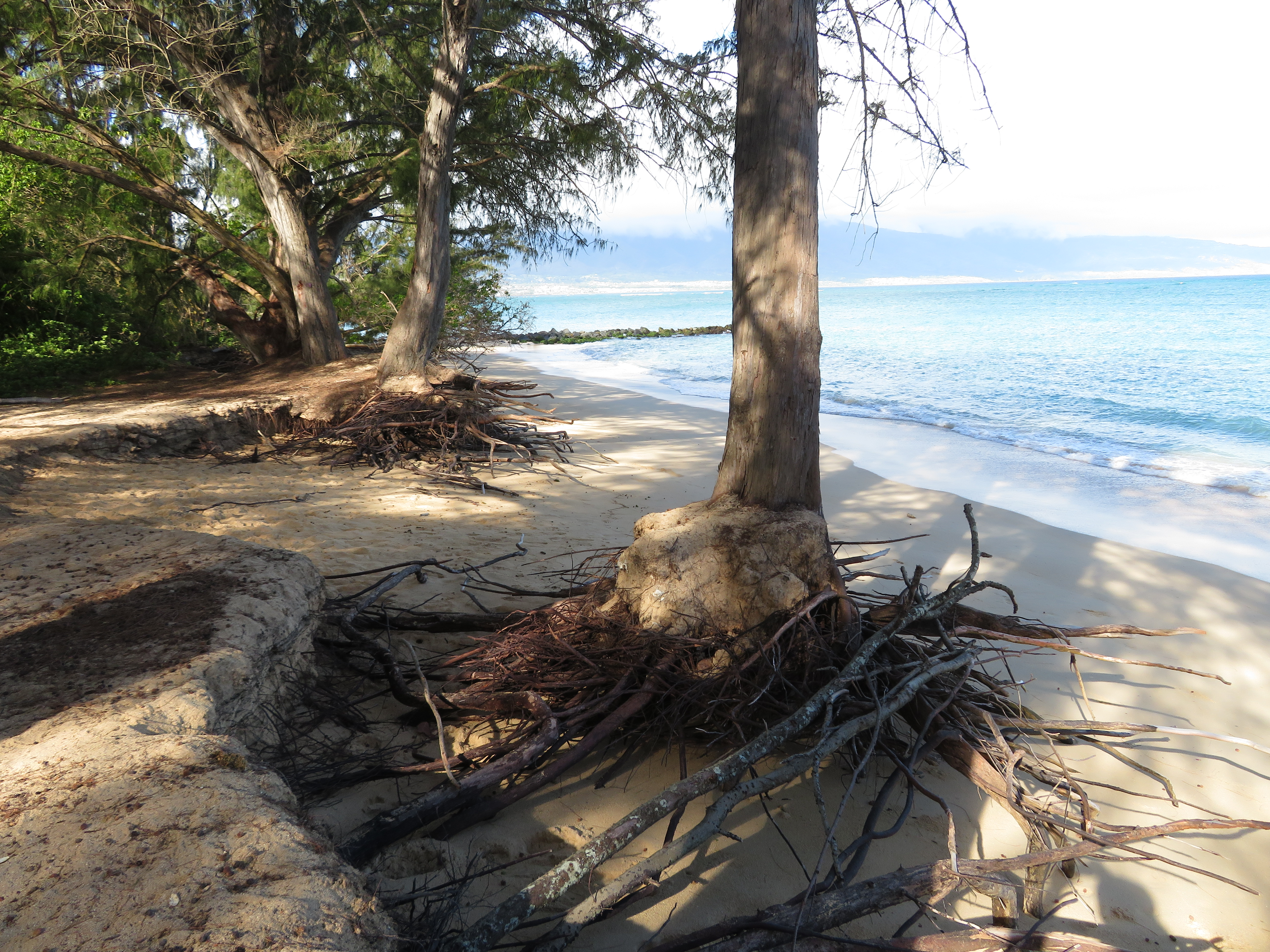
Tree roots exposed by shoreline erosion, Kanaha Beach, Maui

==== Causes ====
Beaches are changed in shape chiefly by the movement of water and wind. Any weather event that is associated with turbid or fast-flowing water or high winds will erode exposed beaches. Longshore currents will tend to replenish beach sediments and repair storm damage. Tidal waterways generally change the shape of their adjacent beaches by small degrees with every tidal cycle. Over time these changes can become substantial leading to significant changes in the size and location of the beach.

==== Effects on flora ====
Changes in the shape of the beach may undermine the roots of large trees and other flora. Many beach adapted species (such as coconut palms) have a fine root system and large root ball which tends to withstand wave and wind action and tends to stabilize beaches better than other trees with a lesser root ball.

==== Effects on adjacent land ====
Erosion of beaches can expose less resilient soils and rocks to wind and wave action leading to undermining of coastal headlands eventually resulting in catastrophic collapse of large quantities of overburden into the shallows. This material may be distributed along the beach front leading to a change in the habitat as sea grasses and corals in the shallows may be buried or deprived of light and nutrients.

=== Humanmade erosion and accretion ===
Coastal areas settled by man inevitably become subject to the effects of human-made structures and processes. Over long periods of time, these influences may substantially alter the shape of the coastline, and the character of the beach.

==== Destruction of flora ====
Beachfront flora plays a major role in stabilizing the foredunes and preventing beach head erosion and inland movement of dunes. If flora with network root systems (creepers, grasses, and palms) are able to become established, they provide an effective coastal defense as they trap sand particles and rainwater and enrich the surface layer of the dunes, allowing other plant species to become established. They also protect the berm from erosion by high winds, freak waves and subsiding floodwaters.

Over long periods of time, well-stabilized foreshore areas will tend to accrete, while unstabilized foreshores will tend to erode, leading to substantial changes in the shape of the coastline. These changes usually occur over periods of many years. Freak wave events such as tsunami, tidal waves, and storm surges may substantially alter the shape, profile and location of a beach within hours.

Destruction of flora on the berm by the use of herbicides, excessive pedestrian or vehicle traffic, or disruption to freshwater flows may lead to erosion of the berm and dunes. While the destruction of flora may be a gradual process that is imperceptible to regular beach users, it often becomes immediately apparent after storms associated with high winds and freak wave events that can rapidly move large volumes of exposed and unstable sand, depositing them further inland, or carrying them out into the permanent water forming offshore bars, lagoons or increasing the area of the beach exposed at low tide. Large and rapid movements of exposed sand can bury and smother flora in adjacent areas, aggravating the loss of habitat for fauna, and enlarging the area of instability. If there is an adequate supply of sand, and weather conditions do not allow vegetation to recover and stabilize the sediment, wind-blown sand can continue to advance, engulfing and permanently altering downwind landscapes.

Sediment moved by waves or receding floodwaters can be deposited in coastal shallows, engulfing reed beds and changing the character of underwater flora and fauna in the coastal shallows.

Burning or clearance of vegetation on the land adjacent to the beach head, for farming and residential development, changes the surface wind patterns, and exposes the surface of the beach to wind erosion.

Farming and residential development are also commonly associated with changes in local surface water flows. If these flows are concentrated in stormwater drains emptying onto the beach head, they may erode the beach creating a lagoon or delta.

Dense vegetation tends to absorb rainfall reducing the speed of runoff and releasing it over longer periods of time. Destruction by burning or clearance of the natural vegetation tends to increase the speed and erosive power of runoff from rainfall. This runoff will tend to carry more silt and organic matter from the land onto the beach and into the sea. If the flow is constant, runoff from cleared land arriving at the beach head will tend to deposit this material into the sand changing its color, odor and fauna.

==== Creation of beach access points ====
The concentration of pedestrian and vehicular traffic accessing the beach for recreational purposes may cause increased erosion at the access points if measures are not taken to stabilize the beach surface above high-water mark. Recognition of the dangers of loss of beach front flora has caused many local authorities responsible for managing coastal areas to restrict beach access points by physical structures or legal sanctions, and fence off foredunes in an effort to protect the flora. These measures are often associated with the construction of structures at these access points to allow traffic to pass over or through the dunes without causing further damage.

==== Concentration of runoff ====
Beaches provide a filter for runoff from the coastal plain. If the runoff is naturally dispersed along the beach, water borne silt and organic matter will be retained on the land and will feed the flora in the coastal area. Runoff that is dispersed along the beach will tend to percolate through the beach and may emerge from the beach at low tide.

The retention of the freshwater may also help to maintain underground water reserves and will resist salt water incursion. If the surface flow of the runoff is diverted and concentrated by drains that create constant flows over the beach above the sea or river level, the beach will be eroded and ultimately form an inlet unless longshore flows deposit sediments to repair the breach.

Once eroded, an inlet may allow tidal inflows of salt water to pollute areas inland from the beach and may also affect the quality of underground water supplies and the height of the water table.

==== Deprivation of runoff ====
Some flora naturally occurring on the beach head requires freshwater runoff from the land. Diversion of freshwater runoff into drains may deprive these plants of their water supplies and allow sea water incursion, increasing the saltiness of the groundwater. Species that are not able to survive in salt water may die and be replaced by mangroves or other species adapted to salty environments.

==== Inappropriate beach nourishment ====
Beach nourishment is the importing and deposition of sand or other sediments in an effort to restore a beach that has been damaged by erosion. Beach nourishment often involves excavation of sediments from riverbeds or sand quarries. This excavated sediment may be substantially different in size and appearance to the naturally occurring beach sand.

In extreme cases, beach nourishment may involve placement of large pebbles or rocks in an effort to permanently restore a shoreline subject to constant erosion and loss of foreshore. This is often required where the flow of new sediment caused by the longshore current has been disrupted by construction of harbors, breakwaters, causeways or boat ramps, creating new current flows that scour the sand from behind these structures and deprive the beach of restorative sediments. If the causes of the erosion are not addressed, beach nourishment can become a necessary and permanent feature of beach maintenance.

During beach nourishment activities, care must be taken to place new sediments so that the new sediments compact and stabilize before aggressive wave or wind action can erode them. Material that is concentrated too far down the beach may form a temporary groyne that will encourage scouring behind it. Sediments that are too fine or too light may be eroded before they have compacted or been integrated into the established vegetation. Foreign unwashed sediments may introduce flora or fauna that are not usually found in that locality.

Brighton Beach, on the south coast of England, is a shingle beach that has been nourished with very large pebbles in an effort to withstand the erosion of the upper area of the beach. These large pebbles made the beach unwelcoming for pedestrians for a period of time until natural processes integrated the naturally occurring shingle into the pebble base.

== Use for recreation ==
=== History ===
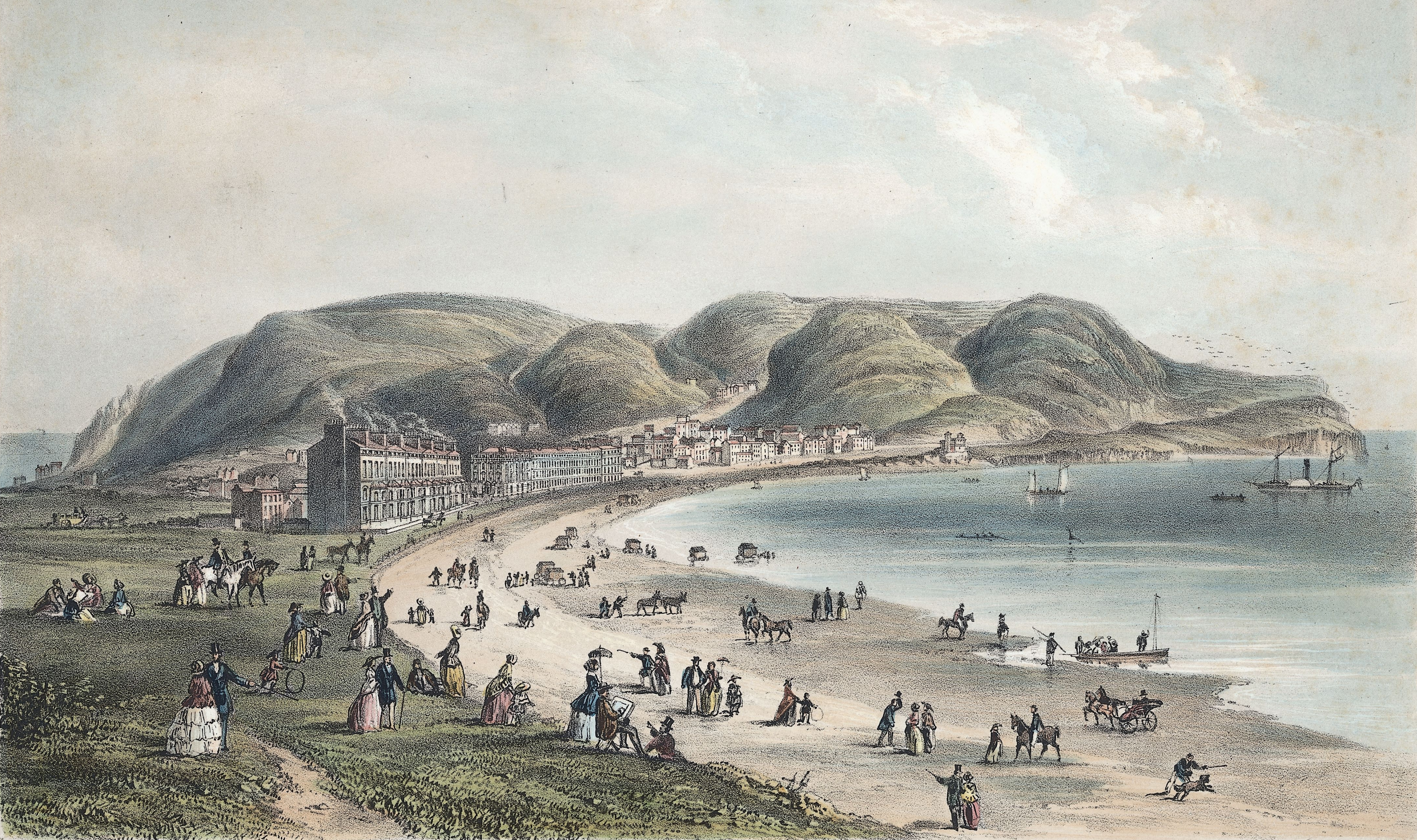
A popular Victorian seaside resort. Llandudno, 1856

Even in Roman times, wealthy people spent their free time on the coast. They also built large villa complexes with bathing facilities (so-called maritime villas) in particularly beautiful locations. Excavations of Roman architecture can still be found today, for example on the Amalfi Coast near Naples and in Barcola in Trieste.

The development of the beach as a popular leisure resort from the mid-19th century was the first manifestation of what is now the global tourist industry. The first seaside resorts were opened in the 18th century for the aristocracy, who began to frequent the seaside as well as the then fashionable spa towns, for recreation and health. One of the earliest such seaside resorts, was Scarborough in Yorkshire during the 1720s; it had been a fashionable spa town since a stream of acidic water was discovered running from one of the cliffs to the south of the town in the 17th century. The first rolling bathing machines were introduced by 1735.

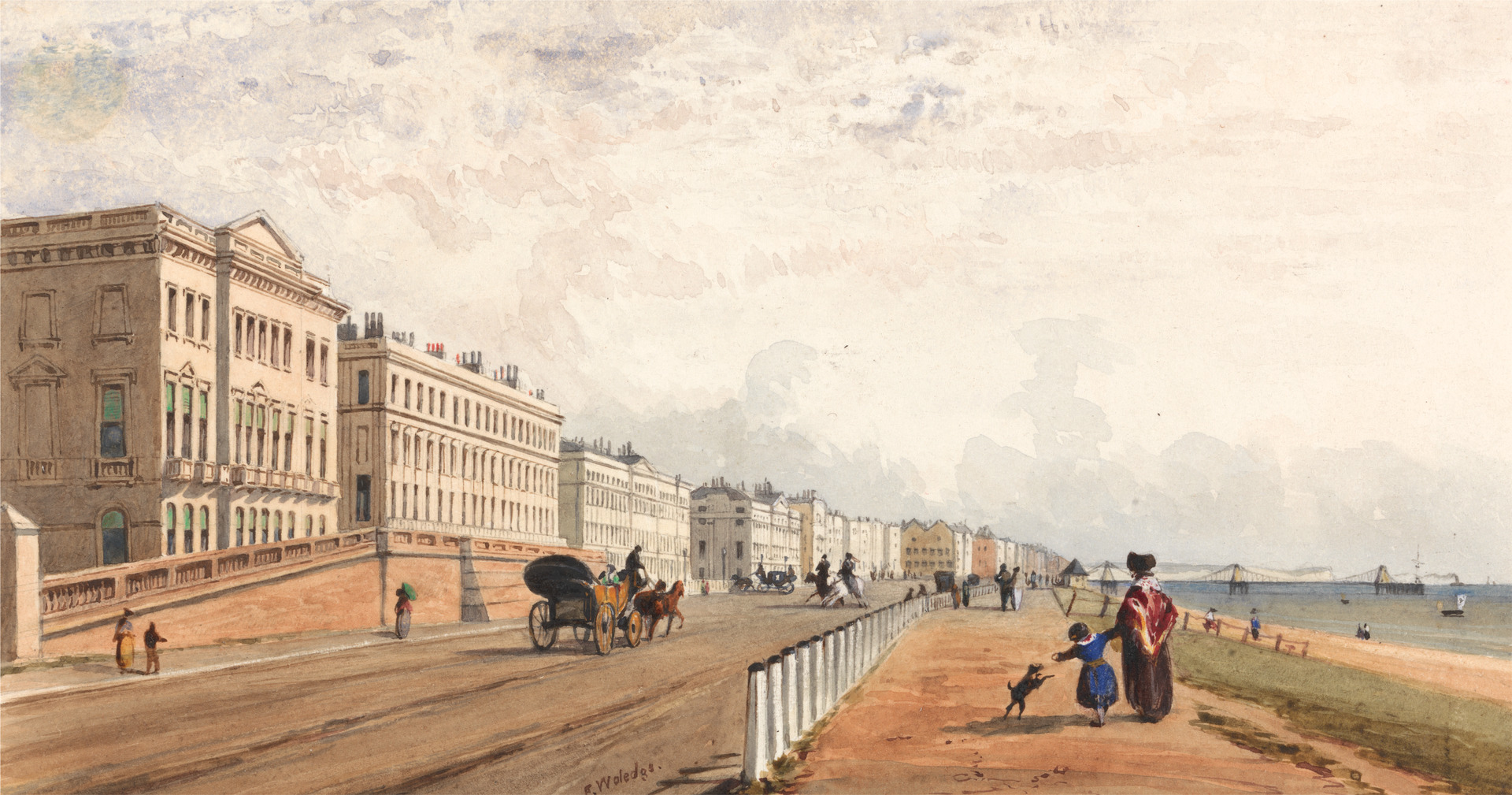
Brighton, The Front and the Chain Pier Seen in the Distance, early 19th century

The opening of the resort in Brighton and its reception of royal patronage from King George IV, extended the seaside as a resort for health and pleasure to the much larger London market, and the beach became a centre for upper-class pleasure and frivolity. This trend was praised and artistically elevated by the new romantic ideal of the picturesque landscape; Jane Austen's unfinished novel Sanditon is an example of that. Later, Queen Victoria's long-standing patronage of the Isle of Wight and Ramsgate in Kent ensured that a seaside residence was considered as a highly fashionable possession for those wealthy enough to afford more than one home.

==== Seaside resorts for the working class ====
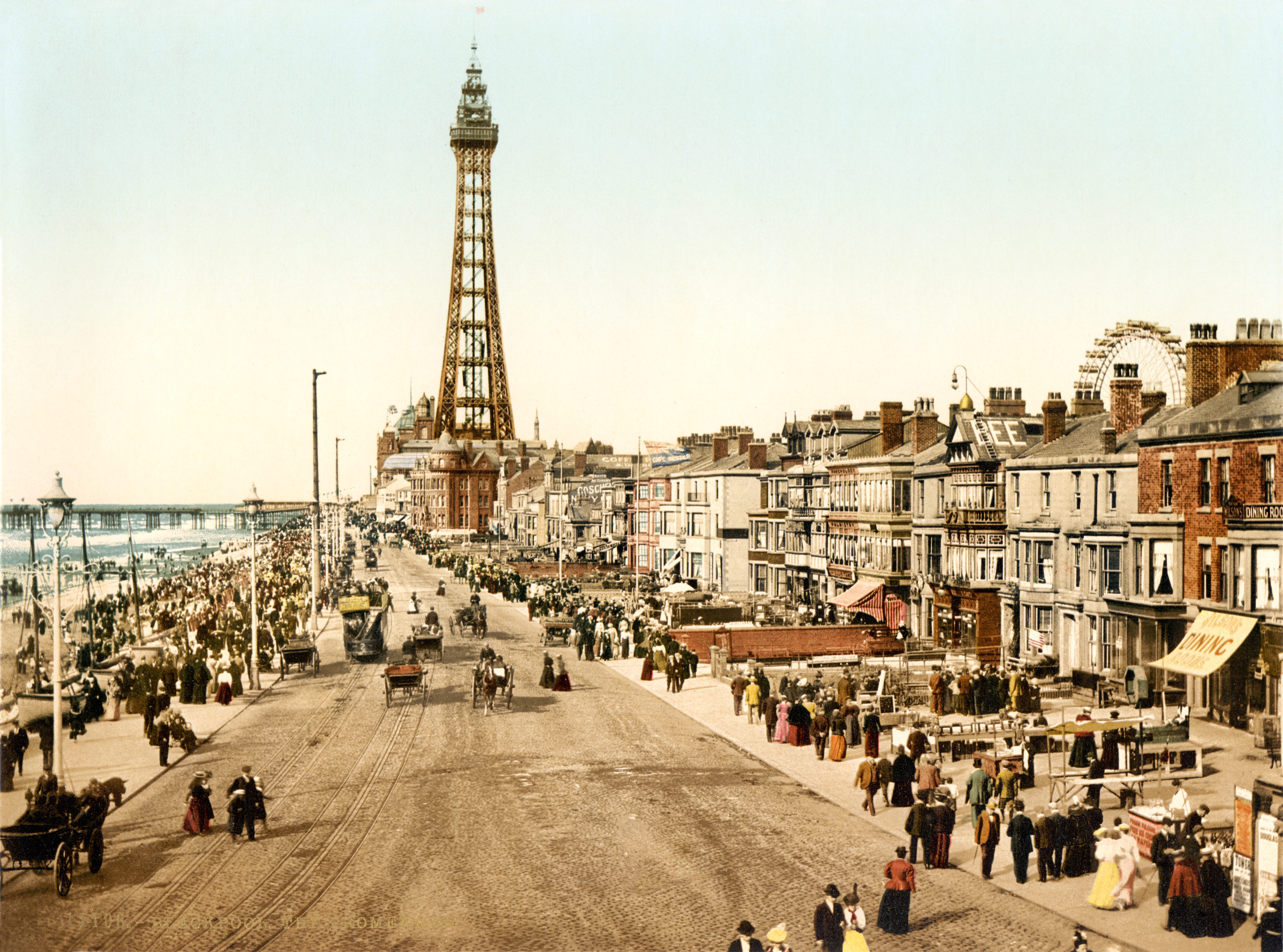
Blackpool Promenade c. 1898

The extension of this form of leisure to the middle and working classes began with the development of the railways in the 1840s, which offered cheap fares to fast-growing resort towns. In particular, the completion of a branch line to the small seaside town of Blackpool from Poulton led to a sustained economic and demographic boom. A sudden influx of visitors, arriving by rail, led entrepreneurs to build accommodation and create new attractions, leading to more visitors and a rapid cycle of growth throughout the 1850s and 1860s.

The growth was intensified by the practice among the Lancashire cotton mill owners of closing the factories for a week every year to service and repair machinery. These became known as wakes weeks. Each town's mills would close for a different week, allowing Blackpool to manage a steady and reliable stream of visitors over a prolonged period in the summer. A prominent feature of the resort was the promenade and the pleasure piers, where an eclectic variety of performances vied for the people's attention. In 1863, the North Pier in Blackpool was completed, rapidly becoming a centre of attraction for upper class visitors. Central Pier was completed in 1868, with a theatre and a large open-air dance floor.

Many of the popular beach resorts were equipped with bathing machines, because even the all-covering beachwear of the period was considered immodest. By the end of the century the English coastline had over 100 large resort towns, some with populations exceeding 50,000.

==== Expansion around the world ====
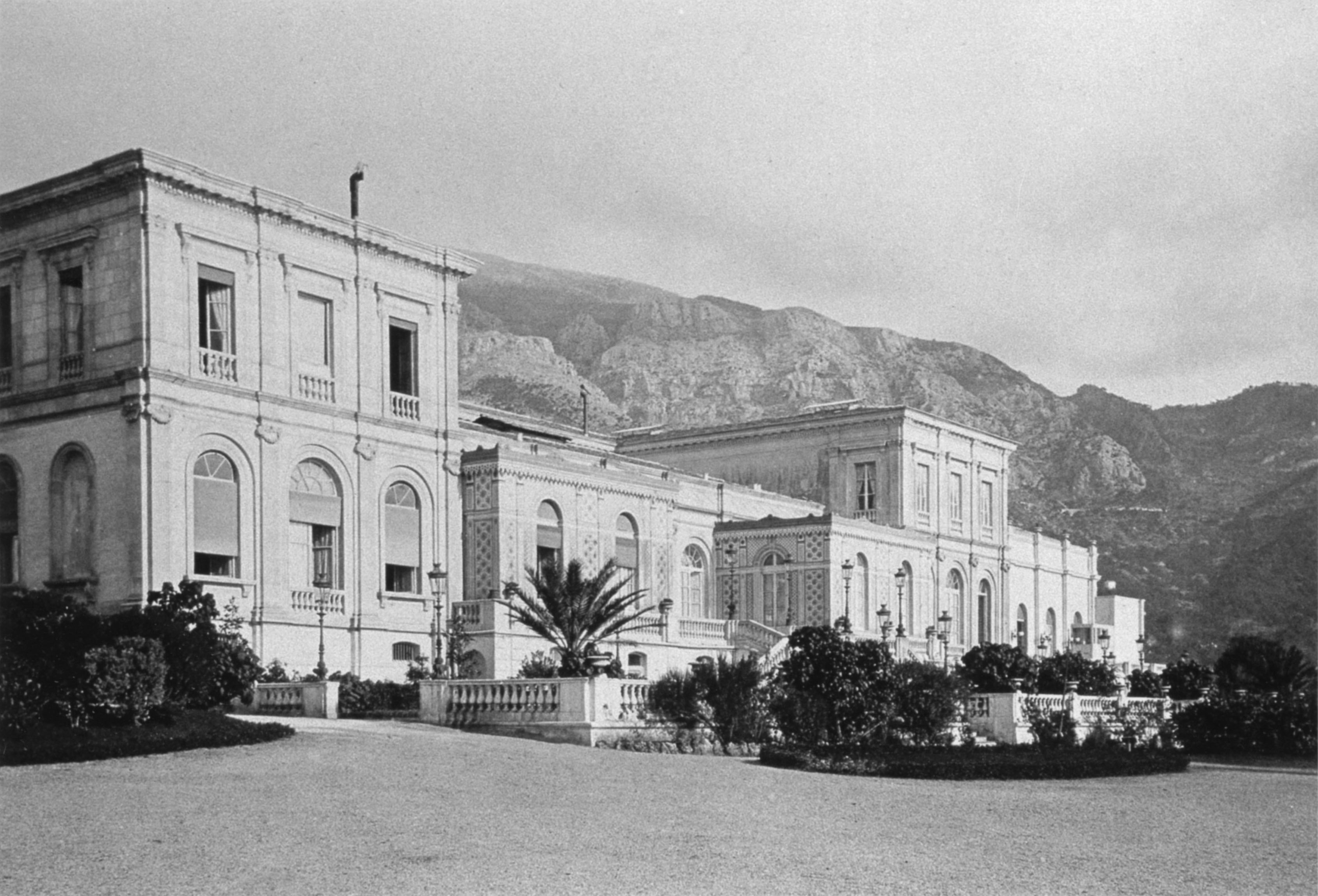
Seaside facade at Monte Carlo, 1870s

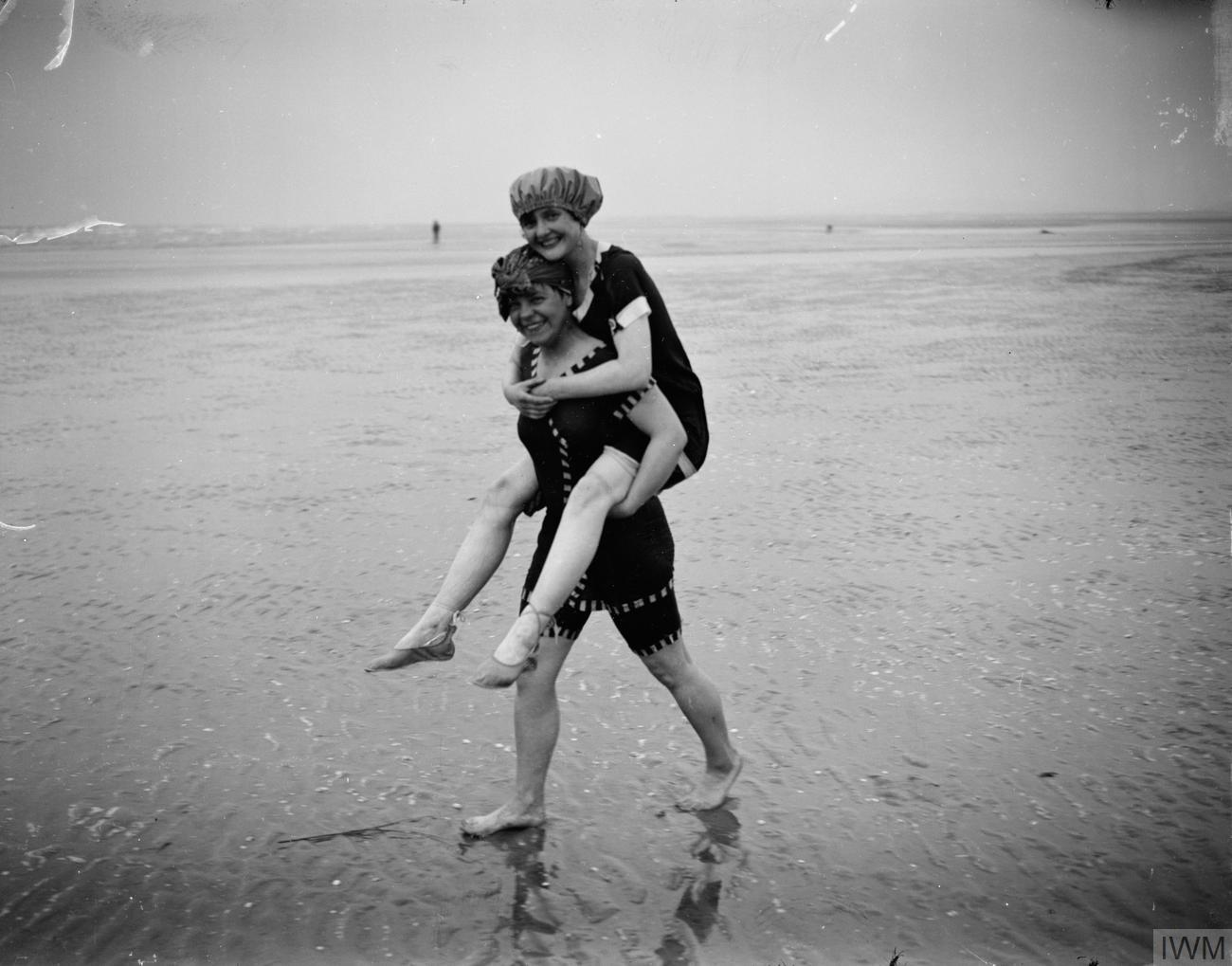
British beachgoers at Le Touquet, France, 1918

The development of the seaside resort abroad was stimulated by the well-developed English love of the beach. The French Riviera alongside the Mediterranean had already become a popular destination for the British upper class by the end of the 18th century. In 1864, the first railway to Nice was completed, making the Riviera accessible to visitors from all over Europe. By 1874, residents of foreign enclaves in Nice, most of whom were British, numbered 25,000. The coastline became renowned for attracting the royalty of Europe, including Queen Victoria and King Edward VII.

Continental European attitudes towards gambling and nakedness tended to be more lax than in Britain, so British and French entrepreneurs were quick to exploit the possibilities. In 1863, Charles III, Prince of Monaco, and François Blanc, a French businessman, arranged for steamships and carriages to take visitors from Nice to Monaco, where large luxury hotels, gardens and casinos were built. This area of Monaco was then renamed Monte Carlo after prince Charles III.

Commercial sea bathing spread to the United States and parts of the British Empire by the end of the 19th century. The first public beach in the United States was Revere Beach, which opened in 1896. During that same time, Henry Flagler developed the Florida East Coast Railway, which linked the coastal sea resorts developing at St. Augustine, FL and Miami Beach, FL, to winter travelers from the northern United States and Canada on the East Coast Railway. By the early 20th century surfing was developed in Hawaii and Australia; it spread to southern California by the early 1960s. By the 1970s cheap and affordable air travel led to the growth of a truly global tourism market which benefited areas such as the Mediterranean, Australia, South Africa, and the coastal Sun Belt regions of the United States.

=== Today ===
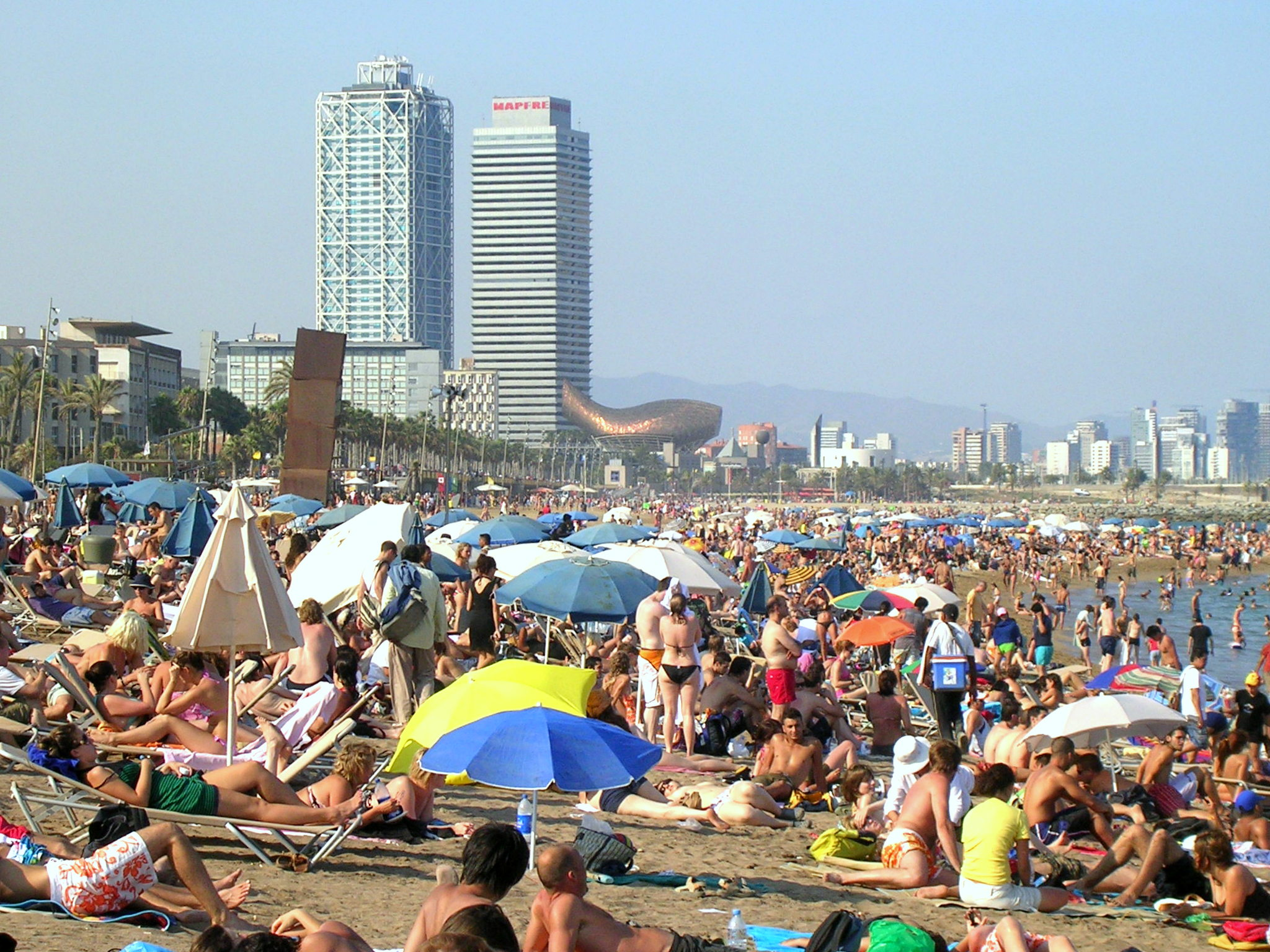
Tourists at the Mediterranean Sea beach of Barcelona, 2007

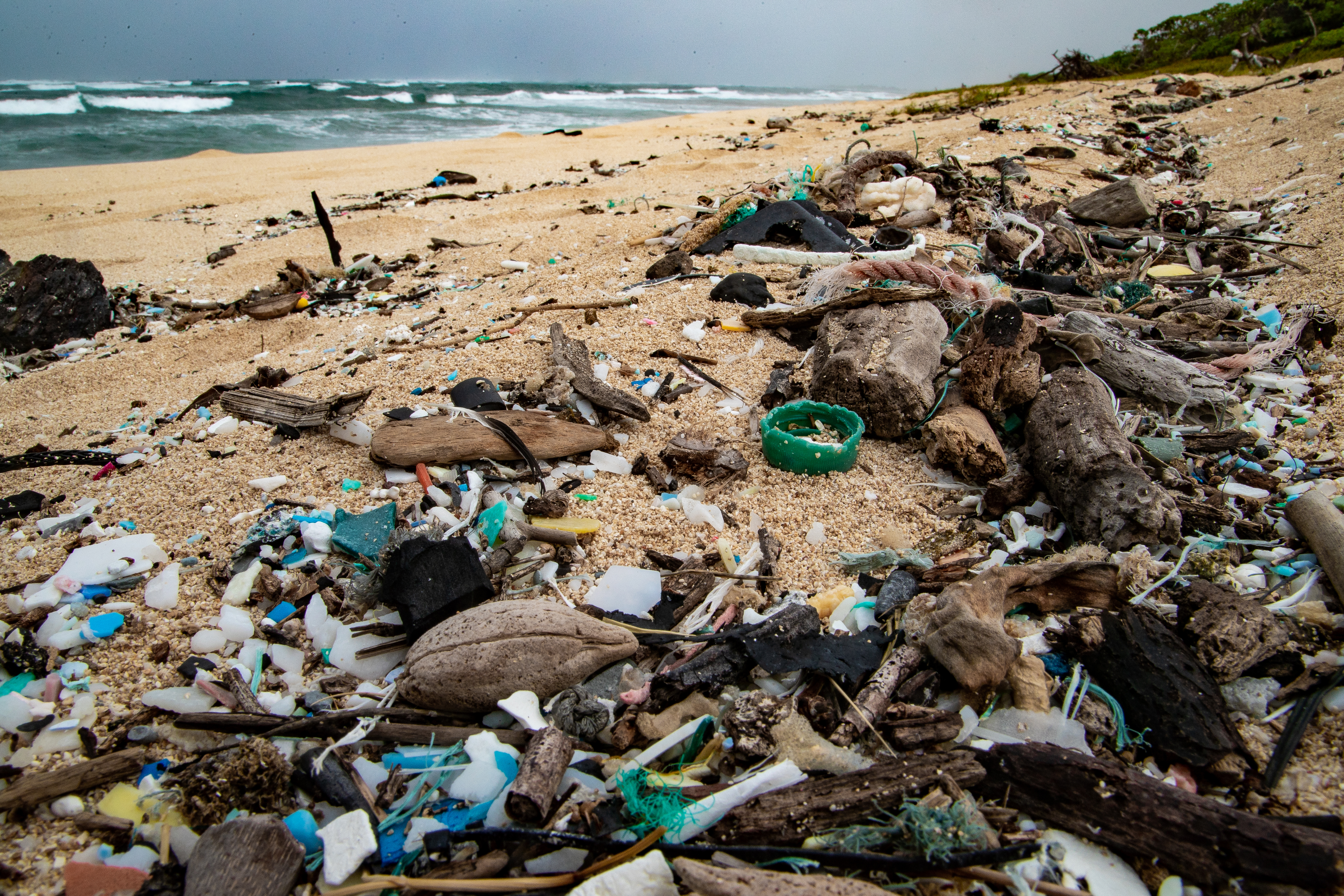
Marine debris on a beach in Hawaii.

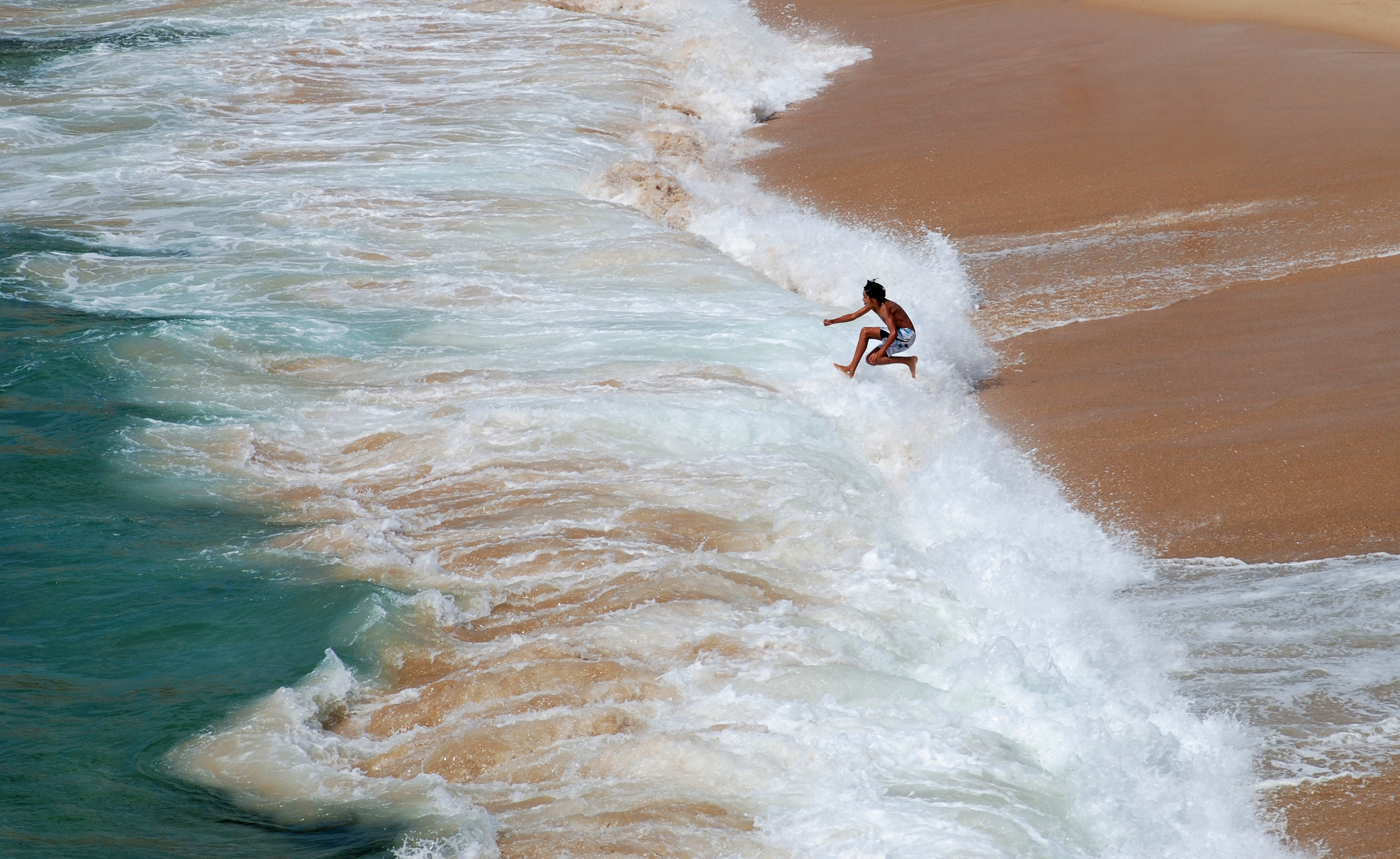
Playing in the surf is a popular recreational activity.

Beaches can be popular on warm sunny days. In the Victorian era, many popular beach resorts were equipped with bathing machines because even the all-covering beachwear of the period was considered immodest. This social standard still prevails in many Muslim countries. At the other end of the spectrum are topfree beaches and nude beaches where clothing is optional or not allowed. In most countries social norms are significantly different on a beach in hot weather, compared to adjacent areas where similar behavior might not be tolerated and might even be prosecuted.

In more than thirty countries in Europe, South Africa, New Zealand, Canada, Costa Rica, South America and the Caribbean, the best recreational beaches are awarded Blue Flag status, based on such criteria as water quality and safety provision. Subsequent loss of this status can have a severe effect on tourism revenues.

Beaches are often dumping grounds for waste and litter, necessitating the use of beach cleaners and other cleanup projects. More significantly, many beaches are a discharge zone for untreated sewage in most underdeveloped countries; even in developed countries beach closure is an occasional circumstance due to sanitary sewer overflow. In these cases of marine discharge, waterborne disease from fecal pathogens and contamination of certain marine species are a frequent outcome.

=== Artificial beaches ===
Some beaches are artificial; they are either permanent or temporary (For examples, see Copenhagen, Hong Kong, Manila, Monaco, Nottingham, Paris, Rotterdam, Singapore, Tianjin, and Toronto).

The soothing qualities of a beach and the pleasant environment offered to the beachgoer are replicated in artificial beaches, such as "beach style" pools with zero-depth entry and wave pools that recreate the natural waves pounding upon a beach. In a zero-depth entry pool, the bottom surface slopes gradually from above water down to depth. Another approach involves so-called urban beaches, a form of public park becoming common in large cities. Urban beaches attempt to mimic natural beaches with fountains that imitate surf and mask city noises, and in some cases can be used as a play park.

Beach nourishment involves pumping sand onto beaches to improve their health. Beach nourishment is common for major beach cities around the world; however the beaches that have been nourished can still appear quite natural and often many visitors are unaware of the works undertaken to support the health of the beach. Such beaches are often not recognized by consumers as artificial. A famous example of beach nourishment came with the replenishment of Waikīkī Beach in Honolulu, Hawaii, where sand from Manhattan Beach, California was transported via ship and barge throughout most of the 20th century in order to combat Waikiki's erosion problems. The Surfrider Foundation has debated the merits of artificial reefs with members torn between their desire to support natural coastal environments and opportunities to enhance the quality of surfing waves. Similar debates surround beach nourishment and snow cannon in sensitive environments.

=== Restrictions on access ===
Public access to beaches is restricted in some parts of the world. For example, most beaches on the Jersey Shore are restricted to people who can purchase beach tags. Many beaches in Indonesia, both private and public, require admission fees. Some beaches also restrict dogs for some periods of the year.

==== Private beaches ====
Some jurisdictions make all beaches public by law. Some allow private ownership (for example by owners of abutting land or neighborhood associations) to the mean high tide line or mean low tide line. In some jurisdictions, the public has a general easement to use privately owned beach land for certain purposes. Signs are sometimes posted where public access ends.

In some places, such as Florida, it is not always clear which parts of a beach are public or private.

==== Public beaches ====
The first public beach in the United States opened on 12 July 1896, in the town of Revere, Massachusetts, with over 45,000 people attending on the opening day. The beach was run bay the Metropolitan Parks Commission and the new beach had a bandstand, public bathhouses, shade pavilions, and lined by a broad boulevard that ran along the beach.

Public access to beaches is protected by law in the U.S. state of Oregon, thanks to a 1967 state law, the Oregon Beach Bill, which guaranteed public access from the Columbia River to the California state line, "so that the public may have the free and uninterrupted use". Public access to beaches in Hawaii (other than those owned by the U.S. federal government) is also protected by state law.

== Access design ==
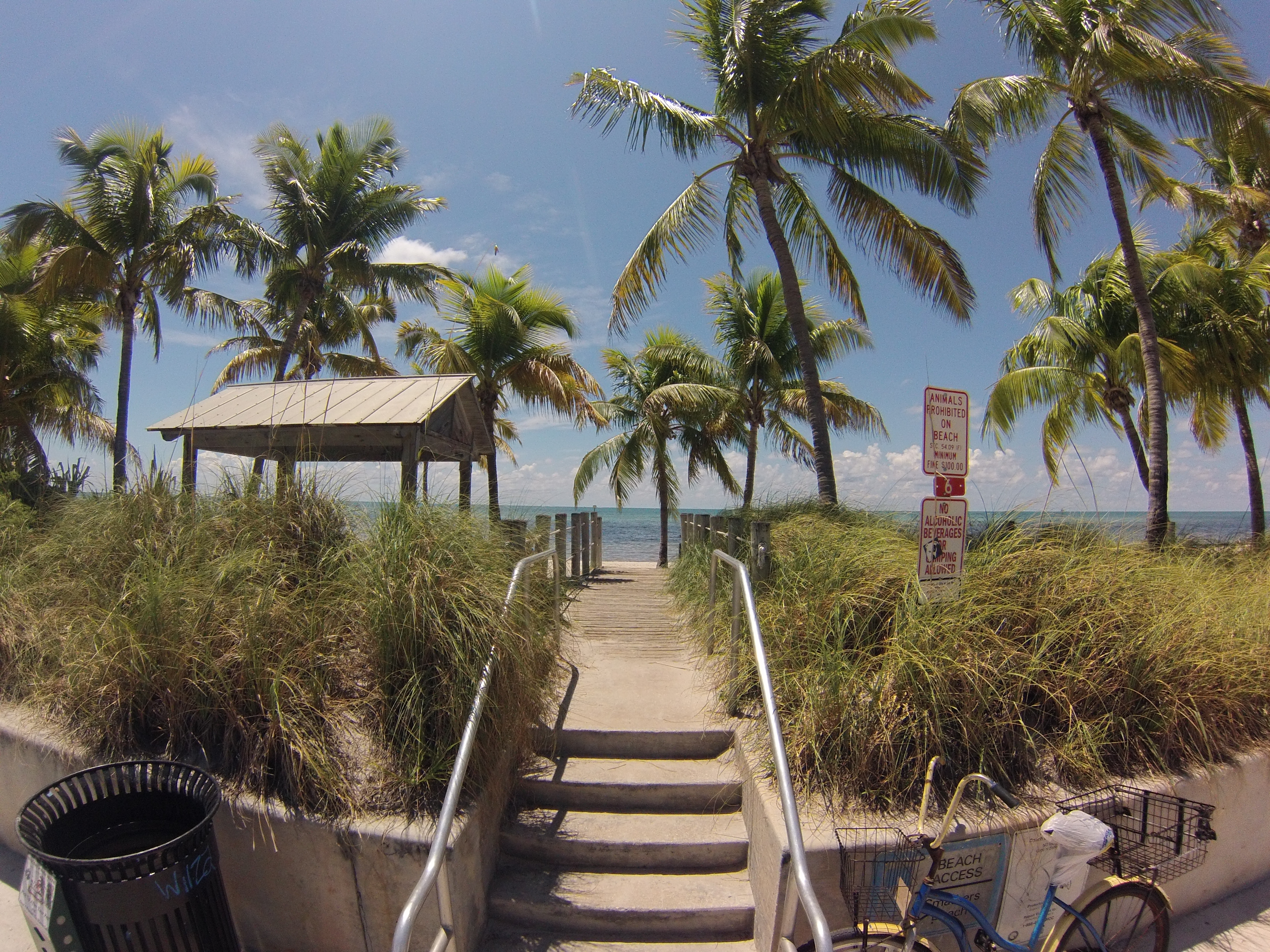
A beach access path in Key West, Florida

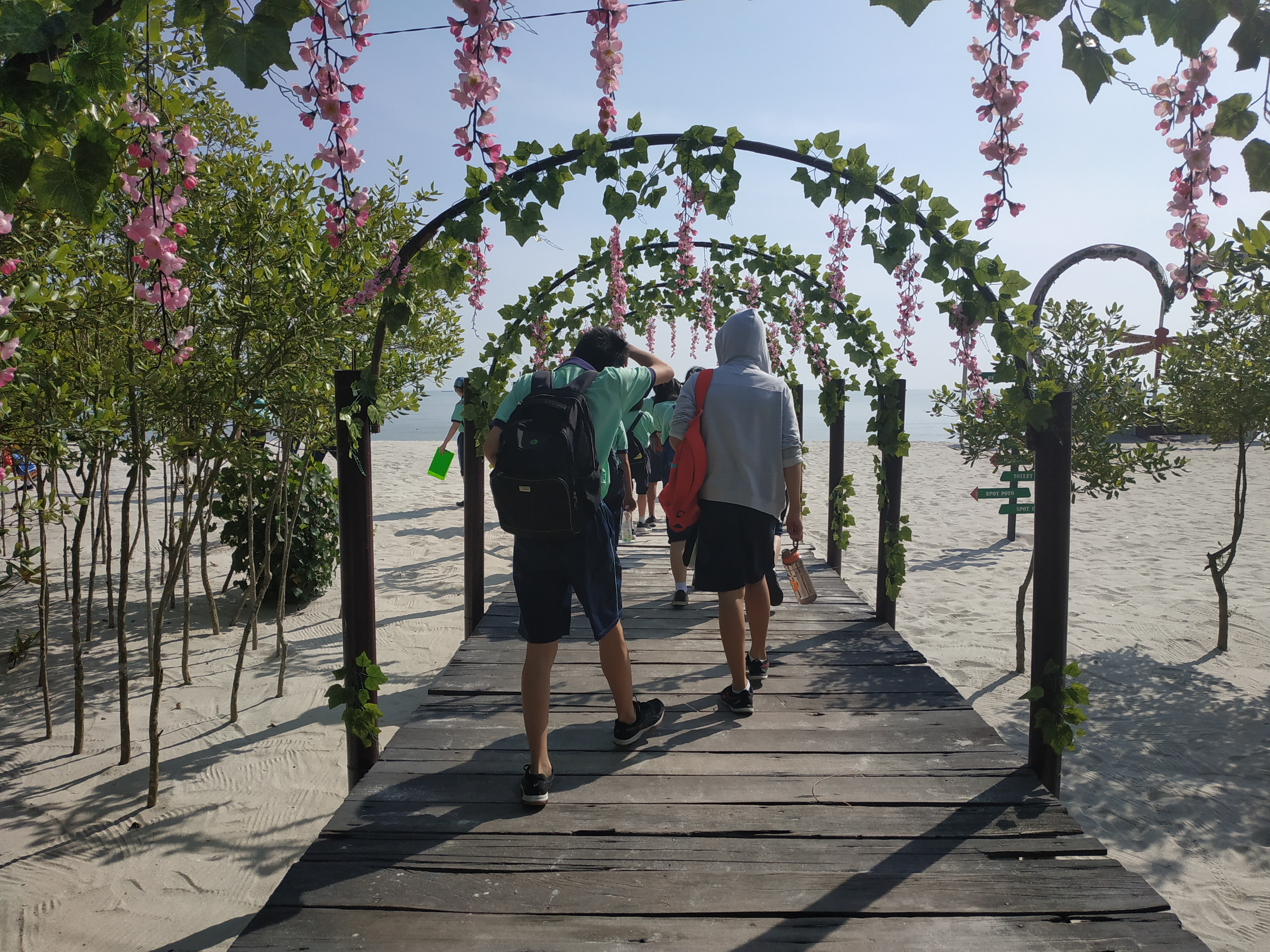
The entrance of the Romance Beach in Medan, using Sakura and spring-like decor, evoking a romantic sense as its name suggests.

Beach access is an important consideration where substantial numbers of pedestrians or vehicles require access to the beach. Allowing random access across delicate foredunes is seldom considered good practice as it is likely to lead to destruction of flora and consequent erosion of the fore dunes.

A well-designed beach access should:

- provide a durable surface able to withstand the traffic flow;
- aesthetically complement the surrounding structures and natural landforms;
- be located in an area that is convenient for users and consistent with safe traffic flows;
- be scaled to match the traffic flow (i.e. wide and strong enough to safely carry the size and quantity of pedestrians and vehicles intended to use it);
- be maintained appropriately; and
- be signed and lit to discourage beach users from creating their own alternative crossings that may be more destructive to the beachhead.

=== Concrete ramp or steps ===
A concrete ramp should follow the natural profile of the beach to prevent it from changing the normal flow of waves, longshore currents, water and wind. A ramp that is below the beach profile will tend to become buried and cease to provide a good surface for vehicular traffic. A ramp or stair that protrudes above the beach profile will tend to disrupt longshore currents creating deposits in front of the ramp, and scouring behind. Concrete ramps are the most expensive vehicular beach accesses to construct requiring use of a quick-drying concrete or a cofferdam to protect them from tidal water during the concrete curing process. Concrete is favored where traffic flows are heavy and access is required by vehicles that are not adapted to soft sand (e.g. road registered passenger vehicles and boat trailers). Concrete stairs are commonly favored on beaches adjacent to population centers where beach users may arrive on the beach in street shoes, or where the foreshore roadway is substantially higher than the beach head and a ramp would be too steep for safe use by pedestrians. A composite stair ramp may incorporate a central or side stair with one or more ramps allowing pedestrians to lead buggies or small boat dollies onto the beach without the aid of a powered vehicle or winch. Concrete ramps and steps should be maintained to prevent a buildup of moss or algae that may make their wet surfaces slippery and dangerous to pedestrians and vehicles.

=== Corduroy (beach ladder) ===
A corduroy road or beach ladder (or board and chain) is an array of planks (usually hardwood or treated timber) laid close together and perpendicular to the direction of traffic flow, and secured at each end by a chain or cable to form a pathway or ramp over the sand dune. Corduroys are cheap and easy to construct and quick to deploy or relocate. They are commonly used for pedestrian access paths and light duty vehicular access ways. They naturally conform to the shape of the underlying beach or dune profile, and adjust well to moderate erosion, especially longshore drift. However, they can cease to be an effective access surface if they become buried or undermined by erosion by surface runoff coming from the beach head. If the corduroy is not wide enough for vehicles using it, the sediment on either side may be displaced creating a spoon drain that accelerates surface runoff and can quickly lead to serious erosion. Significant erosion of the sediment beside and under the corduroy can render it completely ineffective and make it dangerous to pedestrian users who may fall between the planks.

=== Fabric ramp ===
Fabric ramps are commonly employed by the military for temporary purposes where the underlying sediment is stable and hard enough to support the weight of the traffic. A sheet of porous fabric is laid over the sand to stabilize the surface and prevent vehicles from bogging. Fabric Ramps usually cease to be useful after one tidal cycle as they are easily washed away, or buried in sediment.

=== Foliage ramp ===
A foliage ramp is formed by planting resilient species of hardy plants such as grasses over a well-formed sediment ramp. The plants may be supported while they become established by placement of layers of mesh, netting, or coarse organic material such as vines or branches. This type of ramp is ideally suited for intermittent use by vehicles with a low wheel loading such as dune buggies or agricultural vehicles with large tyres. A foliage ramp should require minimal maintenance if initially formed to follow the beach profile, and not overused.

=== Gravel ramp ===
A gravel ramp is formed by excavating the underlying loose sediment and filling the excavation with layers of gravel of graduated sizes as defined by John Loudon McAdam. The gravel is compacted to form a solid surface according to the needs of the traffic. Gravel ramps are less expensive to construct than concrete ramps and are able to carry heavy road traffic provided the excavation is deep enough to reach solid subsoil. Gravel ramps are subject to erosion by water. If the edges are retained with boards or walls and the profile matches the surrounding beach profile, a gravel ramp may become more stable as finer sediments are deposited by percolating water.

== Longest beaches ==
Amongst the world's longest beaches are:

- Praia do Cassino (240 kilometres [150 mi]) in Brazil;
- Eighty Mile Beach (220 kilometres [140 mi]) in north-west Australia;
- Padre Island beach (217 kilometres [135 mi]) in the Gulf of Mexico, Texas, USA. After adding an artificial inlet, the length of the Padre Island National Seashore is now 105 kilometres [65.5 mi]);
- Ninety Mile Beach, Victoria (151 kilometres [94 mi]) in Victoria, Australia;
- Cox's Bazar, Bangladesh (120 kilometres [75 mi]) in Bangladesh;
- Naikoon Provincial Park (100 kilometres [62 mi]) in the north-east of Haida Gwaii, Canada;
- 90 Mile Beach (88 kilometres [55 mi]) in New Zealand;
- Playa Novillera beach (about 82 kilometres [51 mi]) in Mexico;
- Fraser Island beach (75 kilometres [47 mi]) in Queensland, Australia, located on the world's largest sand island;
- Troia-Sines Beach (65 kilometres [40 mi]) in Portugal;
- Long Beach Peninsula (45 kilometres [28 mi]), the world's longest peninsula beach, in Washington, USA.

== Wildlife ==
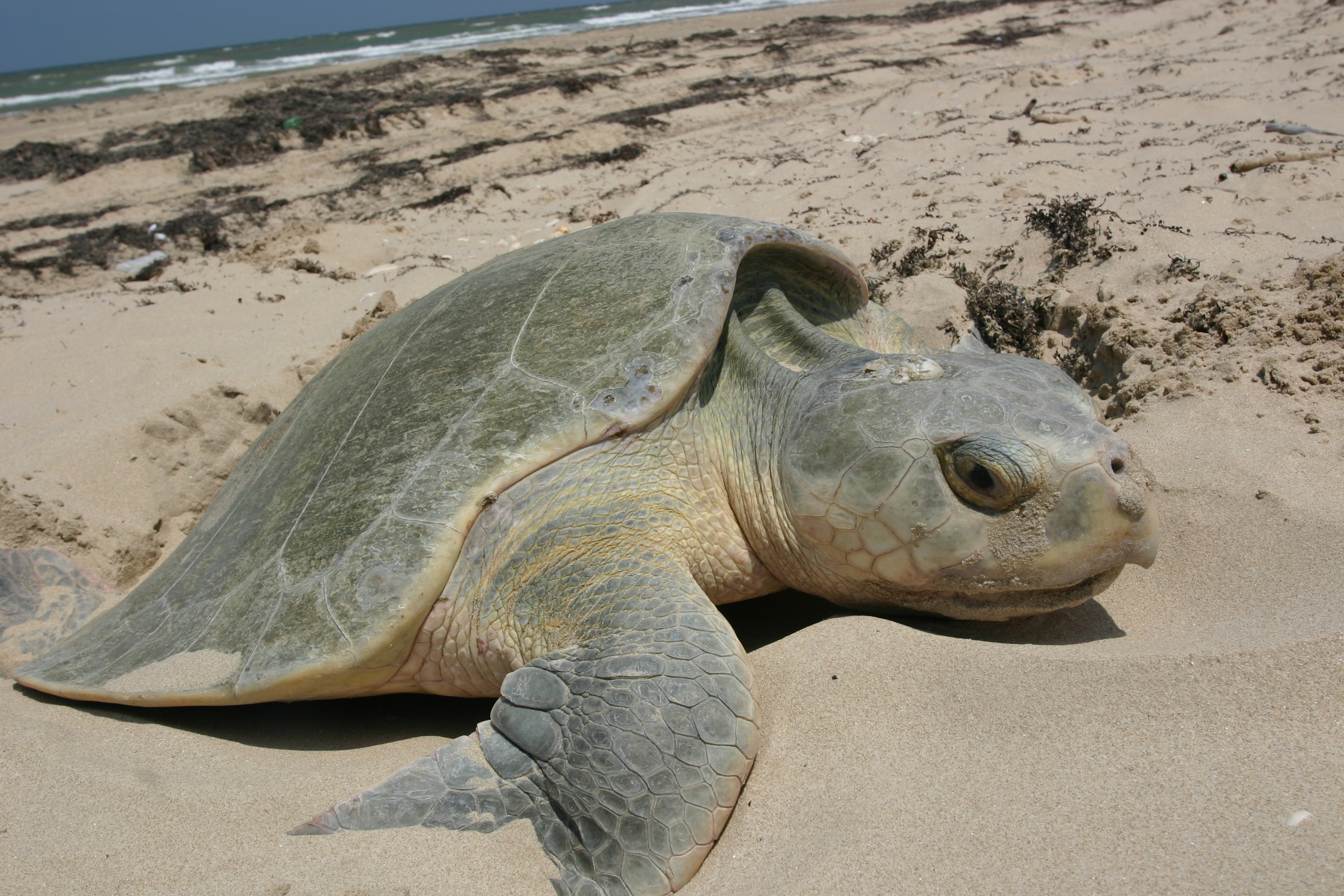
A Kemp's ridley sea turtle nesting on the berm section of the beach; beyond can be seen plant debris in the wrack line.

The intertidal beach is an unstable environment that exposes plants and animals to changeable and potentially harsh conditions. The number of organisms living on these beaches is a function of sand size and wave action. Beaches with smaller waves and weak baskwash tend to have finer sand, which retains more water for use by intertidal animals. Some animals burrow into the sand and feed on material deposited by the waves. Crabs, insects and shorebirds feed on these beach dwellers. The endangered piping plover and some tern species rely on beaches for nesting. Sea turtles also bury their eggs in ocean beaches. Seagrasses and other beach plants grow on undisturbed areas of the beach and dunes.

Ocean beaches are habitats with organisms adapted to salt spray, tidal overwash, and shifting sands. Some of these organisms are found only on beaches. Examples of these beach organisms in the southeast US include plants like sea oats, sea rocket, beach elder, beach morning glory (Ipomoea pes-caprae), and beach peanut (Okenia hypogaea), and animals such as mole crabs (Hippoidea), coquina clams (Donax), ghost crabs, and white beach tiger beetles.

== See also ==
- Beach advisory
- Beach ball
- Beach cleaner
- Beach evolution
- Beach polo
- Coast
- List of beaches
- Sand art and play
- Shore
- Smart beach
- Strand plain
- Urban beach
- Nude beach

== Gallery ==
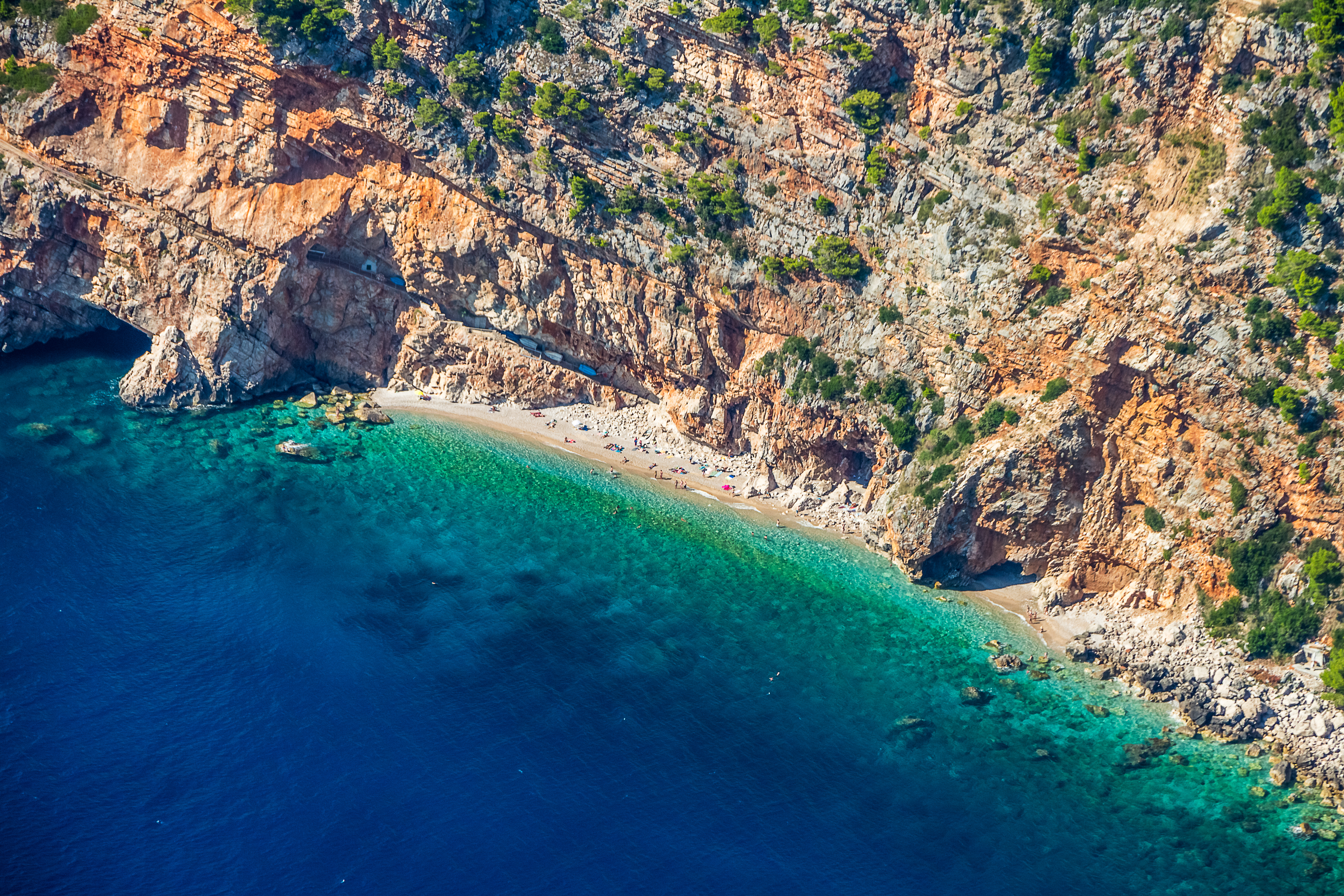
Hidden beach in southern Croatia

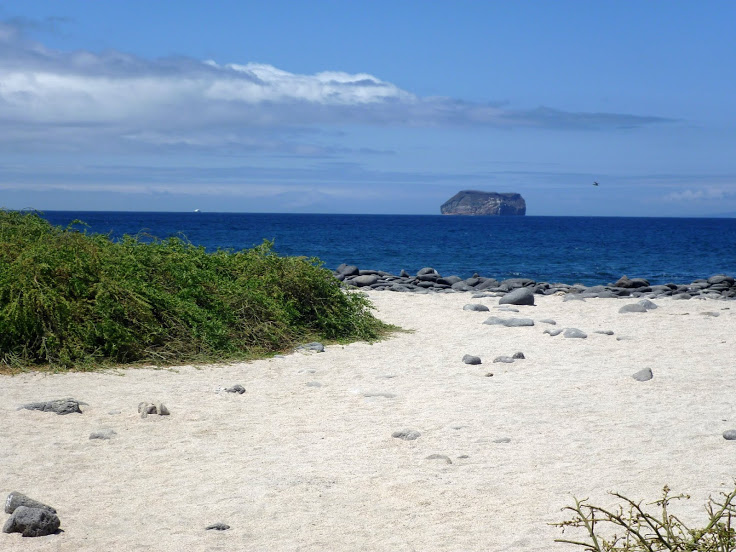
Beach in the Galápagos Islands reserved for marine animals

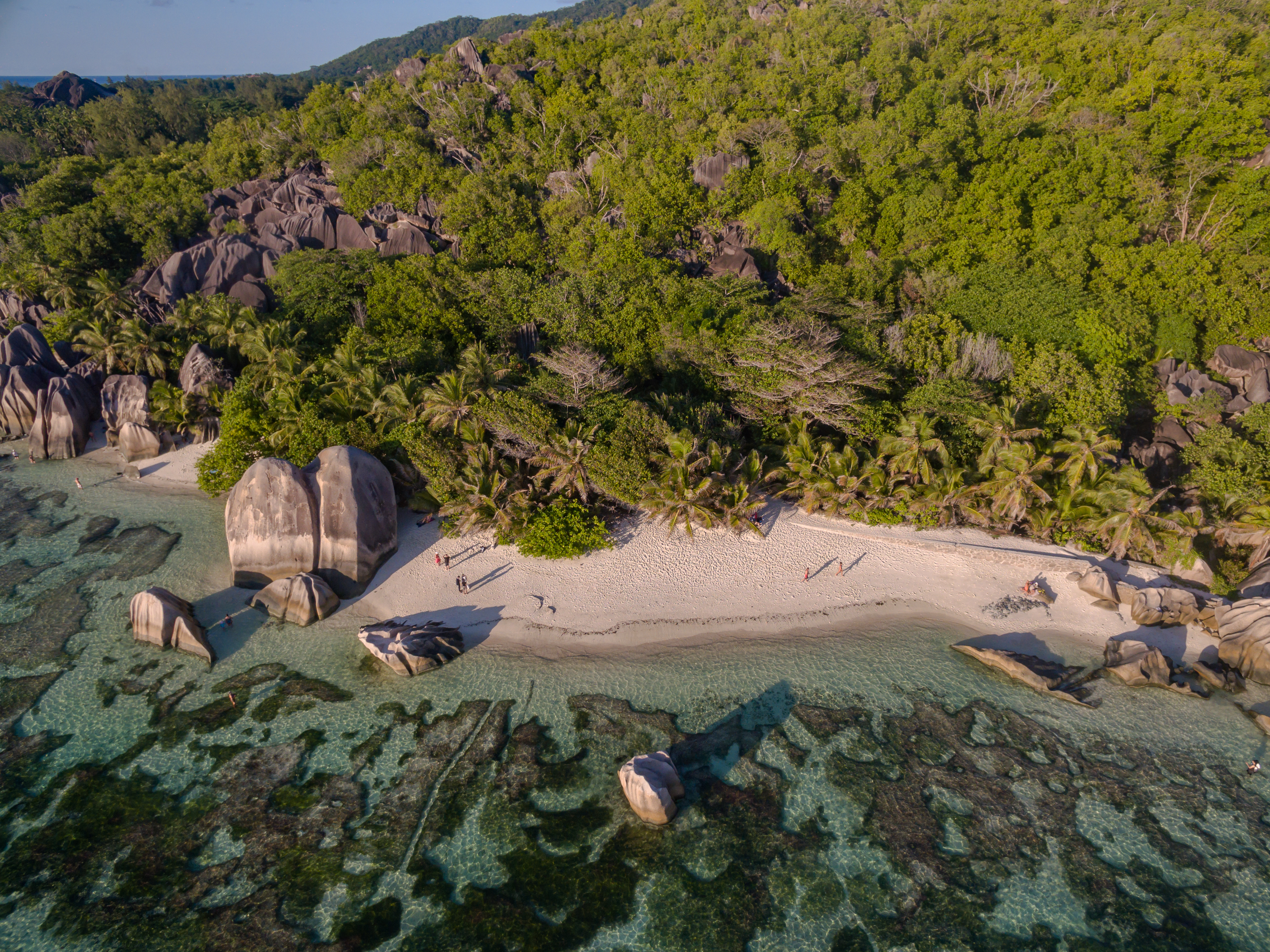
Anse Source d'Argent, La Digue, Seychelles

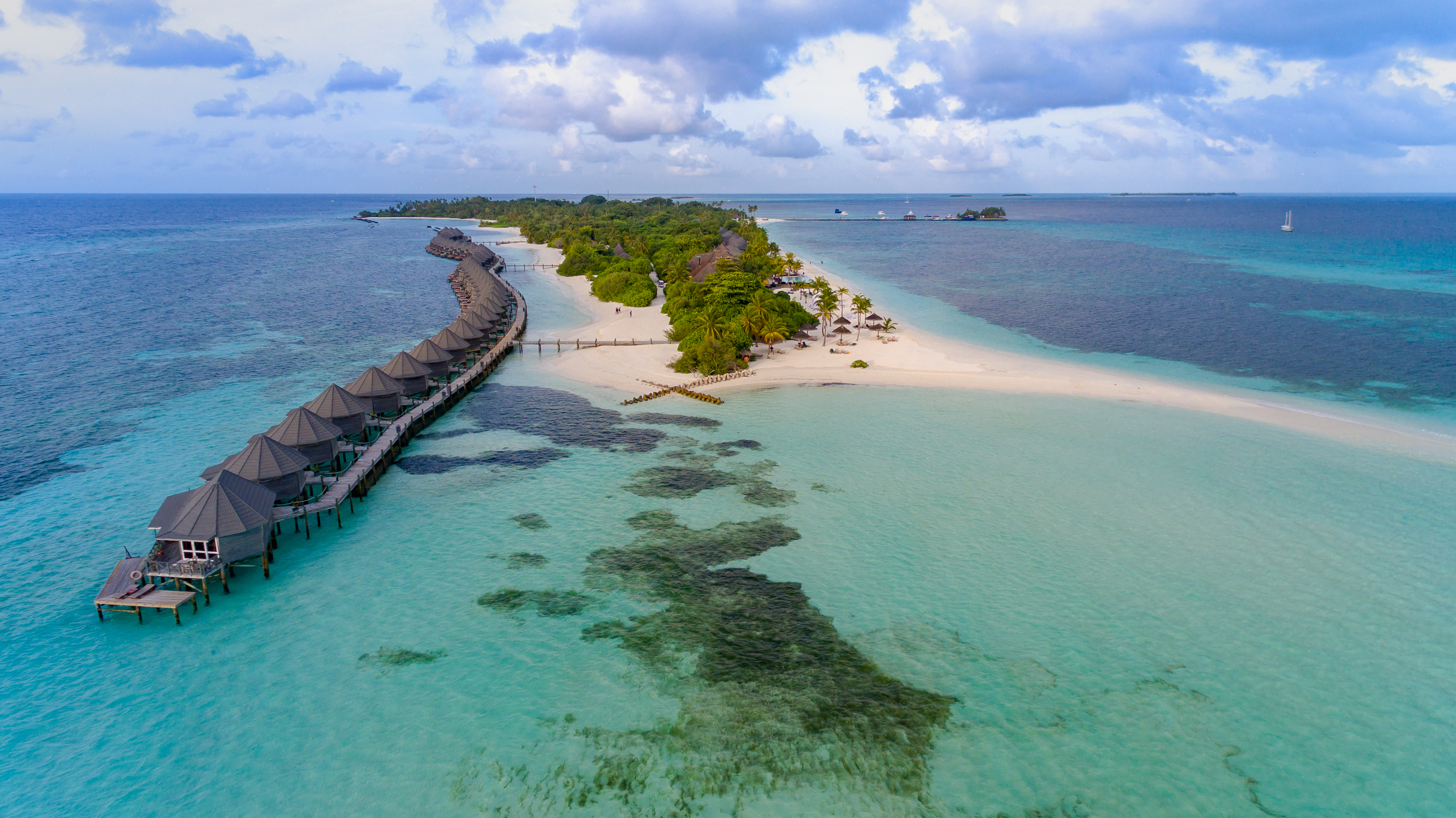
Maldives dream beaches

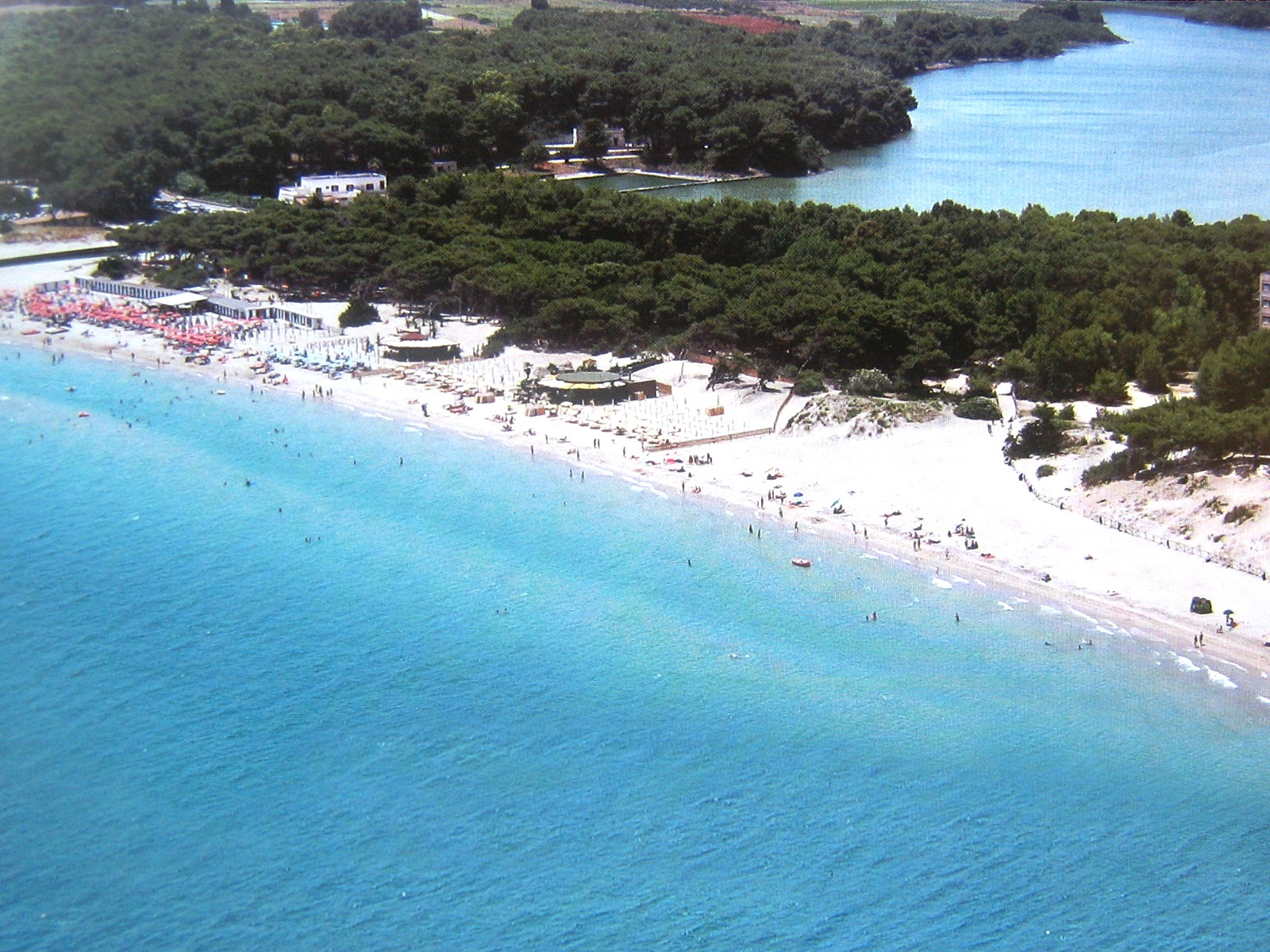
Beach in Otranto, Salento, Apulia, Italy

== Works cited ==
- Andrews, Robert (2002). The Rough Guide to Britain. Rough Guides. ISBN 978-1-85828-881-9.
