= Fuerteventura =

Canary Island

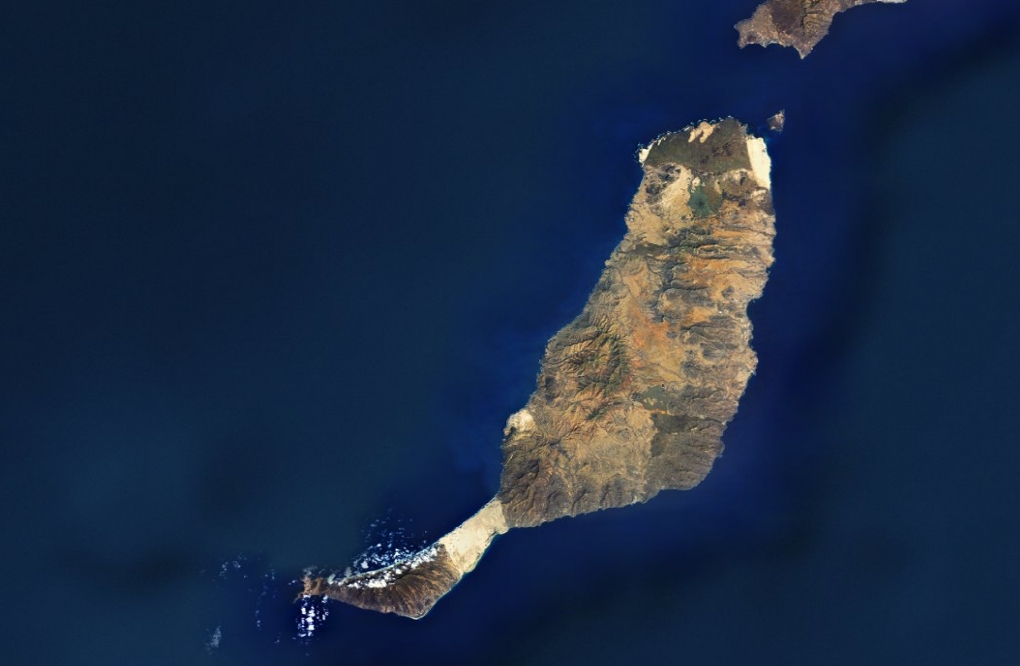
- Satellite view (2011)

Geography
- Location: Atlantic Ocean
- Coordinates: 28°24′N 14°00′W
- Archipelago: Canary Islands
- Area: 1,659.74 km^{2} (640.83 sq mi)
- Coastline: 304 km (188.9 mi)
- Highest elevation: 807 m (2648 ft)

Administration
- Spain
- Autonomous Community: Canary Islands
- Province: Las Palmas
- Capital and largest city: Puerto del Rosario (pop. 43,493)

Demographics
- Demonym: majorero/-a
- Population: 131,502 (April 2026)
- Pop. density: 77.8/km^{2} (201.5/sq mi)
- Languages: Spanish, specifically Canarian Spanish
- Ethnic groups: Spanish, Canary Islanders, other minority groups

Additional information
- Time zone: WET (UTC±00:00)
  - Summer (DST): WEST (UTC+01:00)

Fuerteventura (Spanish: [ˌfweɾteβenˈtuɾa]) is one of the Canary Islands, in the Atlantic Ocean, geographically part of Macaronesia, and politically part of Spain. It is located 97 km (60 mi) away from the coast of North Africa. The island was declared a biosphere reserve by UNESCO in 2009.

Fuerteventura belongs to the Province of Las Palmas, one of the two provinces that form the autonomous community of the Canary Islands. The island's capital is Puerto del Rosario, where the Insule Council (the government of the island) is found. Fuerteventura had 131,502 inhabitants (as of April 2026), the fourth largest population of the Canary Islands and the third of the province. At 1,659.74 km^{2} (640.83 sq mi), it is the second largest of the Canary Islands, after Tenerife. From a geological point of view, Fuerteventura is the oldest island in the archipelago.

== Toponymy ==
The island's current name is a compound formed by the Spanish words fuerte ("strong" or "fort") and ventura ("fortune"). Traditionally, Fuerteventura's name has incorrectly thought to have been a reference to the strong winds (Spanish: fuertes vientos) around the island coastline, and the resulting danger to nautical adventurers. However, it might have referred instead, or also, to wealth, luck or destiny.

In 1339 the Mallorcan navigator Angelino Dulcert, in the Planisferio de Angelino Dulcert, referred to the island as "Forte Ventura".

Another theory is that the island's name derives from "Fortunatae Insulae" (Fortunate Islands), the name by which the Romans knew the Canary Islands. According to Pliny, the island was originally known as Planaria, in reference to the flatness of most of its terrain.

The indigenous Guanche name of the island, before its conquest in the 15th century, was Erbania. It was divided into two regions (Jandía and Maxorata), from which the Canarian Spanish name majorero (originally majo or maxo) derives. However, it has been suggested that, at some point, Maxorata (which meant "the children of the country") was the aboriginal toponym of the entire island.

== History ==
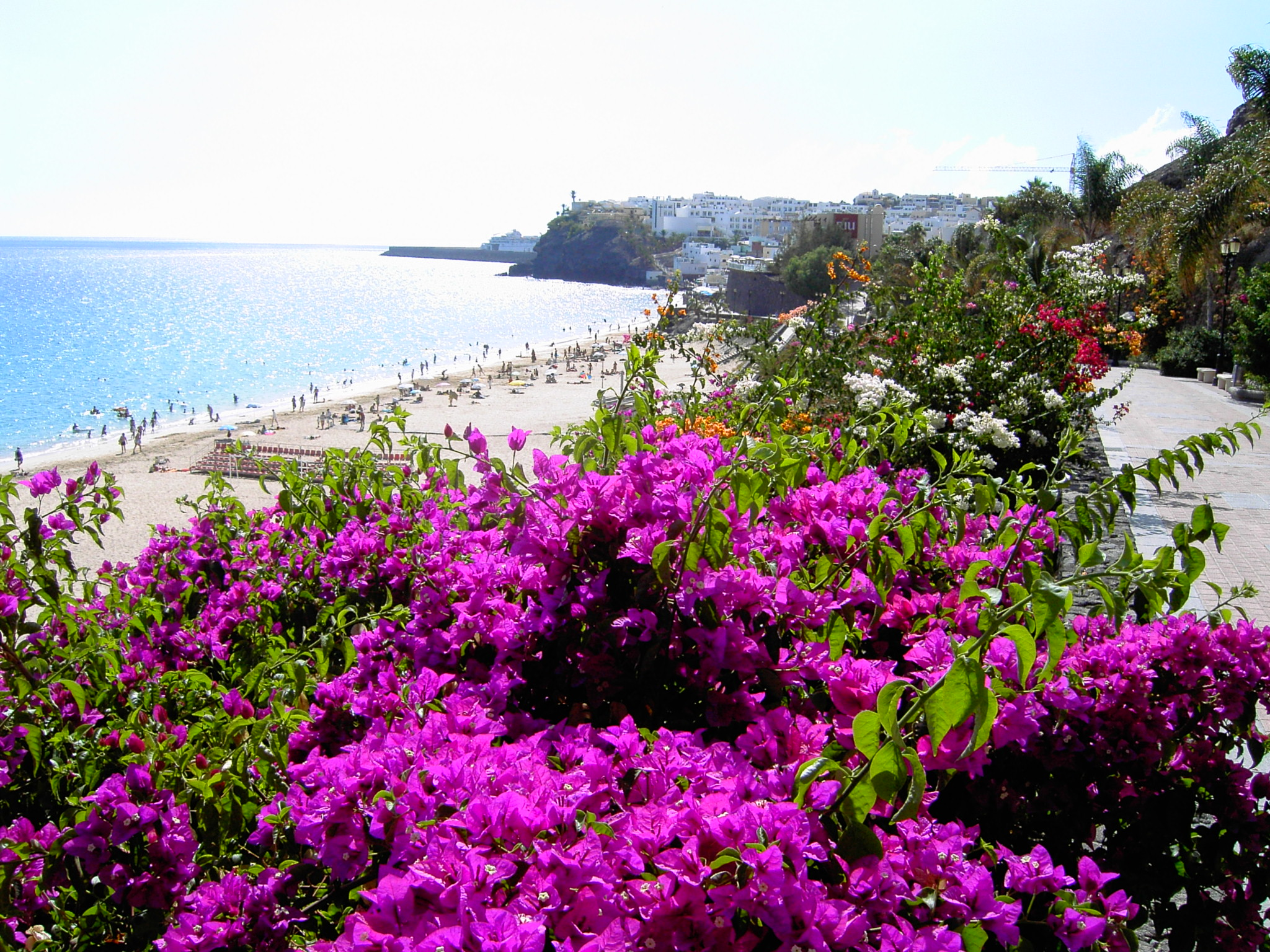
Morro Jable

=== Precolonial history ===
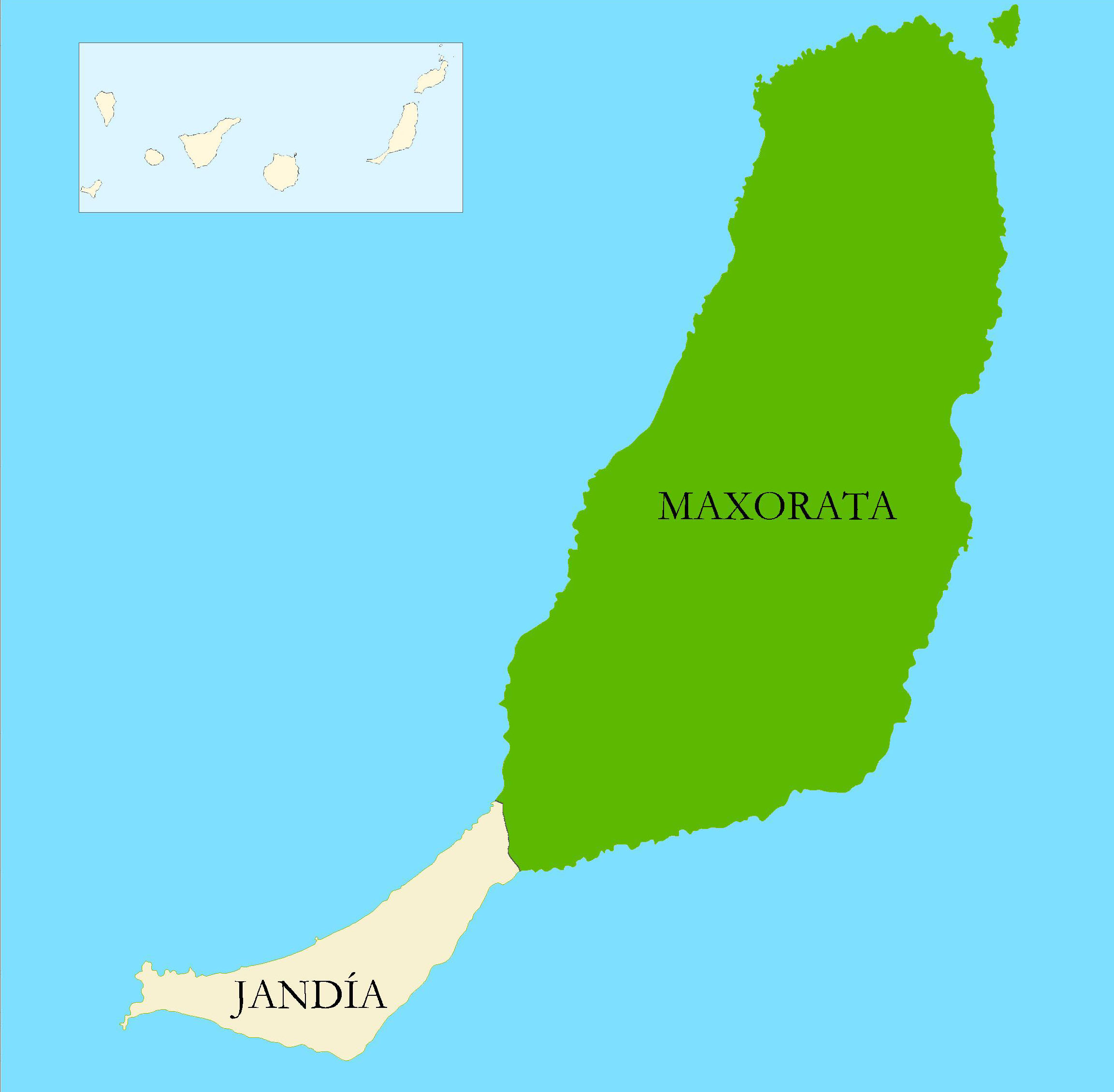
The two kingdoms of precolonial Fuerteventura: Jandía and Maxorata

The first settlers of Fuerteventura are believed to have come from North Africa. The word Mahorero (Majorero) or Maho is still used today to describe the people of Fuerteventura and is derived from the Guanche word maho, a type of goatskin shoe worn by these original inhabitants. They lived in caves and semi-subterranean dwellings, some of which have been excavated, revealing remnants of early tools and pottery.

Phoenician settlers may have landed in Fuerteventura and Lanzarote; however, there is no unambiguous evidence for this.

At the time of the Iberian conquest, the island was divided into two Guanche kingdoms, one ruled by King Guize and the other by King Ayoze. The territories of these kingdoms were called Maxorata (in the north) and Jandía (in the south) respectively. They were separated by a wall, which traversed the La Pared isthmus. Some remains have been preserved. The ancient name for the island, Erbania, is derived from this wall's name.

=== Conquest ===
Several Spanish and Portuguese expeditions to the islands were organized around 1340, followed by Moors and European slave traders.

The island's official conquest began in earnest in 1402, commanded by French knights and crusaders Jean de Béthencourt and Gadifer de la Salle. As told by La Canarien, a chronicle of the conquest of the islands, they arrived with only 63 sailors out of the original 283, as many had deserted along the way. After arriving and settling in Lanzarote, the invaders made some first excursions to the neighboring islands. In 1404, de Bethencourt and de Gadifer founded Betancuria, on the west coast, the first settlement on the island. After numerous difficulties, de Gadifer took charge of the invasion, while de Bethencourt returned to Spain to seek the recognition and support of the Castilian king.

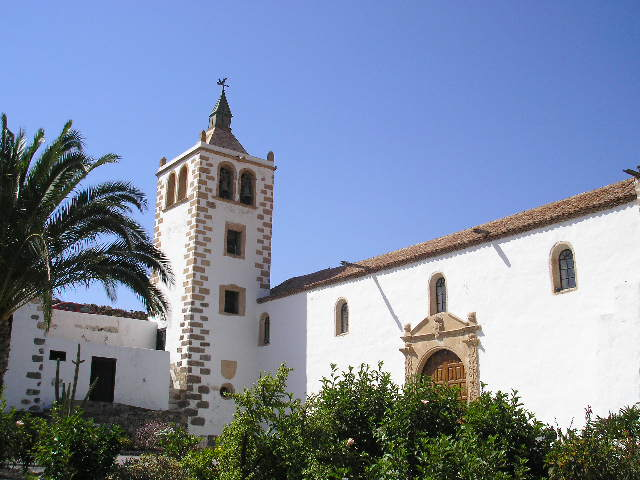
Parish of Santa María de Betancuria, Betancuria

In 1405, de Béthencourt completed his conquest of the island, establishing its capital in Betancuria. At this point, it had about 1,200 inhabitants. The population increased gradually thereafter.

In 1424, Pope Martin V, through the Betancuria Brief, issued an edict establishing the Bishopric of Fuerteventura, which encompassed all the Canary Islands, save for the island of Lanzarote. The origin of this bishopric is directly related to the events that occurred after the Great Schism (1378–1417): the bishop of San Marcial del Rubicón of Lanzarote (at the time, the only diocese in the Canary Islands) did not recognize the papacy of Martin V, and instead adhered to the anti-Pope Benedict XIII. The Bishopric of Fuerteventura was, thus, based in the Parish of Santa María de Betancuria, bestowing upon the latter the status of Cathedral. After the reabsorption of the Diocese of San Marcial del Rubicón by the papacy of Pope Martin V, the Bishopric of Fuerteventura was abolished in 1431, only seven years after it was created.

In 1476, the territory became the Señorío Territorial de Fuerteventura, subjected to the Catholic Monarchs. In later years, the island was invaded by the Spanish, French and the English.

=== Second conquest of Fuerteventura ===
Over time, the island endured numerous raids. A Berber-led expedition invaded in 1593, sweeping as far inland as the capital. Various castles were built along the coastline, to protect against these types of attacks. The population was moved inland as a second protective measure. Because of the raids, a first Captain General was dispatched to Fuerteventura, accompanied by a number of Sergeants Major, in order to defend the island in the name of the Crown. At that time, Betancuria became the religious capital of the island.

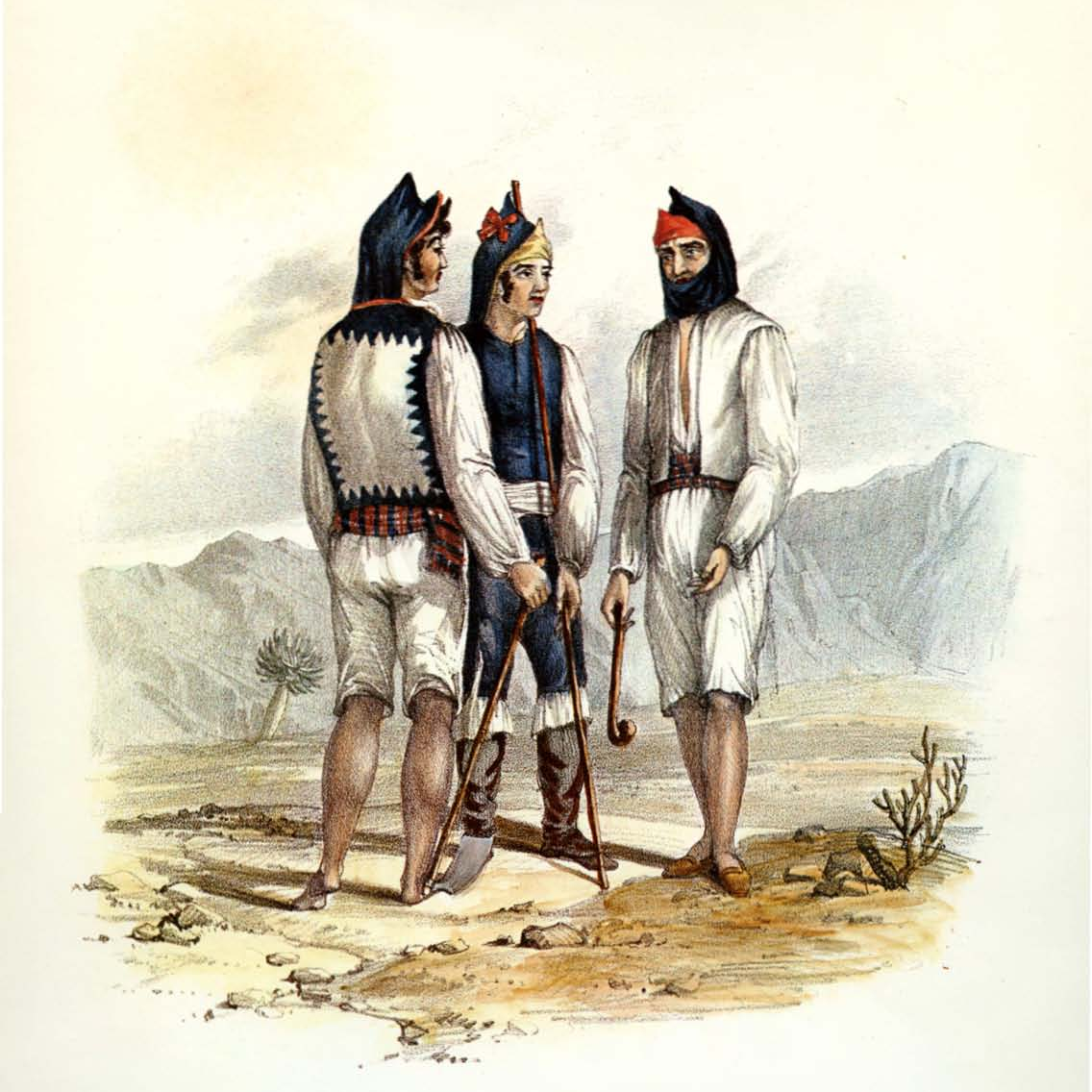
Natives of Fuerteventura, by Alfred Diston, 1829

The island's garrison was officially instated in 1708. Its colonel assumed the title of Governor at Arms, a hereditary, lifelong appointment which has remained in the Sánchez-Dumpiérrez family. In time, this family increasingly garnered power over the other islands through alliances with the Arias de Saavedra family and the Lady of Fuerteventura. During the same year, the Auxiliary Parish of La Oliva and Pájara was created, which became operational in 1711.

After war broke out between Spain and the United Kingdom, two major attacks took place in 1740, within two months of each other. Two separate bands of English privateers attempted to loot the town of Tuineje, on 13 October and 24 November. These attacks were, however, successfully averted by the local population and the island's militia. This successful repelling of the invaders is celebrated at a re-enactment that takes place in Gran Tarajal every year in October.

1780 saw the start of the barrilla plantation industry.

On 17 December 1790, the Auxiliary Parish of Tuineje was created, which became a new parish division on 23 June 1792, under Bishop Tavira. This included part of the Jandía peninsula, and had a population of 1,670 inhabitants.

=== To the present ===
In 1852, a free trade status was granted by Isabella II to the Canary Islands. This allowed the islands to become a major international trade hub, exempt from customs duties on imported and exported goods. Military island rule, which began in 1708, was finally dissolved in 1859, and Puerto de Cabras (now Puerto del Rosario) - the only municipal seat on the coast - became the new capital.

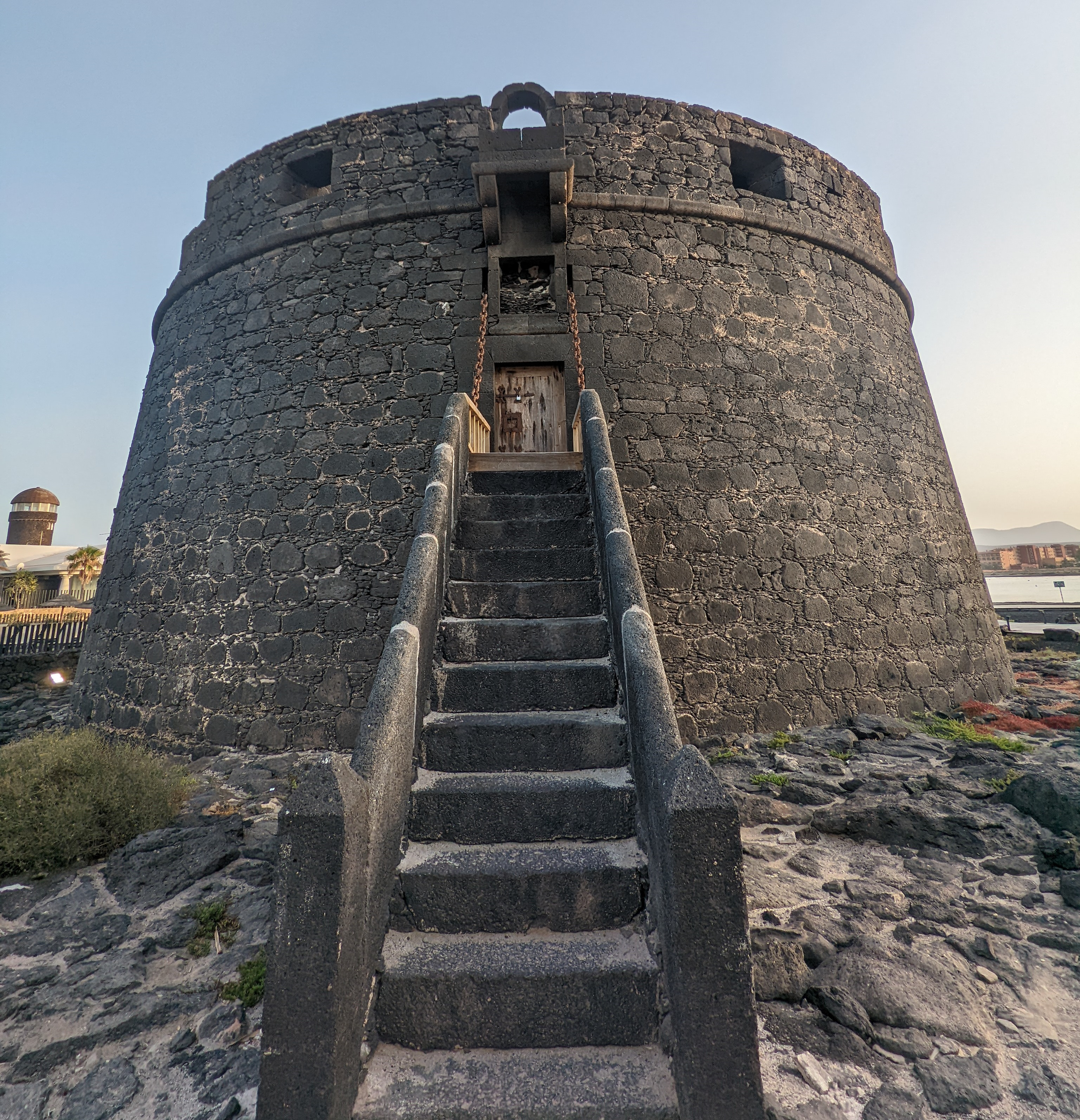
Castillo de San Buenaventura

In 1912, the cabildo insular system was established, which allowed each island to establish its own government. Fuerteventura's cabildo was based in Puerto del Rosario. In 1927, Fuerteventura and Lanzarote became part of the province of Gran Canaria.

In 1941, work began on a military airfield, just west of Puerto del Rosario on the road to Tindaya, which opened to commercial use in 1950. The remains are still visible today. In 1956, the capital was renamed to Puerto del Rosario. Mass tourism started in the mid-1960s, facilitated by the construction of Fuerteventura Airport at El Matorral, inaugurated in 1969, and the first tourist hotels.

The island's proximity (a mere 100 km) to the West African coast and, the fact that it is part of the Schengen territory, make it a prime target destination for undocumented immigrants. However, many have perished while attempting the crossing.

== Flag ==
Flag of Fuerteventura

The flag of Fuerteventura is in proportions 1:2, divided vertically, green to the hoist and white to the fly end, with the coat of arms of the island in the centre.

=== Coat of arms ===
The coat of arms of Fuerteventura was prescribed by a decree adopted on 15 October 1998 by the Government of the Canary Islands, and published on 11 November 1998 in the official gazette of the Canary Islands. It was adopted on 24 April 1998 by the Island Council and validated on 18 September 1998 by the Heraldry Commission of the Canary Islands.

The heraldic description is "per pale and per fess. First, gules, a castle or, masoned sable, its gate and windows azure. Second, argent, lion gules, crowned, armed and langued or. Third, silver, three fesses chequy gules and or, in four rows, each one charged with a fess or. Bordure gules, with eight saltires or. Ensigned with a royal crown, open."

According to José Manuel Erbez, the coat of arms is based on the arms of the island's provincial militia. The upper quarters represent Castile (symbolized by a castle) and León (symbolized by a lion). The lower quarter alludes to the Saavedra family; various members of this family were lords of Fuerteventura.

== Geography ==
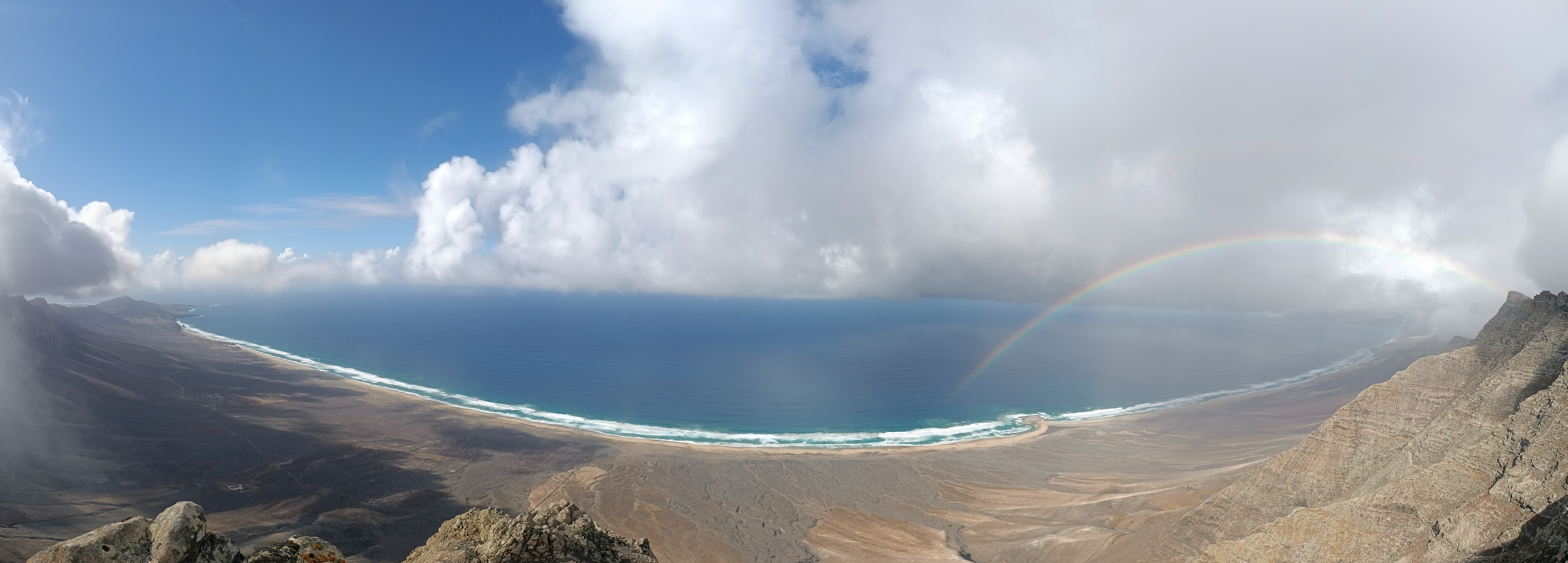
View from Pico de la Palma, Fuerteventura

=== Environment ===
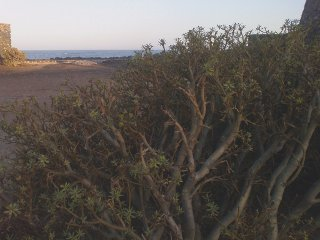
Euphorbia regis-jubae, food plant of Hyles tithymali

The elongated island is 100 km (62 mi) long and 31 km (19 mi) wide. It has an area of 1,660 km^{2} (641 sq mi).

Located just 100 km (62 mi) off the coast of North Africa, it is the second biggest of the islands, after Tenerife, and has the longest white sand beaches in the archipelago. The island is a destination for sun, beach and watersports enthusiasts. It lies at the same latitude as Florida and Mexico and temperatures rarely fall below 18 °C (64 °F) or rise above 32 °C (90 °F). It counts 152 separate beaches along its seaboard, approximately 77 km (48 mi)— 50 km (31 mi) of which are white sand and 25 km (16 mi) of which are black volcanic shingle.

The highest point in Fuerteventura is Pico de la Zarza, standing at 2,648 feet (807 m) in the southwestern part of the island. Geographical features include Istmo de la Pared which is 5 km (3 mi) wide and is the narrowest part of Fuerteventura, and the Betancuria massif, in the center of the island, with a maximum elevation of 762 m (2,500 ft). The island is divided into two parts: the northern portion is called Maxorata and the southwestern part is called the Jandía peninsula.

Approximately 477 km^{2} (184 sq mi) of the island is covered by 13 protected natural spaces, established by the Canarian Network of Protected Natural Spaces. This includes the lava-covered areas of Malpaís Grande and Chico, the place of scientific interest located on Jandía salt flat and Tindaya Mountain.

=== Climate ===
Fuerteventura has a hot desert climate (Köppen: BWh). The climate is mild, but mostly windy, throughout the year. The island is hence referred to as "the island of eternal spring". The sea regulates air temperature, diverting hot Sahara winds away from the island, through the Canary Current. The island's name in English translates as "strong fortune" or "strong wind", the Spanish word for wind being viento. During the winter months, temperatures average a high of 22 °C (72 °F) and a low of around 15 °C (59 °F), whereas during the summer a mean high of 28 °C (82 °F) and a low of 20 °C (68 °F) can be expected. Precipitation is about 147 mm (6 in) per year, most of which falls in autumn and winter. December is the month with highest rainfall.

A sandstorm known as the Calima (similar to the Sirocco wind, which blows to the North of the Sahara, to Europe) may blow from the Sahara Desert to the northwest, and can cause high temperatures, low visibility and drying air. Temperatures during this phenomenon rise temporarily by approximately 10 degrees Celsius. The wind brings in fine red dust. The fine white sand is not blown in from Sahara; it is made up of dead coral reef and local seabed upheaval. Visibility can drop to between 100 and 200 m (328.08 and 656.17 ft) or even lower and can even bring African locusts to the island.

Climate data for Fuerteventura Airport, 25 m (1981–2010)
Month	Jan	Feb	Mar	Apr	May	Jun	Jul	Aug	Sep	Oct	Nov	Dec	Year
Record high °C (°F)	28.5 (83.3)	30.8 (87.4)	34.0 (93.2)	38.0 (100.4)	36.8 (98.2)	41.6 (106.9)	43.0 (109.4)	41.0 (105.8)	37.9 (100.2)	36.5 (97.7)	34.8 (94.6)	29.5 (85.1)	43.0 (109.4)
Mean daily maximum °C (°F)	20.6 (69.1)	21.0 (69.8)	22.2 (72.0)	22.9 (73.2)	24.1 (75.4)	25.8 (78.4)	27.3 (81.1)	27.8 (82.0)	27.5 (81.5)	26.1 (79.0)	24.0 (75.2)	22.0 (71.6)	24.3 (75.7)
Daily mean °C (°F)	17.6 (63.7)	17.9 (64.2)	18.9 (66.0)	19.5 (67.1)	20.6 (69.1)	22.5 (72.5)	24.0 (75.2)	24.6 (76.3)	24.4 (75.9)	22.9 (73.2)	20.9 (69.6)	18.9 (66.0)	21.1 (70.0)
Mean daily minimum °C (°F)	14.7 (58.5)	14.8 (58.6)	15.5 (59.9)	16.0 (60.8)	17.1 (62.8)	19.1 (66.4)	20.8 (69.4)	21.5 (70.7)	21.2 (70.2)	19.8 (67.6)	17.7 (63.9)	15.9 (60.6)	17.8 (64.0)
Record low °C (°F)	8.0 (46.4)	8.0 (46.4)	8.0 (46.4)	9.5 (49.1)	11.6 (52.9)	13.0 (55.4)	14.0 (57.2)	15.0 (59.0)	15.0 (59.0)	12.0 (53.6)	10.5 (50.9)	9.0 (48.2)	8.0 (46.4)
Average rainfall mm (inches)	14 (0.6)	16 (0.6)	12 (0.5)	5 (0.2)	1 (0.0)	0 (0)	0 (0)	0 (0)	2 (0.1)	8 (0.3)	13 (0.5)	26 (1.0)	97 (3.8)
Average rainy days	2.5	2.4	1.9	1.0	0.2	0.0	0.0	0.1	0.5	1.7	2.2	3.2	15.7
Average relative humidity (%)	68	69	68	65	66	67	69	71	72	73	71	71	69
Mean monthly sunshine hours	190	190	233	242	280	285	294	289	246	227	203	186	2,836
Source: Agencia Estatal de Meteorología

=== Hydrology ===
In the winter months, up to 80% of the rainwater flows unused into the ocean, as there is no vegetation to capture the water, due to overgrazing by free-ranging goats near the coast. The mountain forests, which were still present in the 19th century, were all chopped down. Instead, there are many desalination plants (running on electricity) which produce the required amount of freshwater on the island. The tourists on the island use about double the amount of water as the native inhabitants of Fuerteventura, through the need to fill swimming pools, water hotel gardens and wash linens.

=== Geology ===
Fuerteventura is the oldest island in the Canary Islands, dating back 20 million years to a volcanic eruption from the Canary hotspot. The majority of the island was created about 5 million years ago and, since then, has been eroded by wind and precipitation. On the seabed off the west coast of the island rests an enormous slab of bedrock 22 km (14 mi) long and 11 km (7 mi) wide, which appears to have slid off the island largely intact at some point in prehistory, similar to the predicted future collapse of Cumbre Vieja, a geological fault on another Canary Island, La Palma. The last volcanic activity in Fuerteventura occurred between 4,000 and 5,000 years ago.

==== Topography ====
Fuerteventura's highest elevations are concentrated in the Jandía Massif at the southern end of the island, within the Jandía Natural Park. The three tallest peaks all sit along the same ridge of the massif:

- Pico de la Zarza (also known as Pico de Jandía), 807 m, the highest point on the island
- Pico de Mocán, 792 m
- Pico de la Palma, 741 m
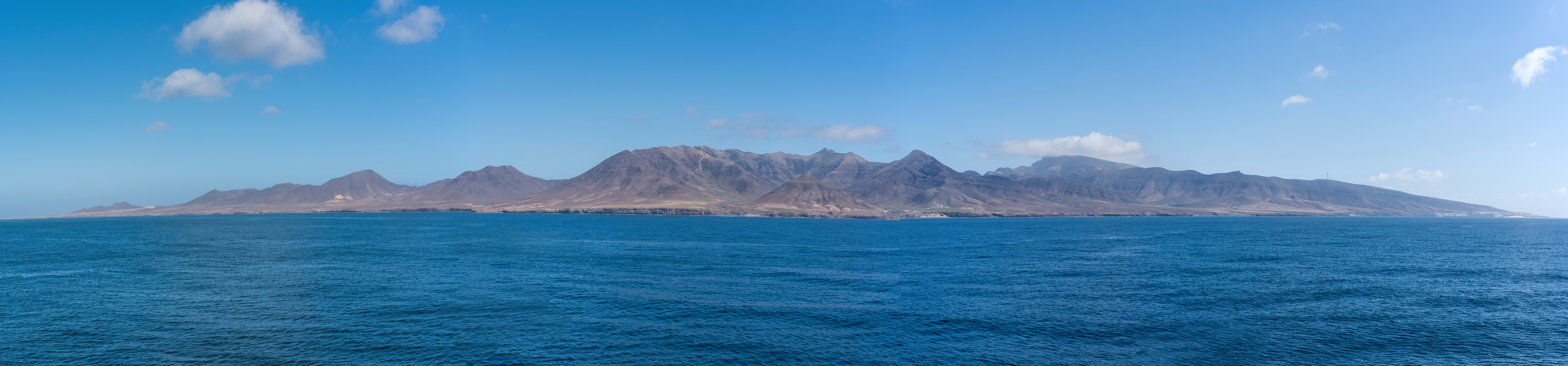
Fuerteventura seen from the south. The port of Morro Jable is seen to the far right.

=== Beaches ===
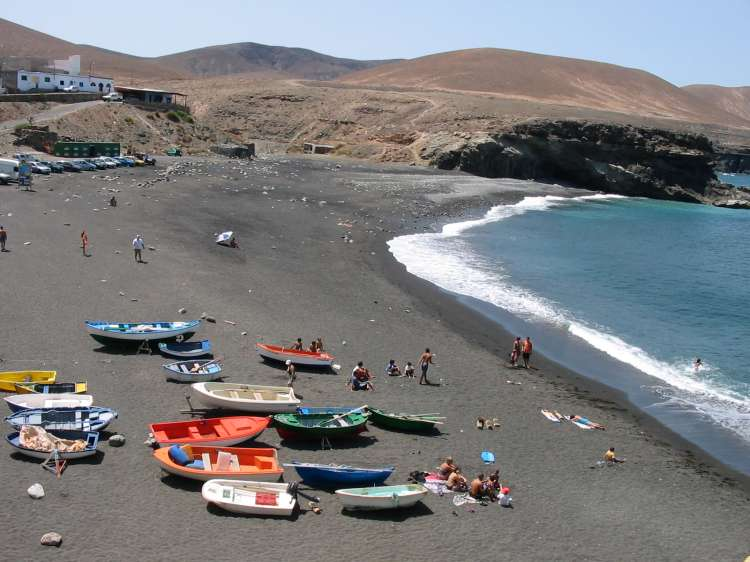
The black-sand beach at Ajuy

Fuerteventura was chosen by the Quality Coast International Certification Program of the European Coastal and Marine Union, among 500 European destinations, as one of the most attractive tourist destinations for visitors interested in cultural heritage, environment and sustainability. The best beaches to visit are Playa de Cofete, Playas de Jandia, Playas de Corralejo, Playa de Ajuy, and Playas de El Cotillo.

=== Wildlife ===
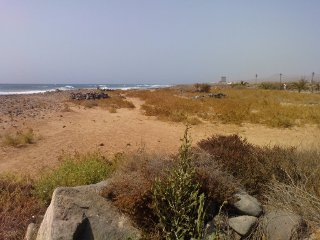
Typical xerophytic vegetation in Fuerteventura, contrasting with the laurisilva forests on the islands of El Hierro, La Gomera and La Palma which are exposed to the Gulf Stream

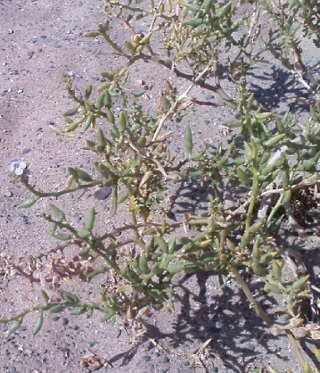
Food plant of Pontia daplidice on Fuerteventura. It is pollinated by Amegilla cavifrons.

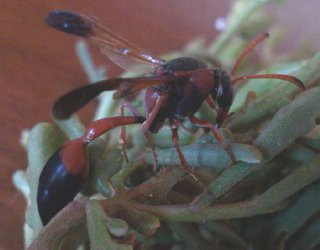
The hunting wasp Delta dimiatipenne

The island is home to one of the two surviving populations of the threatened Canarian Egyptian vulture. It is also inhabited by many wild dogs and cats. On the barren, rocky land there are barbary ground squirrels and geckos. Fuerteventura also hosts several migratory and nesting birds. The island has significant populations of the collared dove, common swifts and several finch species, especially in the vicinity of holiday developments.

Despite its arid climate, the island is also home to a surprisingly large insect fauna. Butterflies which commonly occur on the island include the clouded yellow (Colias hyale) and the bath white (Pontia daplidice) which feeds on xerophytic cruciferae. The island is also home to the monarch butterfly (Danaus plexippus) and its close African relative Danaus chrysippus. Around holiday developments, such as Caleta de Fuste, water is relatively abundant, and dragonfly species including the blue emperor (Anax imperator) and the scarlet darter (Crocothemis erythraea) can be found. The island's sand dunes and shoreline are home to a number of bee and wasp species, including the large eumenid caterpillar hunting wasp (Delta dimidiatipenne) and the blue banded bee (Amegilla canifrons).

Hawkmoths also occur on the island. One of the more notable species is Hyles tithymali which feeds on endemic spurges such as Euphorbia regis-jubae and Acherontia atropos. The deaths-head hawkmoth also occurs on the island, presumably feeding on members of the Solanaceae, like Datura innoxia and Nicotiana glauca, which are common weeds in the vicinity of human habitation.

== Natural symbols ==
The official natural symbols associated with Fuerteventura are Chlamydotis undulata fuertaventurae (hubara or houbara) and Euphorbia handiensis (Cardón de Jandía).

== Demographics ==
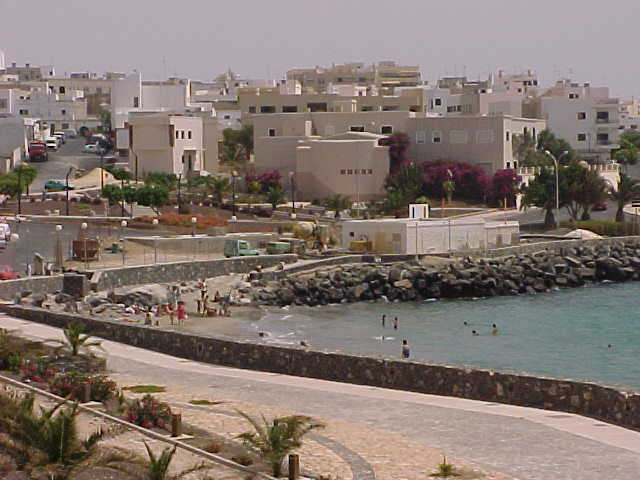
The People's University Building, a branch of UNED (Puerto del Rosario)

=== Population ===
The island had a population of 118,574 in 2018, 124,152 at the start of 2023, 127,043 in 2024, 129,451 in 2025 and 130,977 in 2026. It is the third most populated island in its province and the fourth in the archipelago, after Tenerife, Gran Canaria and Lanzarote.

Throughout its long history, Fuerteventura has suffered from a population decline due to the economic situation and the climate, which have made it into a desert island. However, the development of tourism during the 1980s has caused the population to grow year on year since then, doubling it in a little less than a decade.

In 2005, amongst its 86,642 registered inhabitants, the Fuerteventura population was formed by the following:

- Born on the island: 30,364
- Born on another Canary Island: 13,175
- Born elsewhere in Spain: 20,938
- Born in other countries: 22,165

Comparing this data with the 2001 census shows that the number of permanent residents born on the island has increased by just 3,000. The number who have moved in from abroad has increased by 22,910, making this the biggest contributor to population growth in recent years.

=== Education ===
The island has 116 schools, with a total of 14,337 pupils. Of these, 45 are primary schools, ten are secondary schools, six are for Baccalaureate students and four are vocational colleges.

Fuerteventura also has a centre linked with the National University of Distance Education, offering courses in many subjects including economics, business studies, law, history and tourism.

== Administration ==
Fuerteventura is governed by the Island Council of Fuerteventura, which holds the rank of a Government Subdepartment. The government building is located in the centre of the capital city.

This institution is charged with representing the Government of Spain on the island, and managing all the functions that are not under control of the Canarian Government. This includes the following public services:

- Island Security Forces (National Police and Guardia Civil)
- Puerto del Rosario port and Fuerteventura Airport
- Tax agency
- Customs
- Maritime and Coastguard department
- Driving licences, traffic and highways
- Immigration – the Immigration Detention Centre and residential permits
- Social Security
- Red Cross
- Seprona (the Nature Protection Service)
- Passports

Since 30 June 2007, the island's governor has been Eustaquio Juan Santana Gil.

=== Island Council of Fuerteventura (Cabildo) ===
The councils, formed as part of the Councils Act of 1912, administer the Canary Islands and have two principal functions. On one hand, they perform services for the Autonomous Community, and on the other, they are the local government centre for the island. In the 2003 elections, Mario Cabrera González of the Canarian Coalition was elected as president, with 31.02% of the votes, followed by Vice President Domingo Fuentes Curbelo, of the Spanish Socialist Workers' Party with 27.53%.

=== Municipalities ===
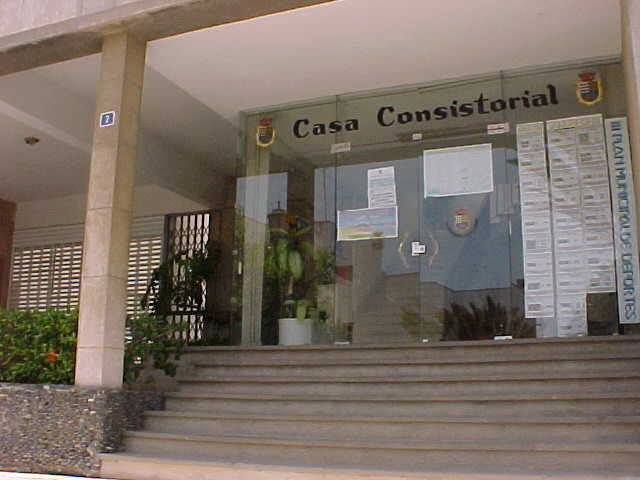
City Council of Puerto del Rosario

Fuerteventura is part of the Province of Las Palmas. The island is divided into six municipalities:

Name	Area (km^{2})	Census Population			Estimated Population (2023)
Name	Area (km^{2})	2001	2011	2021	Estimated Population (2023)
Antigua	250.56	5,519	10,391	12,782	13,513
Betancuria	103.64	685	770	755	811
La Oliva	356.13	10,548	22,827	27,503	29,174
Pájara	383.52	12,382	19,773	20,892	21,130
Puerto del Rosario	289.95	21,296	35,878	41,852	43,493
Tuineje	275.94	9,843	13,302	15,494	16,031
Totals	1,659.74	60,273	102,941	119,278	124,152

In turn, these municipalities are organised into two associations: the Mancomunidad de Municipios del Centro-Norte de Fuerteventura is formed from La Oliva and Puerto del Rosario, and the remaining municipalities make up the Mancomunidad de Municipios del Centro-Sur de Fuerteventura.

All municipalities are ruled by a town council, and are members of the FECAM (Federation of Canarian Municipalities). They are governed by the basic legislation of the local regime and their respective organic rules.

About 100 individual settlements are distributed through these municipalities. The largest non-municipal seats are Corralejo (in La Oliva; pop. 10,714 in 2023), Morro Jable (in Pájara; pop. 8,245) Gran Tarajal (in Tuineje; pop. 7,584), and Costa Calma (in Pájara; pop. 5,704), all coastal localities of recent development.

A nearby islet, Islote de Lobos, is close to Corralejo and part of the municipality of La Oliva.

== Economy ==
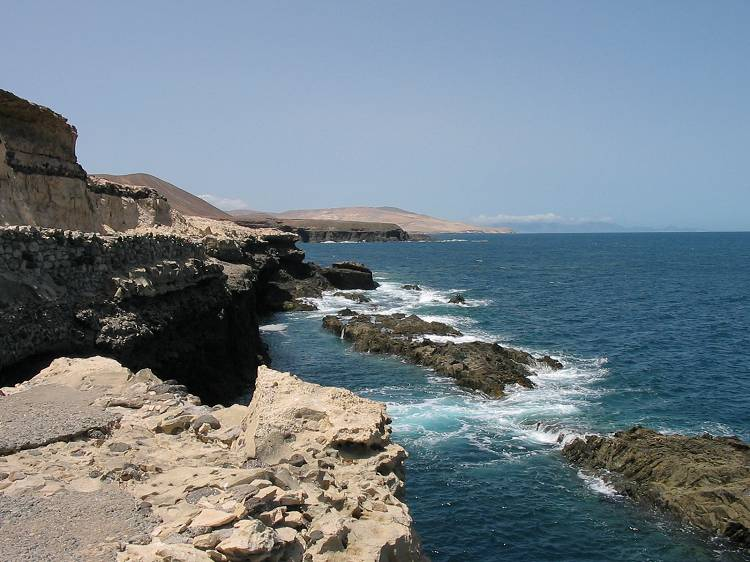
Fuerteventura coastline

During the 16th, 17th and 18th centuries, Fuerteventura and Lanzarote were the main exporters of wheat and cereals to the central islands of the archipelago: Tenerife and Gran Canaria. However, this trade was of little benefit to the inhabitants of Lanzarote and Fuerteventura, because the landowners of the islands profited from this activity. As such, periods of famine lead to some of the population of the islands moving to Tenerife and Gran Canaria to try to improve their lives. Therefore, the island of Tenerife became the main focus of attraction for majoreros and lanzaroteños, leading to the feeling of union that has always existed amongst these islands.

The economy of Fuerteventura is mainly based on tourism. Primary tourist areas are located around the existing towns of Corralejo in the north and Morro Jable in Jandia, plus the purely tourist development of Caleta de Fuste, south of Puerto del Rosario. Other main industries are fishing and agriculture (cereals and vegetables). The famous Majorero cheese is locally made from the milk of the indigenous majorera goat.

In 2009, Fuerteventura recorded the highest EU regional unemployment rate at a NUTS3 level, at 29.2 percent.

=== Tourism ===
The first tourist hotel was built in 1965, followed by the construction of Fuerteventura Airport at El Matorral, heralding the dawn of a new era for the island. As of 31 December 2005, there were a total of 117 hotel establishments and 58 non-hotel establishments on the island. One of the consequences of tourism has been the consequent increase in hospitality establishments, with 862 bars, 135 cafes and 482 restaurants registered on that same date.

Fuerteventura, with its 3,000 sunshine hours a year, was placed firmly on the world stage as a major European holiday destination. While having fully developed tourist facilities, the island has not experienced the overdevelopment found on some other islands. Nonetheless, it remains a destination for predominantly, but not exclusively, European tourists.

The summer Trade Winds and winter swells of the Atlantic make the island popular with surfers year-round, especially the more exposed areas on the north and west shores such as Corralejo and El Cotillo. Wind surfing takes places at locations around the island. Sailors, scuba divers and big-game fishermen enjoy the island's whales, dolphins, marlin and turtles. Hikers are also attracted to the island's many hills.

Sandy beaches are found in many locations. Western beaches, such as those around El Cotillo, can experience strong surf. The beaches adjoining the extensive sand dunes east of Corralejo are popular, as are the more protected extensive sandy shores of the Playa de Sotavento de Jandia on the southeastern coast between Costa Calma and the Morro Jable. Naked sun bathing and swimming are common on many of the beaches.

Much of the interior, with its large plains, lavascapes and volcanic mountains, consists of protected areas, although there are organised tours and vehicular access across them.

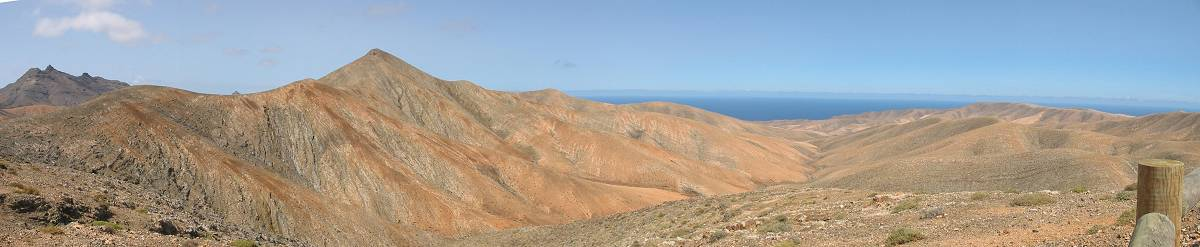
Mountaintop of Cardón (619 m), viewed from the west

== Art and culture ==
=== Traditional holidays ===
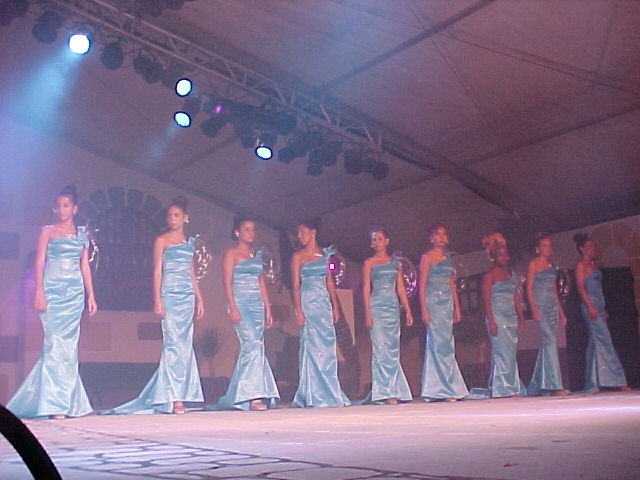
Candidates compete to be Queen of the Rose Festival in 2000 Puerto del Rosario.

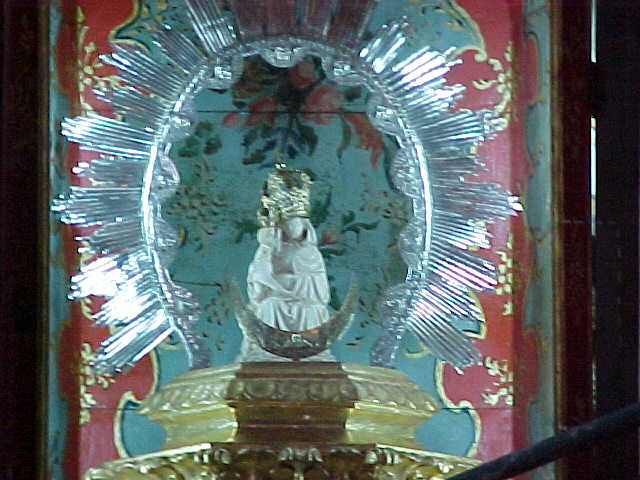
Alabaster image of the Virgen de la Peña (Patron saint of Fuerteventura)

Like the rest of the Canaries, Carnival is traditionally one of the biggest festivals celebrated on the island. Each town celebrates Carnival in different ways during February and March. These festivities have a different theme each year. They include activities such as parades and galas to choose the carnival king. Each municipality also has its own Saints Days.

Every year on the third Saturday of September, in Vega de Rio Palmas in Betancuria, festivities are held in honor of the Virgen de la Peña, patron saint of the island of Fuerteventura. Pilgrims come from all corners of the island.

On 8 September, the municipality of Antigua celebrates Our Lady of Antigua. In addition to concerts, fires and other activities, mass is celebrated at 1:00 p.m. which is followed by a wine of concord, ending with a procession of the Virgin around the church in the afternoon.

La Oliva's main celebration is held in February, in honor of the Virgin of Candelaria. Other celebrations are the Carmen festivities, in Corralejo, with their corresponding pilgrimage, and the festivities in honor of Our Lady of Sorrows and San Miguel Arcángel, celebrated in La Caldereta at the end of September and beginning of October

In the days around 7 October, Puerto del Rosario has festivities in honor of Our Lady of the Rosary. During this time there are concerts and festivals, fairgrounds and a pilgrimage.

Tuineje celebrates a large number of patron saint, with pilgrimages and Ranchos de Ánimas. However, the festivities in honor of Saint Michael the Archangel stand out, celebrated around 29 September and 13 October. These festivals have their origin in the oath sworn to the saint after the victory in the Battle of Tamasite in 1740. This is also where the re-enactments of the failed English invasions are held.

=== Concerts and festivals ===
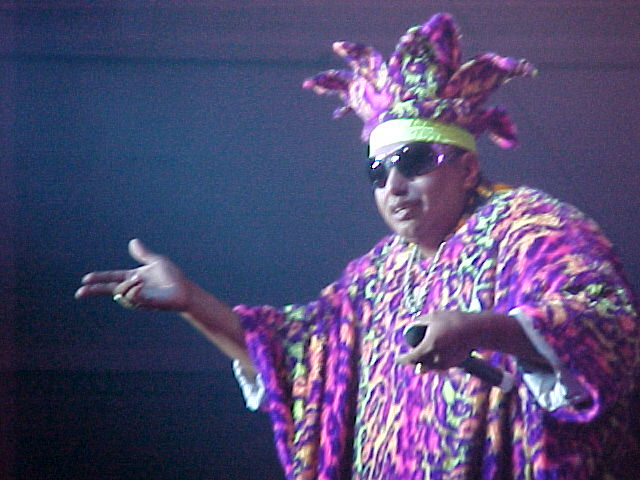
King África in Puerto del Rosario in September 2000

There are many concerts and festivals held in the auditoriums, such as the Festival of Canarian Music. They are also held in smaller venues across the island, featuring bands such as Estopa, Van Gogh's Ear, and King Africa.

- Lebrancho Rock: in 2004, the Town Hall of Puerto del Rosario started this initiative for the growing number of local bands who had been performing in the area for years but had not had the chance to play at the same event.
- Fuertemusica: like Lebrancho Rock, this festival aims to encourage the local or emerging groups. It started in the same year. This festival is mainly for groups that are already known in the music world. It takes place in El Cotillo.

The Festival Internacional de Cometas (International Kite Festival) is held on the second week of November each year, centering on the Corralejo Beaches. It attracts kite fliers and kite surfers from all over Europe. It is popular because the winds are warm and constant and the beaches become filled with hundreds of colourful kites of all shapes and sizes.

=== Auditoriums ===
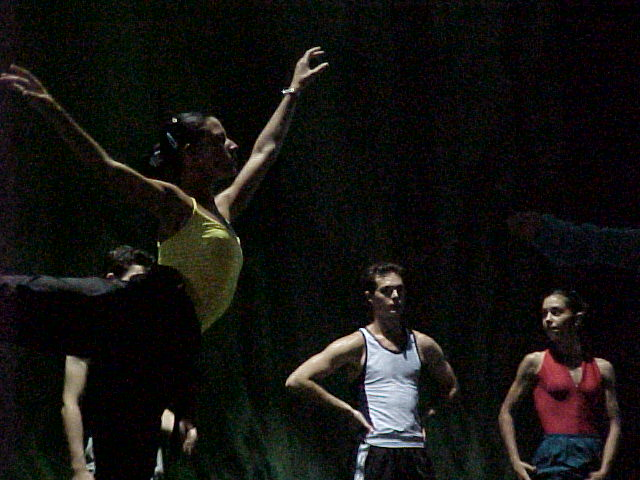
Members of the National Dance Company in the Puerto del Rosario Auditorium on 25 July 2000

Fuerteventura has three auditoriums. These are used for all types of performing art, as well as non-artistic purposes, such as conferences, charity galas and political meetings.

- The Isle of Fuerteventura Auditorium
- Gran Tarajal Auditorium
- Corralejo Auditorium

=== Central library ===
The Central Library of the Island is located in Antigua's city centre, in the public university. In addition to providing traditional library services, it has a 180-seat multipurpose room, air conditioning, a wifi zone, and a multimedia room used for seminars, presentations, film festivals etc.

=== Museums and exhibition spaces ===
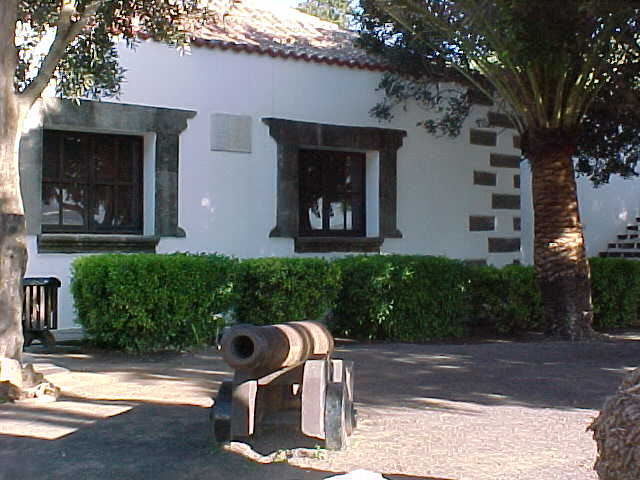
The museum in Betancuria

The island has several museums with different themes and plenty of exhibition spaces, both public and private. These include:

- The House of Colonels
- The Antigua Windmill Craft Centre
- The Salt Museum
- The Atalayita Archeological Interpretation Centre
- Betancuria Museum

=== Sculpture park ===
In addition to the museums, the capital has an open-air sculpture park consisting of around 100 sculptures by different artists scattered across the city. Most of them were created for the International Symposium of Sculpture, celebrated annually since 2001. During the festival, artists come from all over the world to erect their sculptures in the open air, in full view of passers by.

== Main sights ==
Sites of interest in the north include Corralejo and El Jable, which are made up of fine sand dunes, whilst the south is filled with long beaches and remote bays. The constant winds blowing onto the beaches provide a paradise for windsurfing. Surfing is common on the west and north coasts where there are large waves. Windsurfing is common around Corralejo and Playas de Sotavento and wave sailing (windsurfing on the waves) on the coast along the northern half of the island. El Cotillo is a small fishing village in the north-west of the island, famous for a very long beach to the south of the village and a few very calm beaches to the north. The northern beaches, frequented by snorkeling enthusiasts and sun worshippers alike, are referred to as lakes by the locals.

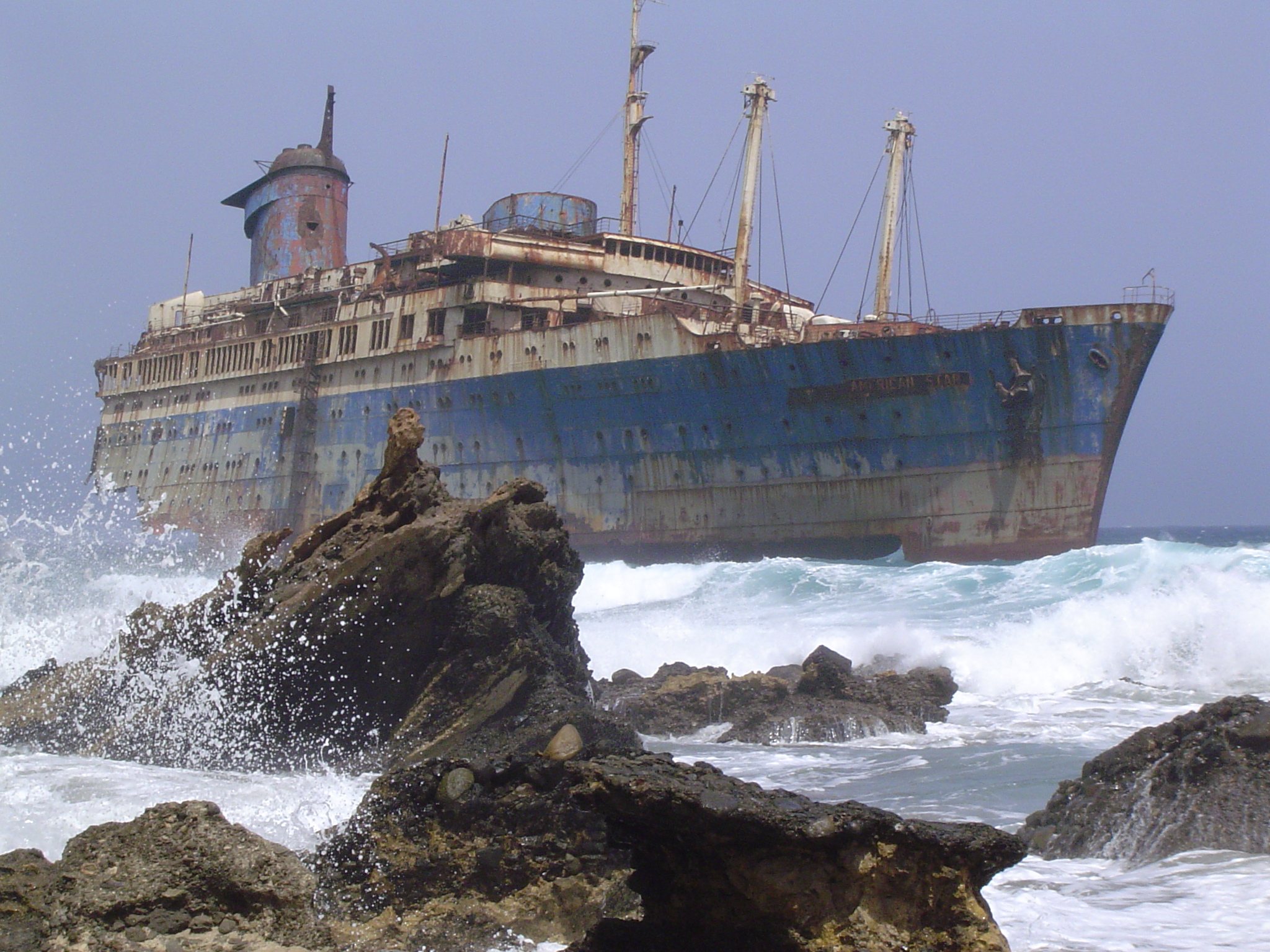
The wreck of American Star (SS America) seen in July 2004 from land side

At Cofete on the western side of Jandía, a remote and imposing house – Villa Winter – looks out to sea across wide beaches. It was reputedly built by Gustav Winter on land given by Generalisimo Franco.

For a time, the beaches were home to a popular accidental attraction. On 18 January 1994, the United States Lines ocean liner SS American Star (formerly America, USS West Point, Australis) was beached in Playa de Garcey during a severe storm. Within a year, she broke in two and later lost her stern. By 2007, the rest of the severely deteriorated ship had collapsed onto her port side, gradually keeling over further and almost completely submerged. By 2008–2012, most of the remains finally slipped below the surface.

== Food ==
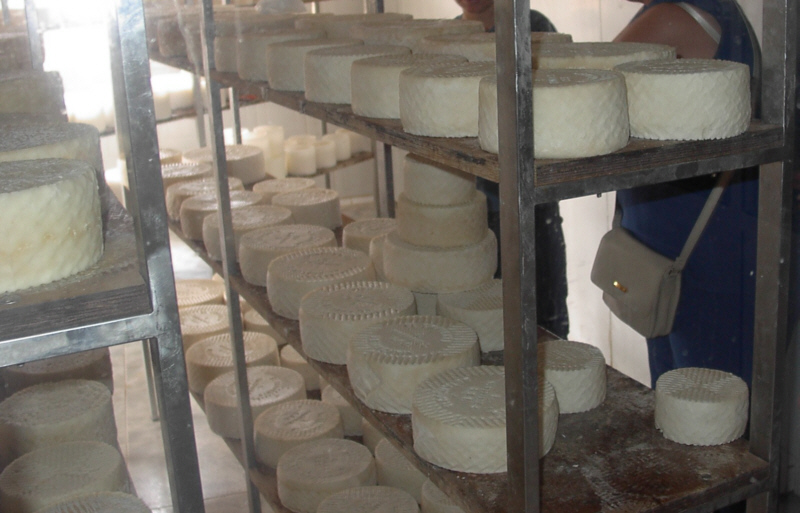
Majorera cheese

The cuisine is fairly basic, due to the customs and climate conditions. They share this simplicity with the other Canary islands, and similarly to them, they use a large quantity of fish. They also use whatever they can grow in the near-barren land. This includes papas arrugadas, a dish of wrinkled potatoes usually served with mojo, which is a hot pepper sauce, or puchero canario, a meat stew.

Seafood is prepared in many traditional ways, such as pejines (salted fish), jareas (sun-dried fish) or sancocho (stew) made from fish, generally the grouper, corvina or sama, boiled after salting, and served with mojo, potatoes, or gofio (a type of grain). People are also very keen on the mussels and limpets collected on the island's coasts.

They also use meat, such as beef and pork, to make different dishes or simply for braising, but their main meat is goat, both kids and older animals. They eat the goat roasted or stewed. Goats are not only useful for their meat – the Fuerteventurans also use the milk to make the cheese majorero, which has won many prizes. The majorero is mostly made of goats milk, but occasionally is up to 15% ewe's milk. It is cured in pimento oil or gofio meal. Majorero and palmero cheese are the only two Canarian cheeses with protected denomination of origin.

== Transport and communications ==
The main methods of arriving and departing the islands are by flying and by ferry.

=== Airports ===
The airport is the main access point to the island. It is situated in El Matorral, 5 km (3.1 mi) southwest of the capital city Puerto del Rosario. The airport has flight connections to over 80 destinations worldwide, and over 5.6 million passengers passed through it in 2016. In 1994, the new airport terminal was constructed. In December 2009, the new facilities of the arrivals terminal of Fuerteventura Airport were inaugurated, tripling the space available in the old facilities. Up to 4000 passengers per hour can be served concurrently thanks to the new facilities.

Notably, Binter Canarias serves the airport as the regional airline connecting passengers across the Canary Islands.

=== Ports ===
Fuerteventura has four ports: Puerto del Rosario, Corralejo, Gran Tarajal and Morro Jable. Cargo operations are the main activity of the island's main port in Puerto del Rosario, although its facilities allow the docking of tourist cruises, including a ferry from Gran Canaria. Passenger traffic is mainly channeled through Corralejo, Gran Tarajal and Morro Jable. The port of Corralejo connects the island with Lanzarote, the port of Gran Tarajal connects the island with Gran Canaria, and Morro Jable connects the island with Gran Canaria and Tenerife.

=== Roads ===
There are two highways on the island: FV-1 and FV-2. FV-1, together with FV-2, is part of the major construction project of the north–south motorway on Fuerteventura.

The FV-1 begins in the north, in the town of Corralejo and ends in the island's capital Puerto del Rosario. FV-1 is part dual carriageway and part single carriageway. In the past, FV-1 also ran through the Corralejo Dune Nature Reserve. In order to direct through traffic out of the nature reserve, the dual carriageway bypass around the nature reserve was opened in 2017 as the first section of the motorway, after three years of construction, plus five years of construction delay. The road through the nature reserve was renamed FV-104.

FV-2 connects Morro Jable and Puerto del Rosario. Between La Lajita and Morro Jable, FV-2 is a dual carriageway highway. Car rental companies that have offices in the airports are Autoreisen, Avis, Cicar, Europcar, Goldcar, Hertz, Sixt and TopCar.

== Sport ==
Many sports are commonly played in Fuerteventura, both in the open air and in sports centres across the island.

=== Native sports ===
These are the Canarian sports found on the island:

==== Canarian wrestling ====
Canarian wrestling takes place in a ring of sand called the terrero. Inside it, the two contestants try to knock each other over. Fuerteventura has 14 terreros, distributed through all the towns except Betancuria:

- Antigua: Terrero de Antigua.
- La Oliva: Terrero Venancio Guerra and Terrero de Villaverde.
- Pájara: Terrero Miguel Díaz La Lajita, Terrero de Morro Jable a Terrero de Pájara.
- Puerto del Rosario: Terrero de Casillas del Angel, Terrero Manuel Nieves, Terrero de Puerto Cabras, Terrero de Tefía a Terrero de Tetir.
- Tuineje: Terrero de Gran Tarajal, Terrero de Tamasite, and Terrero Pedro Sánchez in Tarajalejo.

The island also has a school wrestling league, organized by the council, and a programme to promote this sport in clubs. Twelve wrestling schools participate in this, based in Antigua, Costa Calma, El Matorral, La Lajita, Lajares, Las Playitas, Morro Jable, Puerto del Rosario, Tefía, Tetir, Unión Sur and Villaverde.

==== Juego del Palo ====
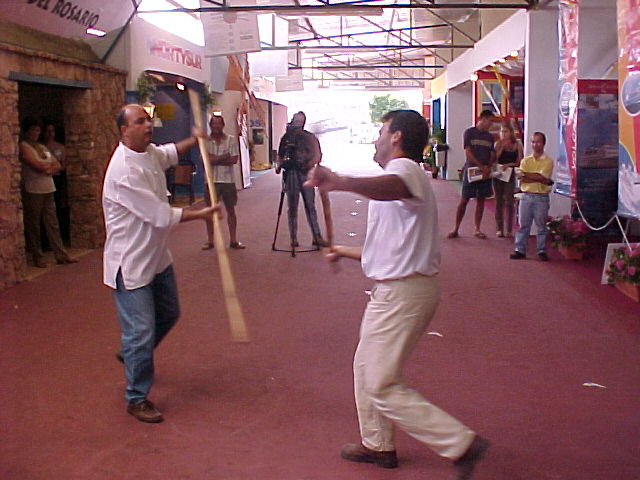
An exhibition during FEDETUR 2000, in Pozo Negro (Antigua) on 23 September 2000

Juego del Palo is a Canarian martial art which literally translates as "game of the stick". It is played by two players, both armed with sticks. They aim to defeat each other without making contact with their opponent's body. The origin of this game is unclear, but it is likely based on a method of combat used by the precolonial Canarian people.

Fuerteventura has the following Palo clubs:

- Club-Escuela Dunas de Corralejo.
- Club-Escuela Huriamen de Villaverde.
- Club-Escuela Puerto Cabras.
- Asociación del Juego del Palo Canario MAHO.
- Club-Escuela Sorinque de Gran Tarajal.

==== Canarian boules ====
This is a similar game to the French Pétanque, which is actually played very little on the island, although there are a few teams and courts. The game consists of scoring points by throwing a ball as near as possible to an object called a mingue or boliche. It is played on a rectangular sand or earth pitch which is 18 to 25 m (59.1–82.0 ft) long and 3.5 to 6 m (11.5–19.7 ft) wide.

=== Watersports ===
==== Surfing, windsurfing and kitesurfing ====
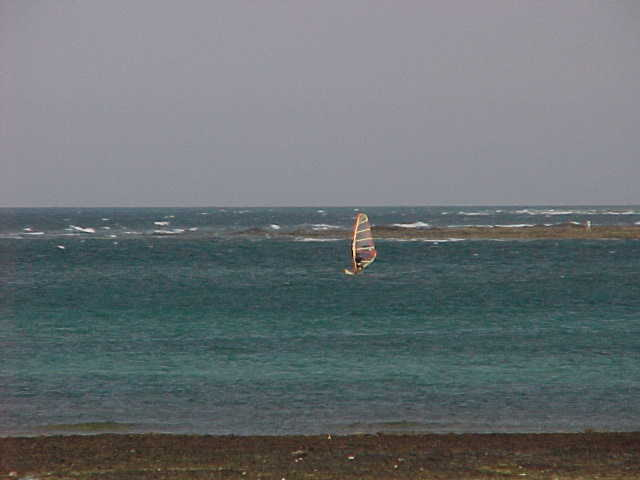
Windsurfing in Corralejo

The International Windsurfing and Kiteboarding Championship has run since 1985, and is held at Playas de Sotavento in Pájara municipality.

==== Diving ====
Two diving areas are the coast off Playa del Matorral in the South, and the zone between Lobos Island and Corralejo in the north.

==== Swimming ====
There is an annual swim from Lobos Island to Fuerteventura, held every year since 1999. The event attracts amateur swimmers from all over the Canaries and Spain, as well as swimming professionals such as David Meca,Maarten van der Weijden, and the Paralympians Jesús Collado Alarcón, who won gold medals for 100m backstroke and butterfly in Athens 2004, and Xavi Torres Ramis, who medalled in Barcelona, Sydney and Atlanta.

==== Sailing ====
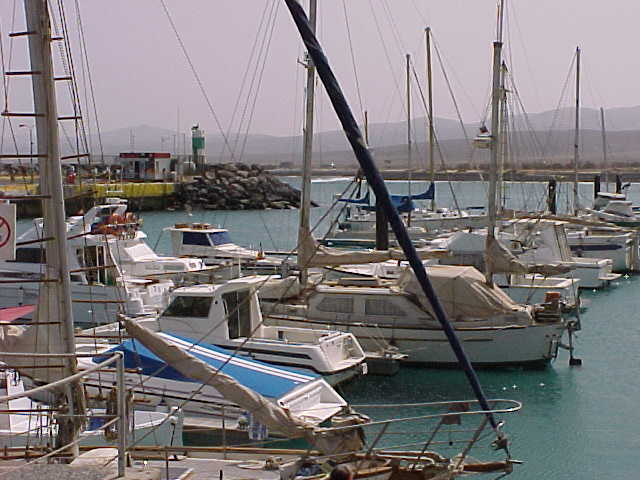
The harbour at Caleta de Fuste (Antigua)

The island holds competitions involving different types of boat, such as the lateen and the optimist.

=== Other sports ===
From 2004 to 2014, the Marcha Ciclotourista was held in La Oliva. Electron Fuertebike has been annually in La Oliva since 2014, and the Marcha Cicloturista Faro Fuerteventura, which goes across the island, started in 2021. The Criterium Ciclista was held from 2004-2008 in Corralejo. Participants included Euskaltel–Euskadi, T-Mobile and a team from Orbea. These competitions contributed to local interest in the sport and the first professional local team, the Fuerteventura–Canarias, was formed, initially run by Óscar Guerrero, director of Kaiku, although it disbanded in 2008.

There are various motocross circuits on the island, including Los Alares in Antigua and Isla de Fuerteventura in Puerto del Rosario. They hold regular trials, some of which form part of the Canarian Regional Motocross Championship. Throughout the year, there are gravel rally races. Two of these are part of the Canarian Dirt Rally Championship: the Antiguan Rally and the La Oliva Rally.

The island's main football clubs are CD Union Puerto and CD Cotillo, who compete in the Interinsular Preferente League.

The Playitas resort on the south coast has, since around 2008, been equipped with a 50 m (160 ft) swimming pool and has become a destination for triathlon training camps for Europeans. An annual race called Challenge Fuerteventura is held there on the half ironman distance.

== Notable people ==
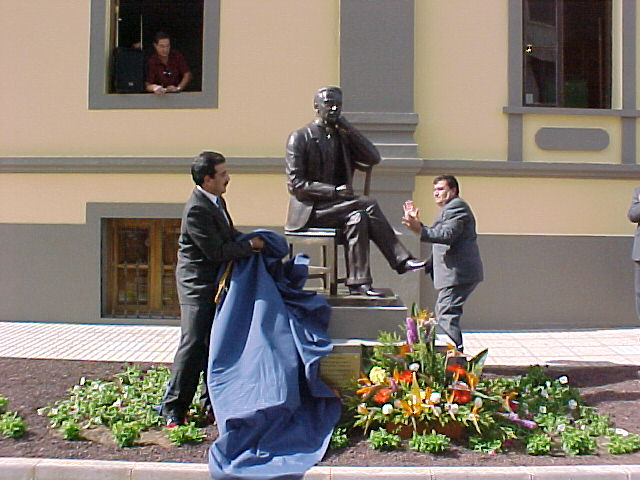
Inauguration of the statue by Emiliano Hernández in honour of Manuel Velázquez Cabrera on 8 November 2001

- Manuel Velázquez Cabrera: born in Tiscamanita in 1863, the politician and lawyer who created the island's council.
- Juan Ismael: painter, cartoonist and poet born in La Oliva in 1907, considered one of the great Canarian surrealists.
- Eustaquio Gopar: born in Tuineje in 1866. He was one of the Spanish soldiers involved in the Siege of Baler, together with Major Rafael Alonso Mederos, who died of beri-beri during the siege. On his return, Eustaquio became mayor over his native people. He held this post both during the republic and under Franco.

== See also ==
- Geology of the Canary Islands
- List of volcanoes in Spain
