= Island Council of Fuerteventura =

Leadership
- President: Lola García since 26 June 2023

Structure
- Seats: 23 councillors
- Political groups: Government (13) CC PSOE Opposition (10) PP NC-FAC AMF

Elections
- Last election: 2023 Fuerteventura Island Council election

Website
- (http://www.cabildofuer.es/cabildo/)

The Island Council of Fuerteventura is the governmental and administrative body specific to the Canary Islands. It mainly fulfills two functions: it provides services and exercises powers of the autonomous community and it is the local authority that governs the island. Currently, Lola García, from Asamblea Majorera – Coalición Canaria Fuerteventura, is the president of the highest island institution. She has been re-elected for a second term during the tenth legislature of the democratic period. This constitutes a historic milestone for Fuerteventura, as she became the first woman to hold this office.

== Departments ==
At present, to carry out its functions, the Island Council of Fuerteventura has the following departments:

- Presidency, Commerce, Museum Network, Institutional Relations and Relations with Other Administrations, International Cooperation
- Water, Waste and Territorial Planning
- Social Affairs, Health, Consumer Affairs, Housing and Immigration
- Culture and Historical Heritage
- Sports and Hunting
- Industry, Energy, Classified Activities and Public Shows
- Economy, Finance and New Technologies
- Agriculture, Livestock and Fisheries
- Environment and Infrastructure
- Education and Youth
- Security and Emergencies
- Internal Affairs, Personnel and Heritage
- Transport and Communications
- Tourism

== List of presidents of the Island Council of Fuerteventura ==
The presidents of the council have been:

- Juan Domínguez Peña (1913–1916)
- José Castañeyra Carballo (1916–1920)
- Secundino Alonso Alonso (1920–1924)
- Casto Martínez Gallego (1924–1925)
- Francisco Medina Berriel (1925–1930)
- Lorenzo Castañeyra Schamann (1930–1931)
- Jerónimo Velázquez Curbelo (1931–1933)
- Luis de San Pío Herrera Rodríguez (1933–1934)
- Francisco García Sanabria (1934–1936)
- Luis de San Pío Herrera Rodríguez (second term, March 1936 – July 1936)
- Manuel Sánchez Évora (July 1936 – November 1936)
- Ramón Peñate Castañeyra (November 1936 – March 1938)
- Lorenzo Castañeyra Schamann (second term, 1938–1955)
- Roque Calero Fajardo (1953–1958)
- Guillermo Sánchez Velázquez (1958–1971)
- Santiago Hormiga Domínguez (1971 – May 1976)
- Casto Martínez Soto (1976–1979)

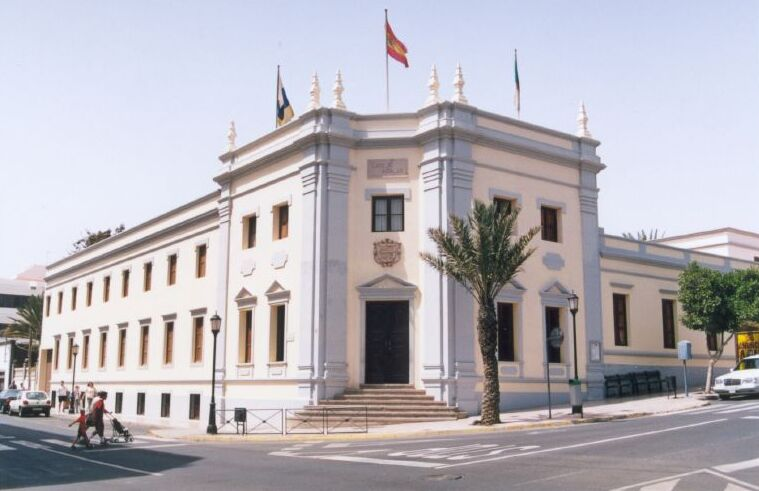
Building of the Island Council of Fuerteventura

=== Democratic period ===
No.	Name	Start	End	Party
1.	Gerardo Mesa Noda (1935)	1979	1987	AM-CC
2.	José Juan Herrera Velázquez (1945)	1987	1995	AM-CC
3.	Ildefonso Chacón Negrín (1939–2008) (Fonfín)	1995	1999	IF
4.	José Juan Herrera Velázquez (2nd term)	1999	2003	AM-CC
5.	Mario Cabrera González (1963)	2003	2015	AM-CC
6.	Marcial Morales	2015	2019	AM-CC
7.	Dolores García Martínez	2019	2019	AM-CC
8.	Blas Acosta	2019	2021	AM-CC
9.	Sergio Lloret	2021	2023	AMF
10.	Dolores García Martínez	2023	2027	AM-CC

== Possible coalitions in 2023 ==
Majorero politics has been marked by instability; however, several analysts consider that the most likely scenario for the next legislature would be a coalition of Coalición Canaria, led by Lola García, with the People's Party, led by Claudio Gutiérrez or Jéssica de León, excluding the Municipal Assemblies of Fuerteventura. Another, less likely, possibility is a coalition of the PSC-PSOE with Podemos, Nueva Canarias, Asamblea Majorera, and others. In 2023, AMF is believed not to be decisive in forming a government.
