= Juan Ismael =

Spanish painter

- Born: 19 December 1907; La Oliva, Fuerteventura
- Died: 24 August 1981 (aged 73); Las Palmas, Gran Canaria
- Known for: Painting, Drawing, Sculpture, Photography, Ceramics, Poetry, Essays
- Movement: Surrealism

Juan Ismael (19 December 1907 – 24 August 1981) was a Spanish multidisciplinary artist, commemorated by the Juan Ismael Arts Centre in Puerto del Rosario.

== Early life ==
Juan Ismael was born in La Oliva, Fuerteventura, but his family moved to Tenerife when he was a child. He received artistic training at the Escuelas de Artes y Oficios de Santa Cruz until he was 16.

He moved to work in a photographic laboratory in Las Palmas at 20 years old, on the death of his father. That was where he acquired his photographic skill.

== Spain ==
At the age of 20, he came into contact with the Luján Pérez school, a laboratory of artistic experimentation. He moved to the Spanish mainland and was linked with the intense cultural life of the 1930s and 40s in Madrid and Barcelona. He attended classes on ceramics and painting. His first solo exhibition was at the Mars Theatre in La Palmas in 1928.

He died of cardiac arrest in Las Palmas in 1981.
