= Costa Calma =

Resort town in the Canary Islands

Coordinates: 28°09′43″N 14°13′41″W

Costa Calma is a beach holiday resort town in the Canarian island of Fuerteventura, Spain. It is part of the municipality Pájara, and has 5,670 inhabitants (2013). Costa Calma is located in the beginning of the Jandía peninsula in the southern part of the island.

Costa Calma, or the calm coast, got its name from the fact that the prevailing western winds normally leave this part of the coast and its waters protected and calm.

Costa Calma was developed as a tourist community in the 1970s. A site of interest near Costa Calma is Sotavento Beach, which has been the location of several windsurfing championships.

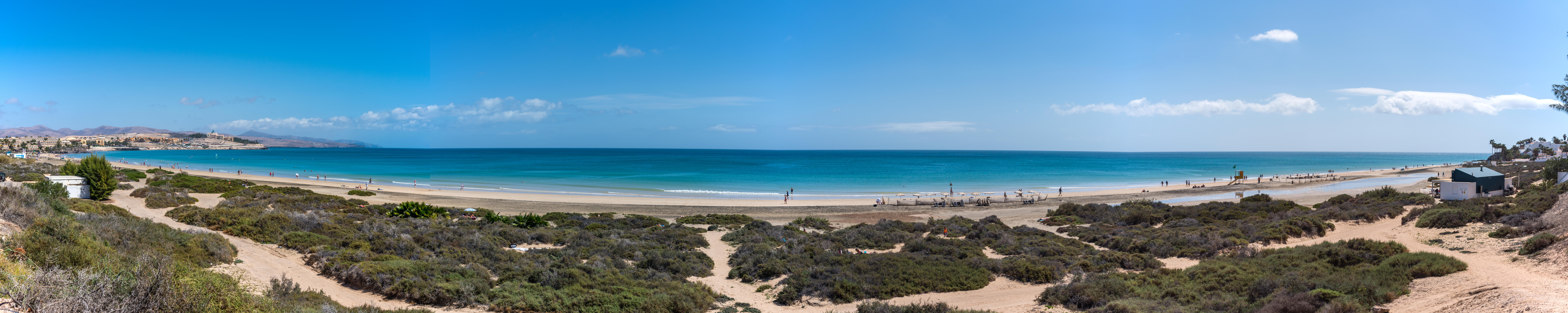
Costa Calma beach
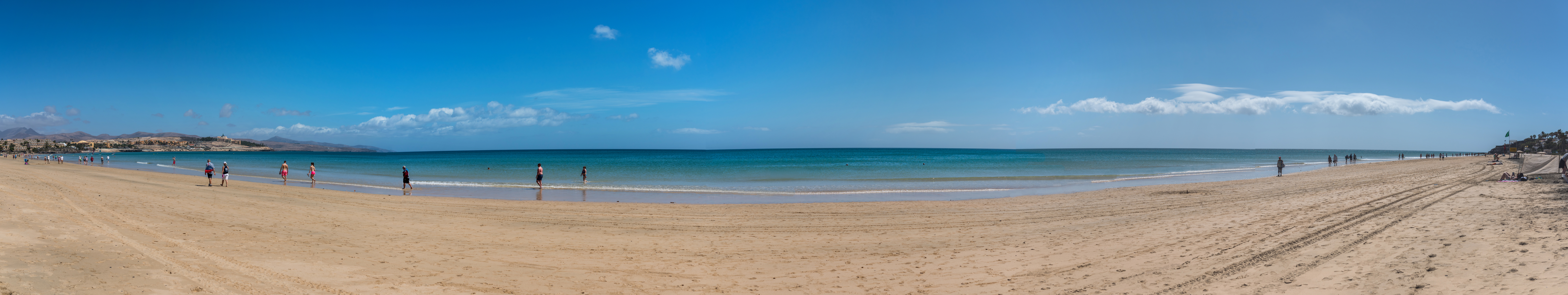
Costa Calma's long, sandy beach

== Gallery ==
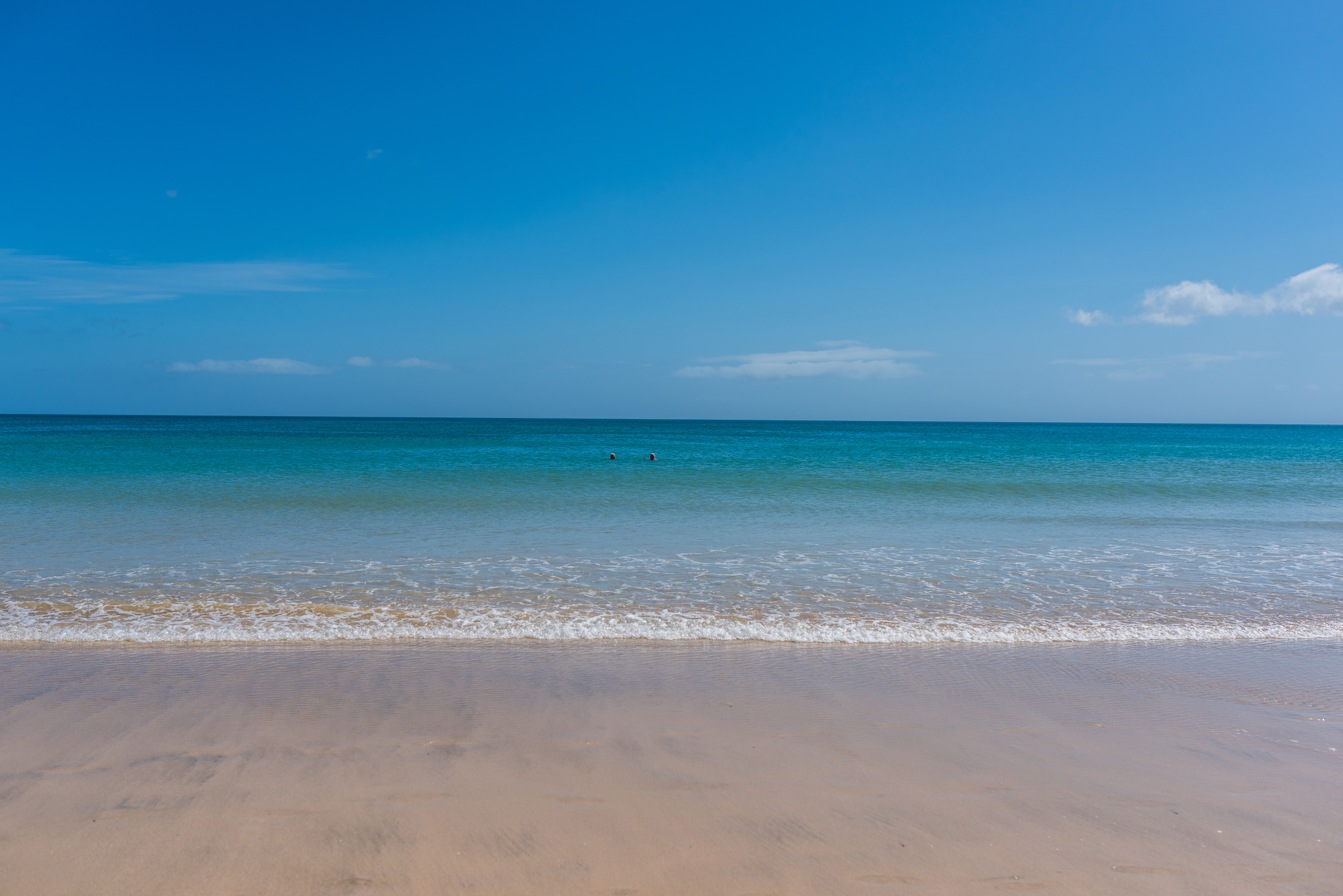
Costa Calma beach

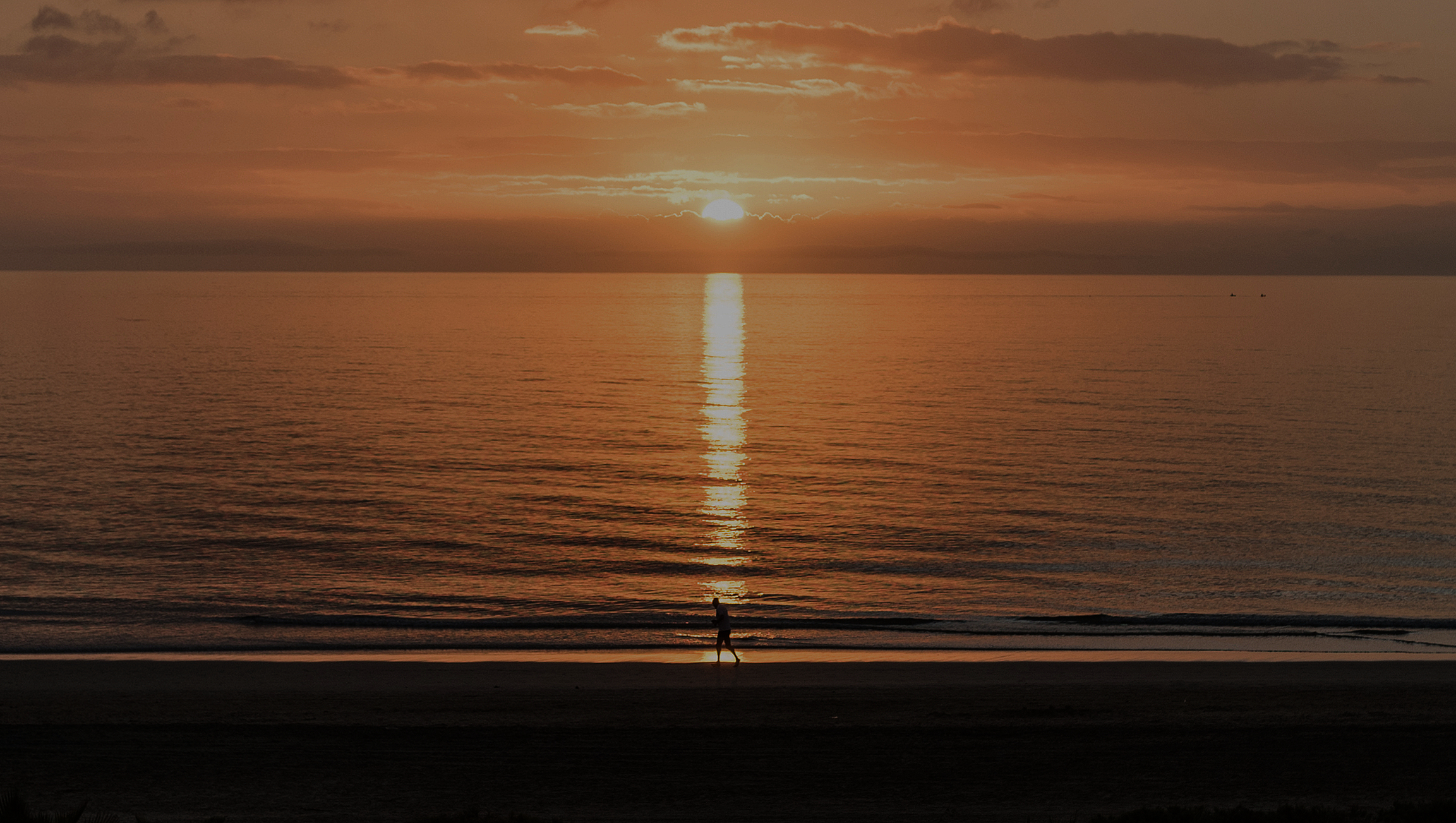
Sunrise over Costa Calma

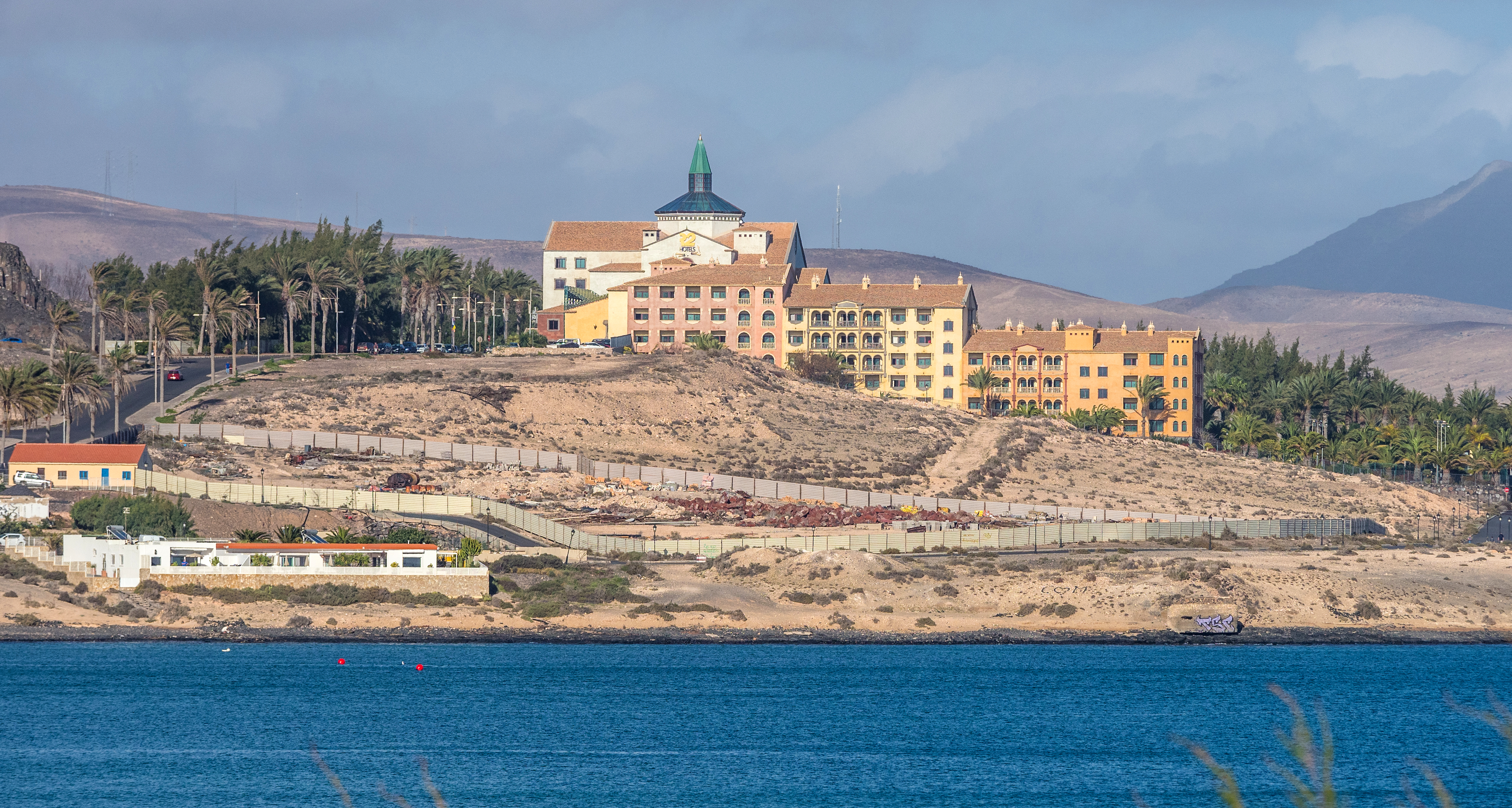
Costa Calma beach resort

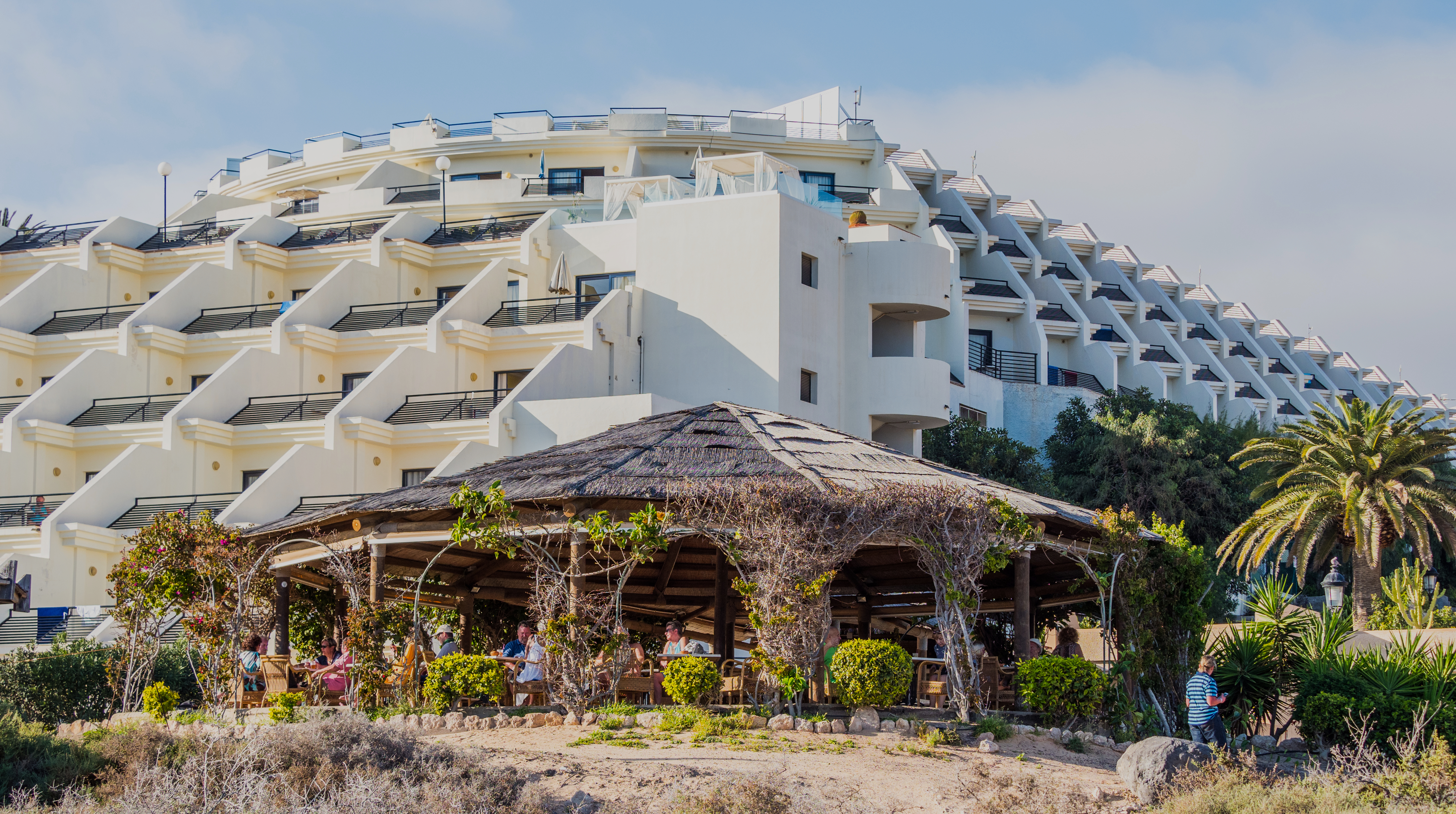
Costa Calma beach hotel

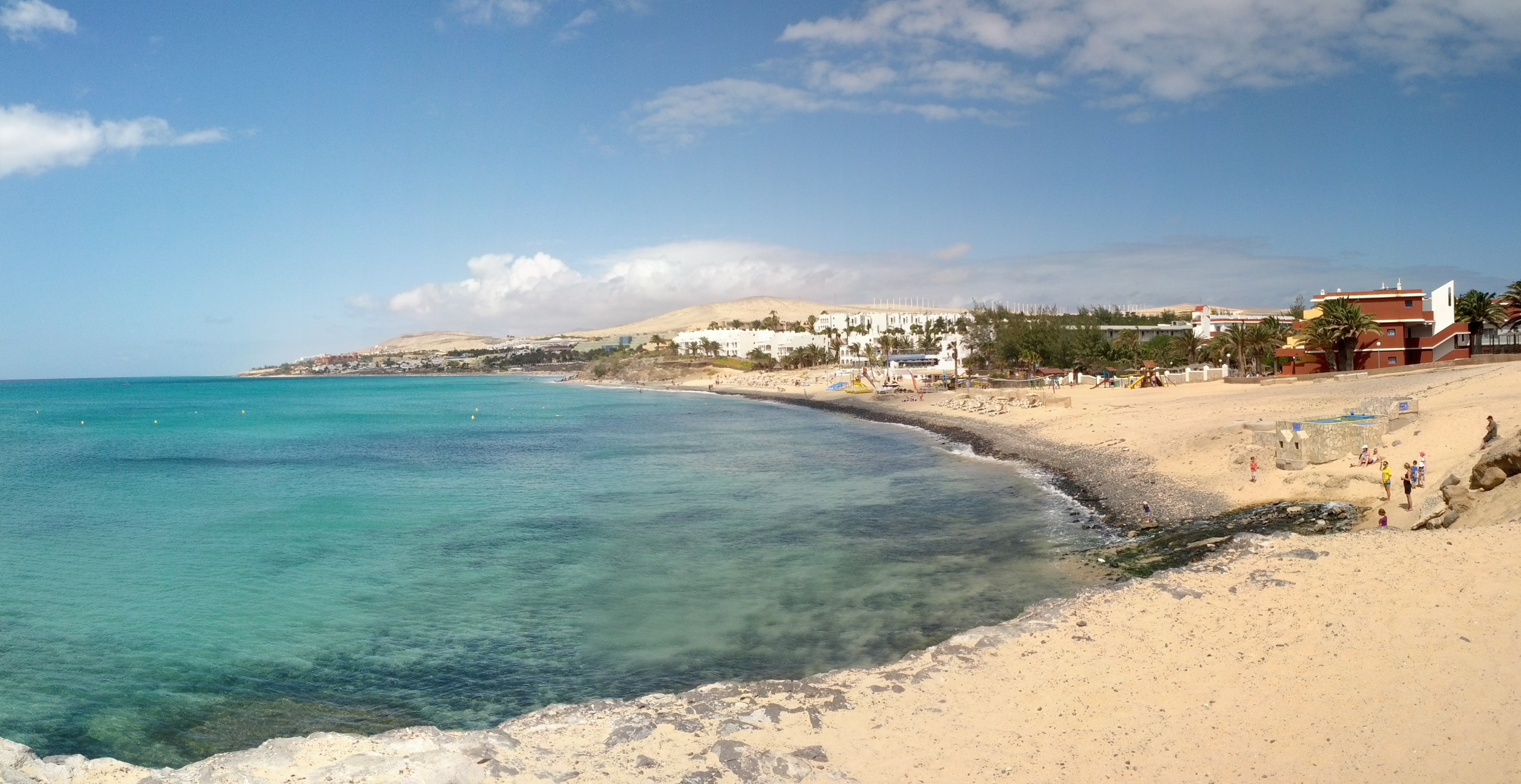
Northern beach in Costa Calma

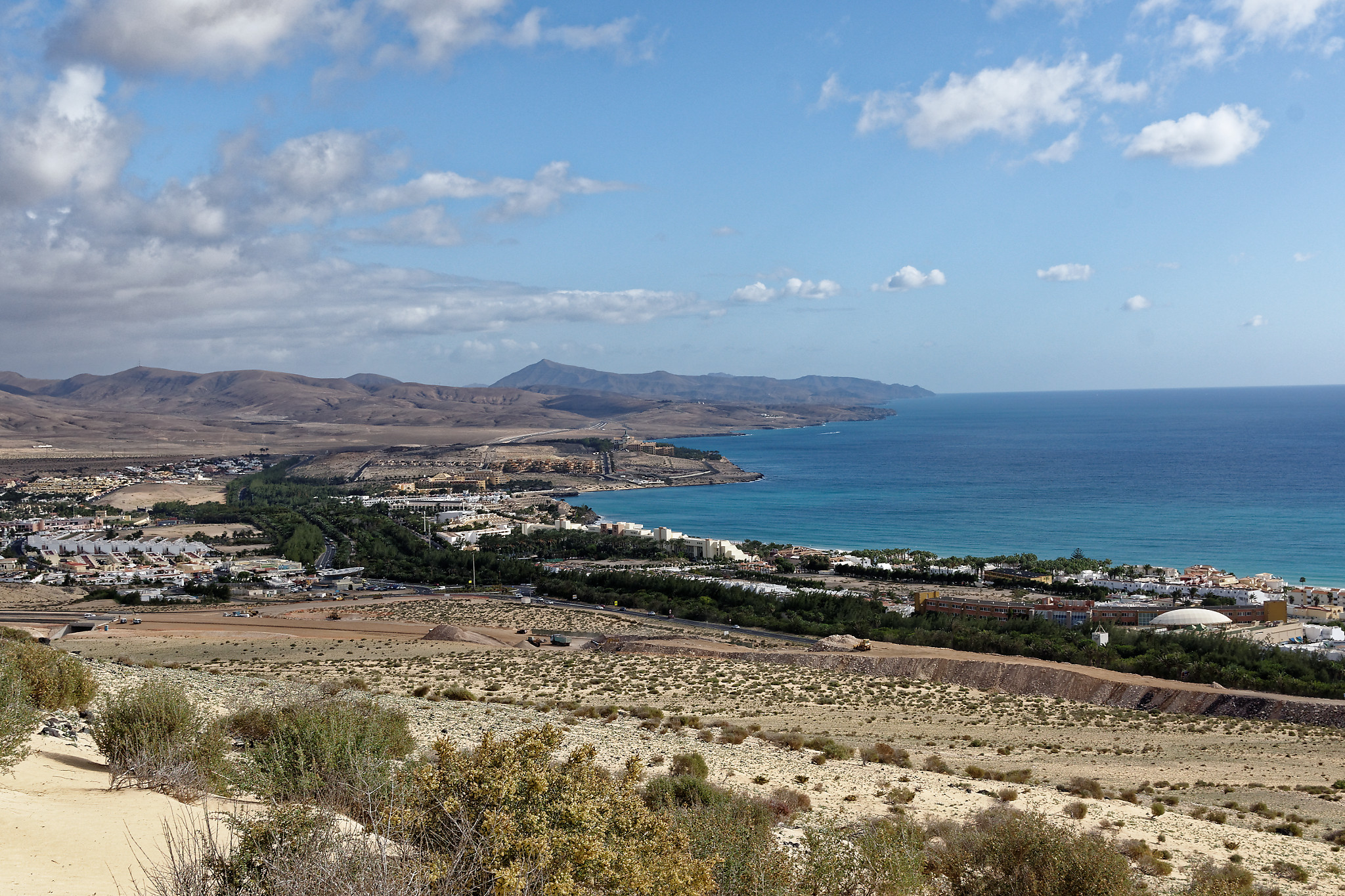
Panorama

Wind turbines west of Costa Calma beach
