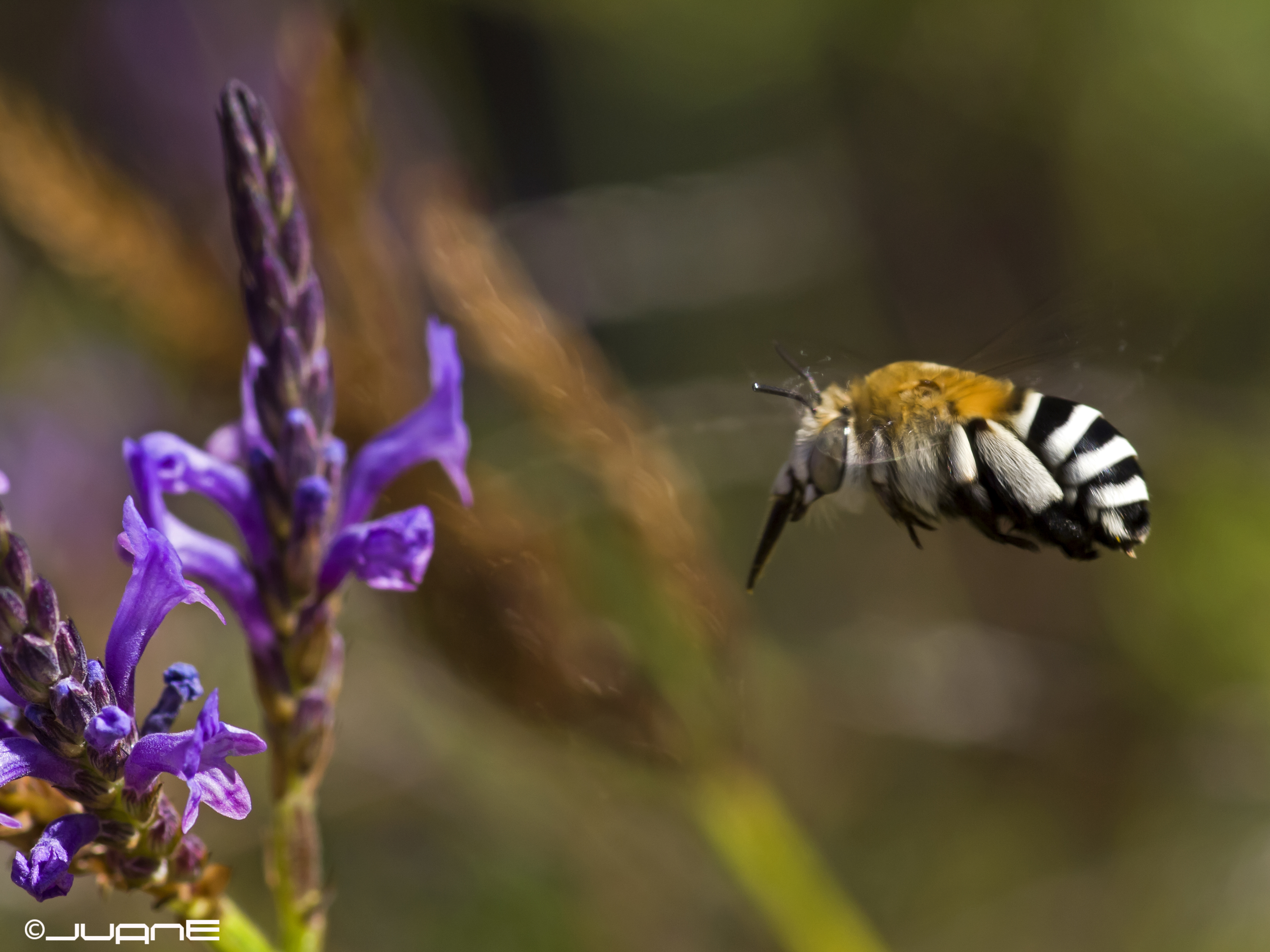

Conservation status
- Least Concern (IUCN 3.1)

Scientific classification
- Kingdom: Animalia
- Phylum: Arthropoda
- Class: Insecta
- Order: Hymenoptera
- Family: Apidae
- Genus: Amegilla
- Species: A. canifrons

Binomial name
- Amegilla canifrons (Smith, 1854)

Synonyms
- Anthophora canifrons Smith, 1854

= Amegilla canifrons =

Species of bee from Canary Islands

Amegilla canifrons, the Canary islands Blue-banded bee is a species of bee, belonging to the family Apidae. The species is endemic to Canary Islands.
