= Socialist Canarian Party =

Socialist Canarian Party (Spanish: Partido Canario Socialista or PCS) was a political party in Lanzarote, Canary Islands, Spain. It was registered with the election authorities in 1995.

The party presented a list to the 1995 Island elections, led by Edilia Soraya Noda Ramos. The party obtained 325 votes (0.98% of the votes in Lanzarote). Most of the votes were cast in Arrecife, where the party got 220 votes (1.41%). In Tías the party got 56 votes (1.56%).

In the 1995 municipal elections, the Socialist Canarian Party contested two municipalities, Arrecife and Tías. In Arrecife the party got 195 votes (1.25%). It got 42 votes in Tías (1.17%), but no seats in either municipality.
