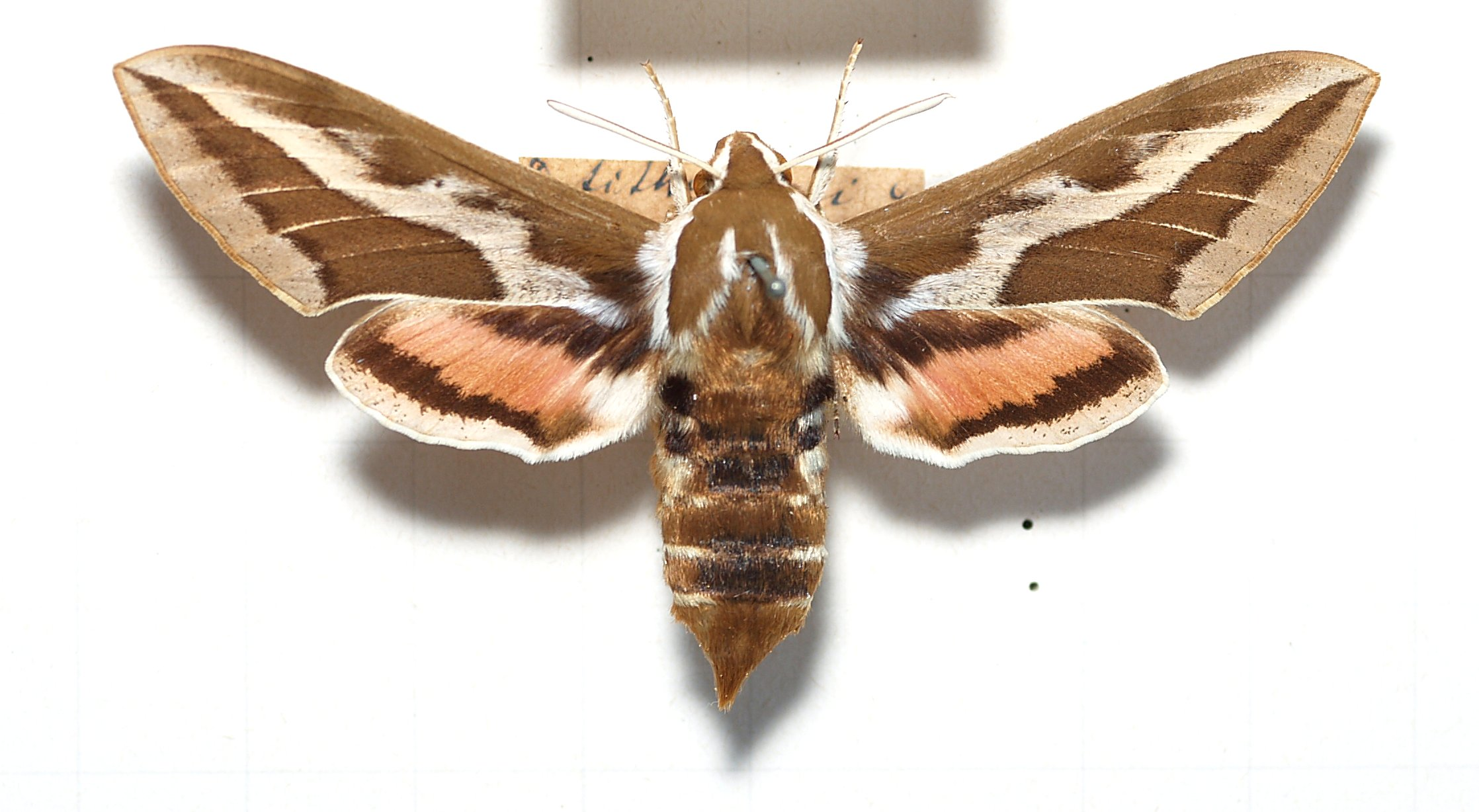

Scientific classification
- Kingdom: Animalia
- Phylum: Arthropoda
- Class: Insecta
- Order: Lepidoptera
- Family: Sphingidae
- Genus: Hyles
- Species: H. tithymali

Binomial name
- Hyles tithymali (Boisduval, 1834)

Synonyms
- Deilephila tithymali Boisduval, 1834; Deilephila calverleyi Grote, 1865; Hyles cretica; Celerio deserticola saharae Günther, 1939; Celerio euphorbiae albeola Stauder, 1913; Celerio euphorbiae cingulata Stauder, 1913; Celerio euphorbiae extensa Closs, 1917; Celerio euphorbiae reverdini Stauder, 1913; Celerio euphorbiae rosea Closs, 1917; Celerio euphorbiae satanella Stauder, 1913; Celerio euphorbiae velutina Stauder, 1913; Celerio mauretanica dealbata Schultz, 1911; Celerio mauretanica flaveola Oberthür, 1904; Deilephila tithymali deserticola Staudinger, 1901

= Hyles tithymali =

Species of moth

Hyles tithymali, the Barbary spurge hawk-moth, is a species of moth in the family Sphingidae first described by Jean Baptiste Boisduval in 1834. Genomic analysis places the entire species as a subspecies of Hyles euphorbiae. It is found in North Africa, the Canary Islands, Madeira, some islands in the Mediterranean Sea and in the mountains in Yemen.

The length of the forewings is 45–85 mm. The larvae feed on Euphorbia.

It is thought that Hyles tithymali had a much larger range in Europe, but has been pushed further south after the cooling c. 3600 years ago. Its place has been taken over by strains of Hyles euphorbiae which are more resistant to the cold. Because of this, many isolated populations exist today, many of which have developed into distinct subspecies.

== Subspecies ==
The following subspecies are recognised:

- H. t. tithymali (Boisduval, 1834) (Tenerife, Gran Canaria, Lanzarote and Fuerteventura islands)
- H. t. mauretanica (Staudinger, 1871) (North Africa)
- H. t. deserticola (Staudinger, 1901) (North Africa)
- H. t. gecki (de Freina, 1991) (Madeira island)
- H. t. phaelipae Gil-T. & Gil-Uceda, 2007 (El Hierro and La Palma islands)
- H. t. himyarensis Meerman, 1988 (Yemen)
- H. t. cretica (Eitschberger, Danner & Surholt, 1998) (Creta island)
- H. t. gallaeci Gil-T., Requejo & Estévez, 2011 (north-western Iberian Peninsula, Galicia Region, Spain)

- The taxon sammuti [=H. t. sammuti (Eitschberger, Danner & Surholt, 1998)] according to molecular studies is a hybrid from H. euphorbiae × H. tithymali.

- Hyles tithymali cretica is regarded, according to authors, as a full species or as a hybrid from H. euphorbiae × H. tithymali.

- The taxonomic final status of the taxon gallaeci Gil-T., Requejo & Estévez, 2011 (larvae very similar to other taxa of the tithymali group) is awaiting a study molecular (not only of its mitochondrial DNA, but also of its nuclear DNA).

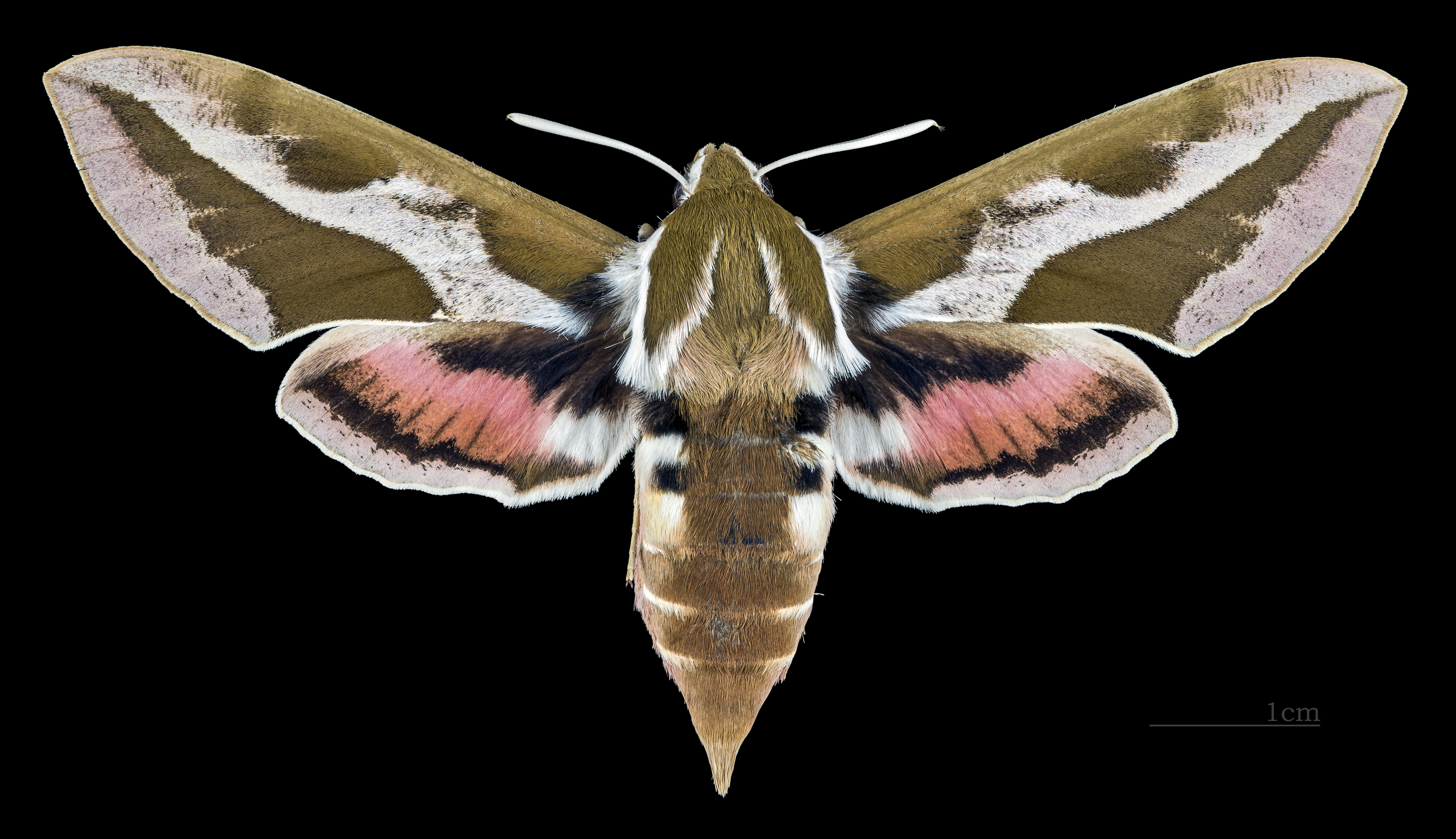
H. t. mauretanica - dorsal side

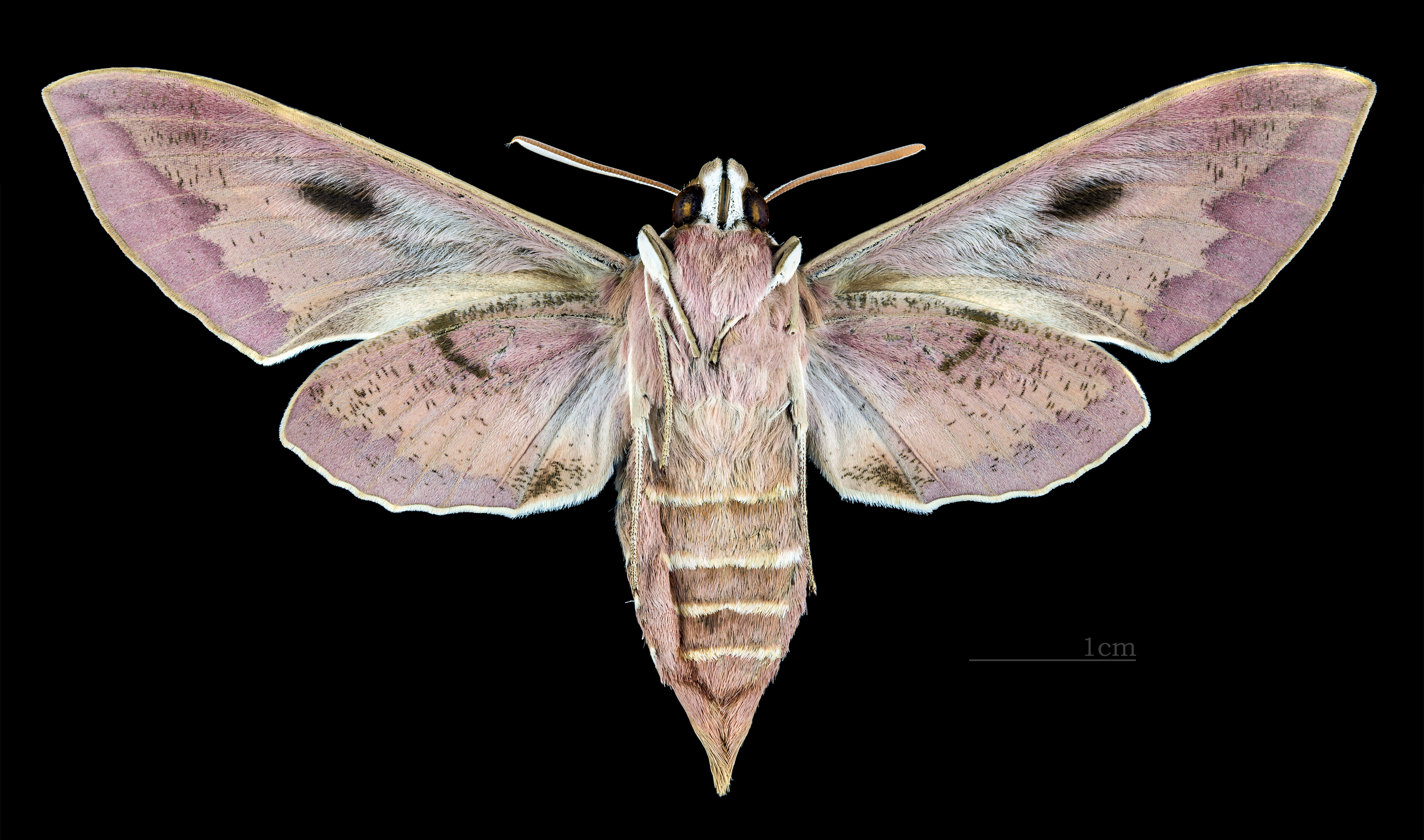
H. t. mauretanica - ventral side

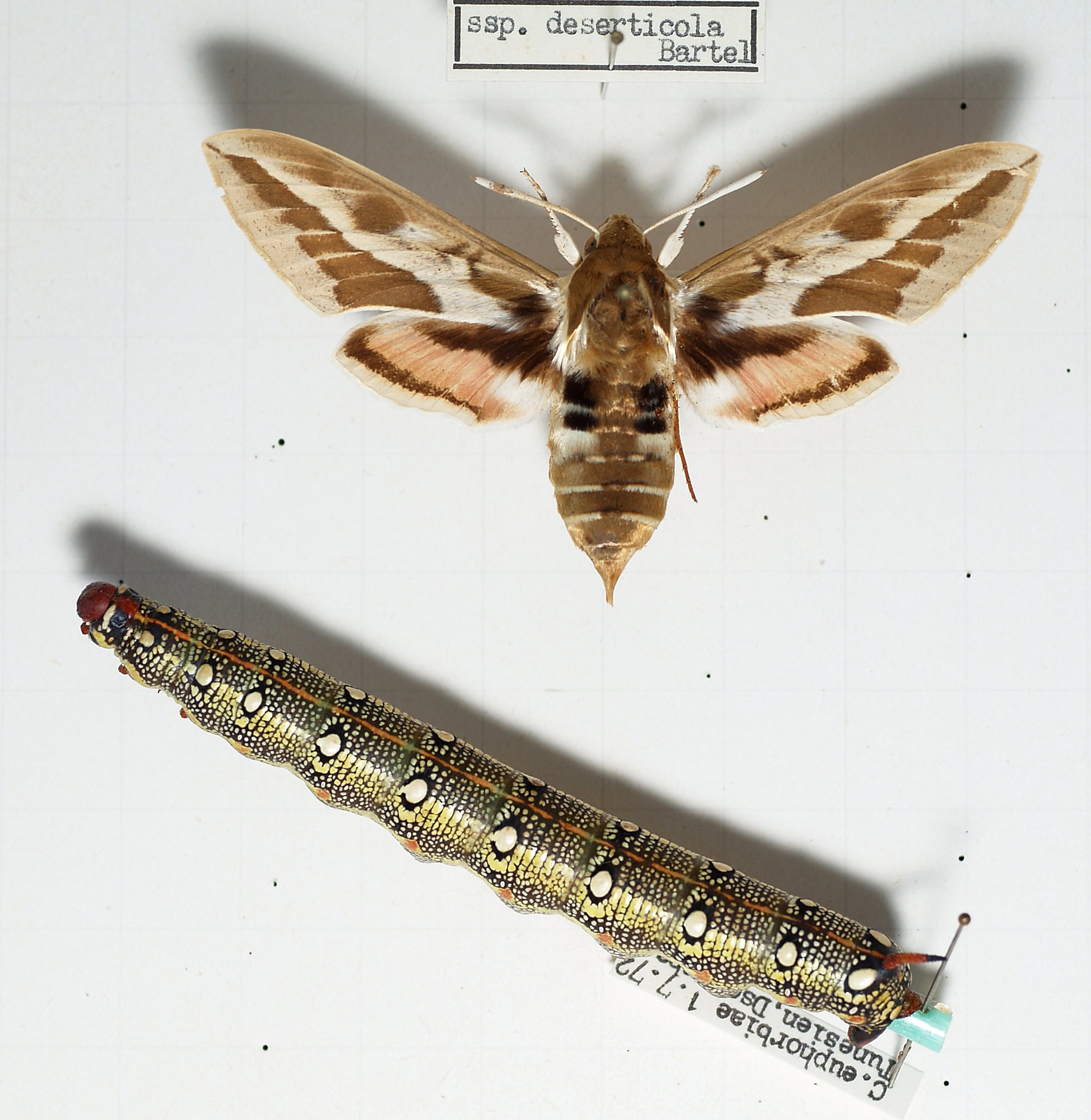
H. t. deserticola

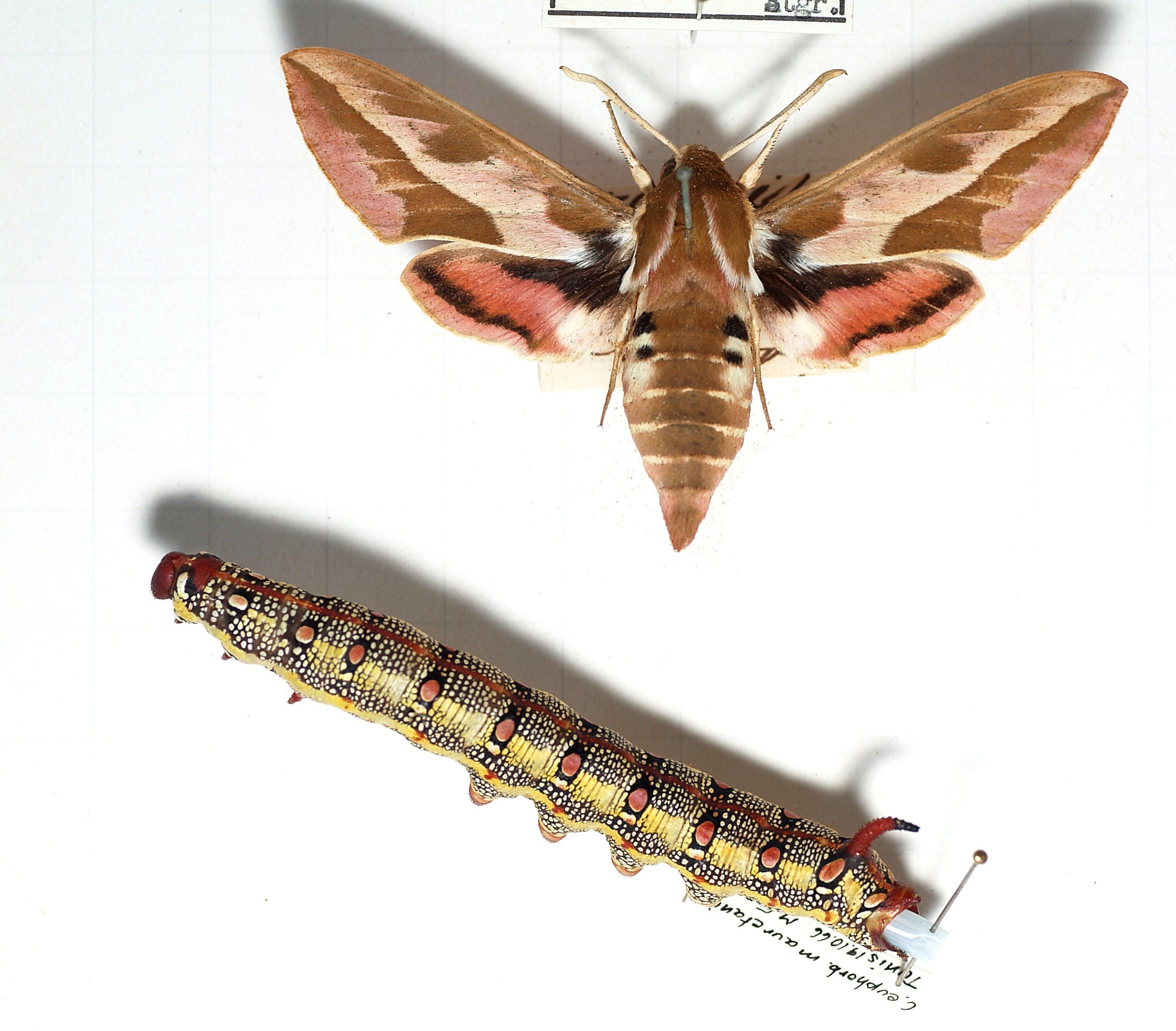
H. t. mauretanica
