= Ajuy =

Ajuy may refer to the following places:

- Ajuy, Iloilo, municipality in the Philippines
- Ajuy, Pájara, village in the Canary Islands, Spain
