= Cofete =

Village in the Canary Islands

Coordinates: 28°07′N 14°23′W

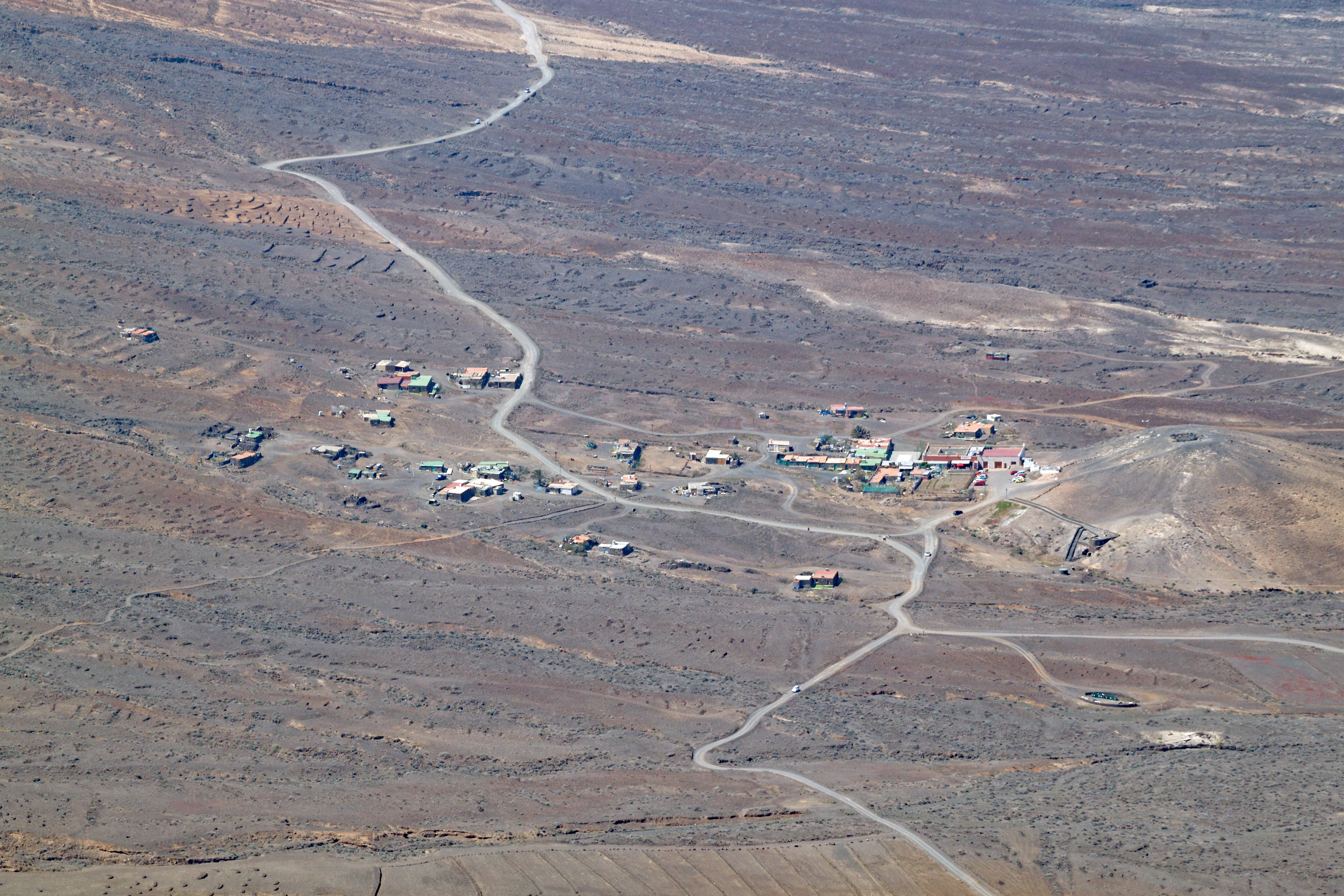
View from Pico de la Zarza

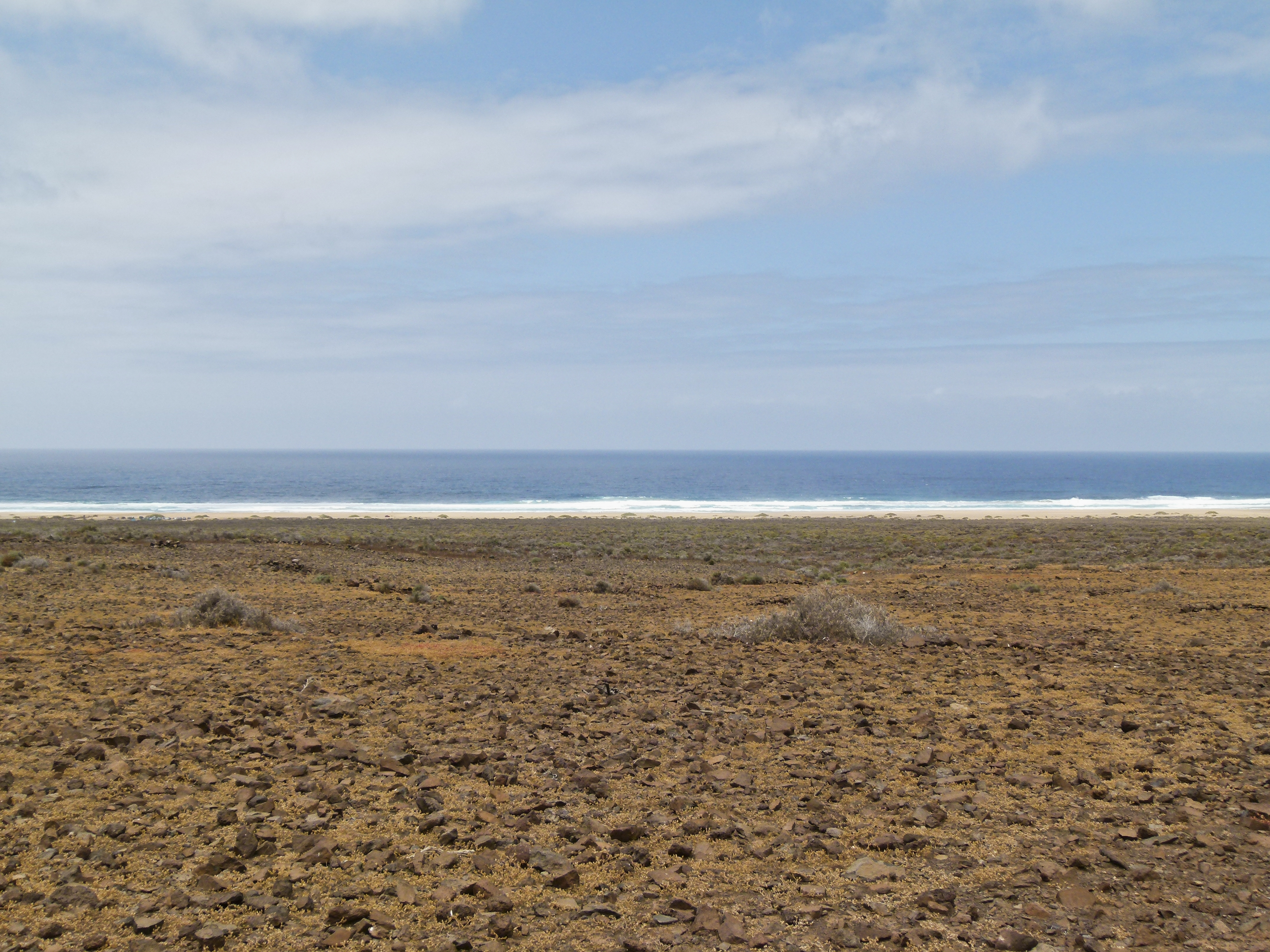
Playa de Cofete

Cofete is a small village in the western part of the Jandía peninsula in Fuerteventura, Canary Islands. It is part of the municipality Pájara. It is situated in a nature reserve (Parque Natural de Jandía). The Villa Winter is situated on a mountain slope near Cofete.

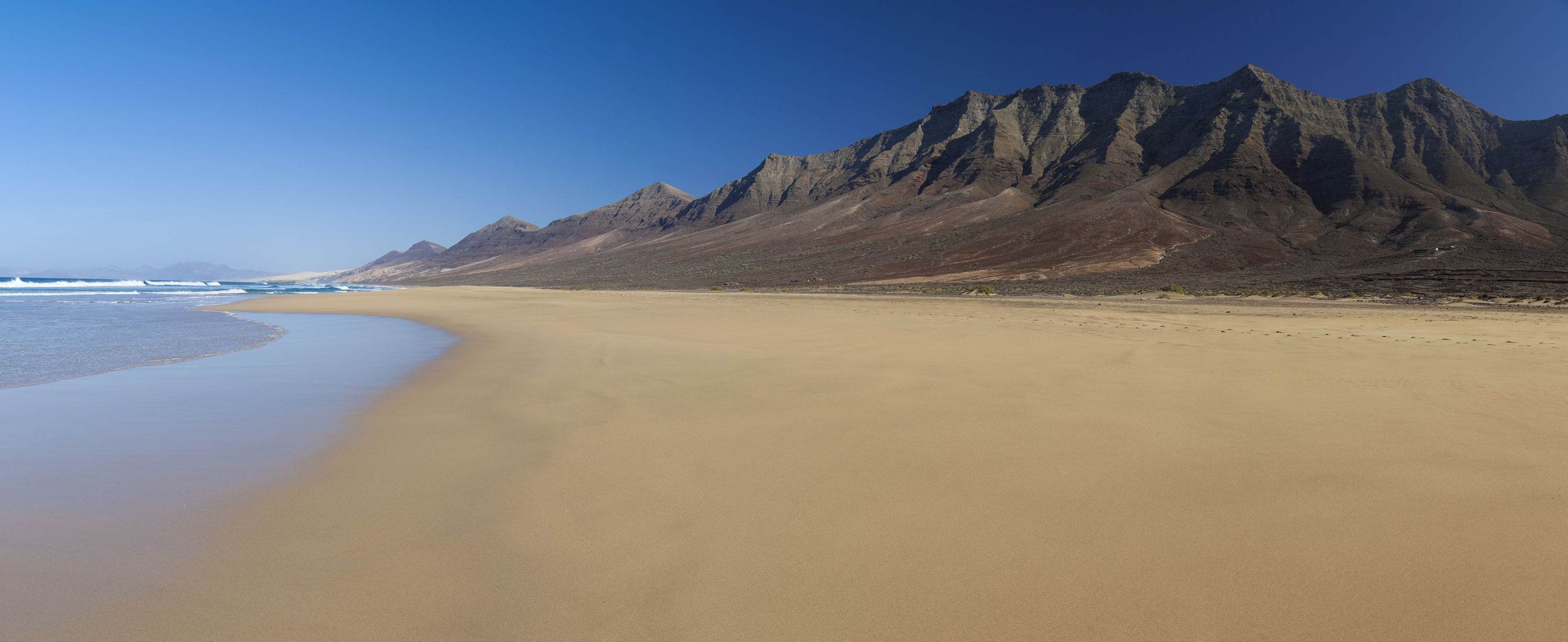
Fuerteventura, Canary Islands, wide and empty Cofete beach on Jandia Peninsula, panorama

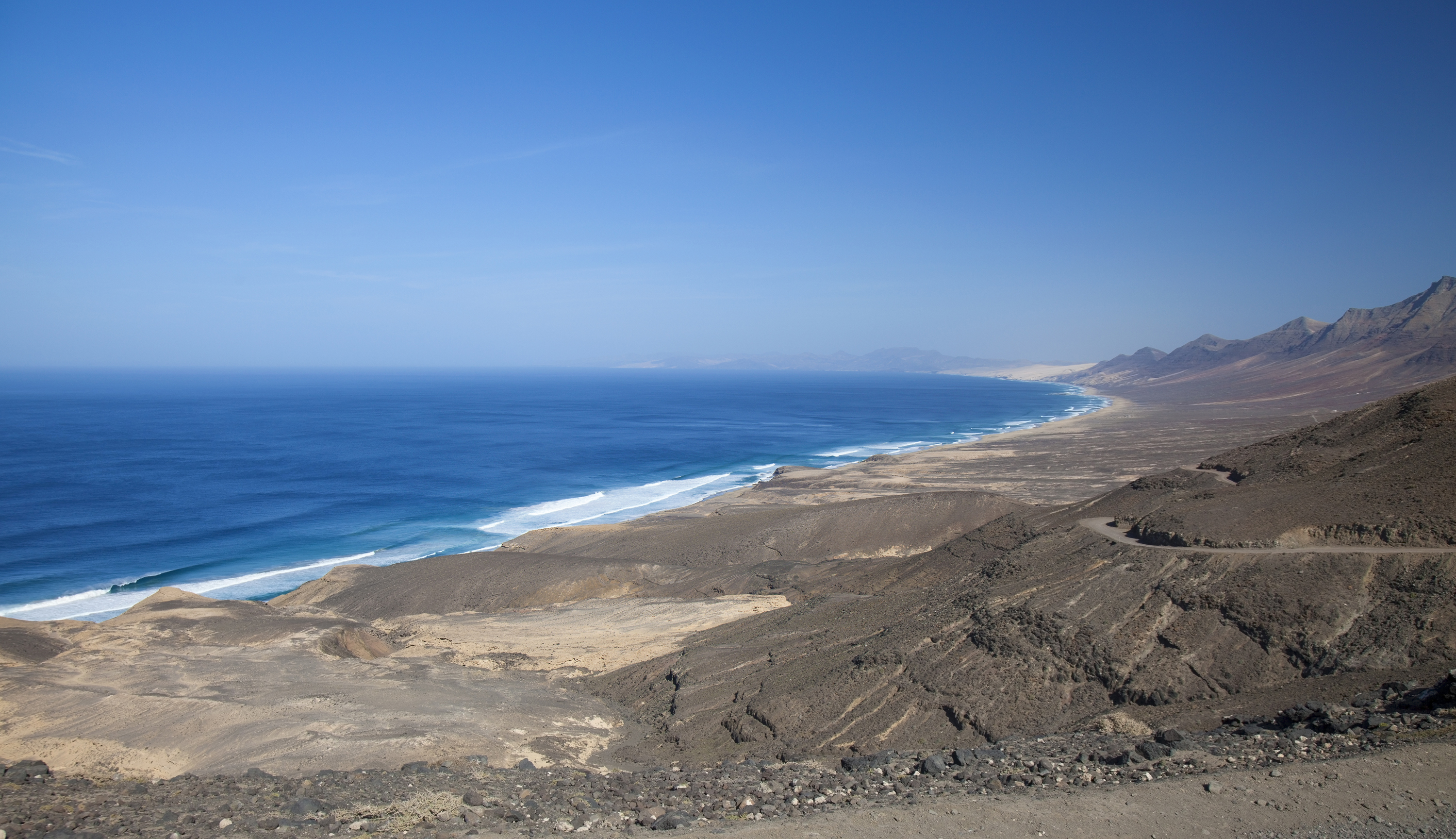
Fuerteventura, Canary Islands, view towards wide Cofete beach, Playa del Cofete and Playa de Barlovento from the road pass
