= Language contact =

Interaction between different languages

Language contact occurs when speakers of two or more languages or linguistic varieties interact with and influence each other. The study of language contact is called contact linguistics. Language contact can occur at language borders, between adstratum languages, or as the result of migration, with an intrusive language acting as either a superstratum or a substratum.

When speakers of different languages interact closely, it is typical for their languages to influence each other. Intensive language contact may result in language convergence or relexification. In some cases a new contact language may be created as a result of the influence, such as a pidgin, creole, or mixed language. In many other cases, contact between speakers occurs with smaller-scale lasting effects on the language; these may include the borrowing of loanwords, calques, or other types of linguistic material.

Multilingualism has been common throughout much of human history, and today most people in the world are multilingual. Multilingual speakers may engage in code-switching, the use of multiple languages in a single conversation.

Methods from sociolinguistics (the study of language use in society), from corpus linguistics and from formal linguistics are used in the study of language contact.

== Borrowing ==
=== Borrowing of vocabulary items ===
The most common way that languages influence each other is the exchange of words. Much is made about the contemporary borrowing of English words into other languages, but this phenomenon is not new, and it is not very large by historical standards. The large-scale importation of words from Latin, French and other languages into English in the 16th and the 17th centuries was more significant.

Some languages have borrowed so much that they have become scarcely recognisable. Armenian borrowed so many words from Iranian languages, for example, that it was at first considered a divergent branch of the Indo-Iranian languages and was not recognised as an independent branch of the Indo-European languages for many decades.

=== Borrowing of other language features ===
The influence can go deeper, extending to the exchange of even basic characteristics of a language such as morphology and grammar.

Newar, for example, spoken in Nepal, is a Sino-Tibetan language distantly related to Chinese but has had so many centuries of contact with neighbouring Indo-Iranian languages that it has developed noun inflection, a trait that is typical of the Indo-European family but rare in Sino-Tibetan. Newar has also absorbed grammatical features like verb tenses.

Also, Romanian was influenced by the Slavic languages that were spoken by neighbouring tribes in the centuries after the fall of the Roman Empire not only in vocabulary but also phonology. English has a few phrases, adapted from French, in which the adjective follows the noun: court-martial, attorney-general, Lake Superior.

== Direction of influence ==
=== Linguistic hegemony ===
A language's influence widens as its speakers grow in power. Chinese, Greek, Latin, Portuguese, French, Spanish, Arabic, Persian, Sanskrit, Russian, German and English have each seen periods of widespread importance and have had varying degrees of influence on the native languages spoken in the areas over which they have held sway.

Especially since the 1990s, the Internet, along with previous influences such as radio and television, telephone communication and printed materials, has expanded and changed the many ways in which languages can be influenced by each other and by technology.

=== Non-mutual influence ===
Change as a result of contact is often one-sided. Chinese, for instance, has had a profound effect on the development of Japanese, but Chinese remains relatively free of Japanese influence other than some modern terms that were reborrowed after they were coined in Japan and based on Chinese forms and using Chinese characters. In India, Hindi and other native languages have been influenced by English, and loanwords from English are part of everyday vocabulary.

=== Mutual influence ===
In some cases, language contact may lead to mutual exchange, but that may be confined to a particular geographic region. For example, in Switzerland, the local French has been influenced by German and vice versa. In Scotland, Scots has been heavily influenced by English, and many Scots terms have been adopted into the regional English dialect.

== Outcomes of language contact ==
=== Language shift ===
The result of the contact of two languages can be the replacement of one by the other. This is most common when one language has a higher social position (prestige). This sometimes leads to language endangerment or extinction.

=== Stratal influence ===
When language shift occurs, the language that is replaced (known as the substratum) can leave a profound impression on the replacing language (known as the superstratum) when people retain features of the substratum as they learn the new language and pass these features on to their children, which leads to the development of a new variety. For example, the Latin that came to replace local languages in present-day France during Ancient Rome times was influenced by Gaulish and Germanic. The distinct pronunciation of the Hiberno-English dialect, spoken in Ireland, comes partially from the influence of the substratum of Irish.

Outside the Indo-European family, Coptic, the last stage of ancient Egyptian, is a substratum of Egyptian Arabic.

=== Creation of new languages: creolization and mixed languages ===
Language contact can also lead to the development of new languages when people without a common language interact closely. Resulting from this contact a pidgin may develop, which may eventually become a full-fledged creole language through the process of creolization (though some linguists assert that a creole need not emerge from a pidgin). Prime examples of this are Aukan and Saramaccan, spoken in Suriname, which have vocabulary mainly from Portuguese, English and Dutch.

A much rarer but still observed process, according to some linguists, is the formation of mixed languages. Whereas creoles are formed by communities lacking a common language, mixed languages are formed by communities fluent in both languages. They tend to inherit much more of the complexity (grammatical, phonological, etc.) of their parent languages, whereas creoles begin as simple languages and then develop in complexity more independently. It is sometimes explained as bilingual communities that no longer identify with the cultures of either of the languages they speak, and seek to develop their own language as an expression of their own cultural uniqueness.

=== Dialectal and sub-cultural change ===
Some forms of language contact affect only a particular segment of a speech community. Consequently, change may be manifested only in particular dialects, jargons, or registers. South African English, for example, has been significantly affected by Afrikaans in terms of lexis and pronunciation, but the other dialects of English have remained almost totally unaffected by Afrikaans other than a few loanwords.

In some cases, a language develops an acrolect that contains elements of a more prestigious language. For example, in England during a large part of the Middle Ages, upper-class speech was dramatically influenced by Norman to the point that it often resembled a dialect.

The broader study of contact varieties within a society is called linguistic ecology.

== Sign languages ==
=== Contact between sign languages ===
Language contact can take place between two or more sign languages, and the expected contact phenomena occur: lexical borrowing, foreign "accent", interference, code switching, pidgins, creoles, and mixed systems.

=== Contact between sign languages and oral languages ===
Language contact is extremely common in most deaf communities, which are almost always located within a dominant oral language culture. However, between a sign language and an oral language, even if lexical borrowing and code switching also occur, the interface between the oral and signed modes produces unique phenomena: fingerspelling, fingerspelling/sign combination, initialisation, CODA talk, TDD conversation, mouthing and contact signing.

== See also ==
- Areal feature
- Calque
- Code-switching
- Creole language
- Diffusion
- Language island
- Language transfer
- Lexical gap
- Lingua franca
- Linguistic anthropology
- Loanword
- Metatypy
- Mixed language
- Nahuatl–Spanish contact
- Phono-semantic matching
- Pidgin
- Post-creole speech continuum
- Sprachbund
- Trading zones (metaphor) – Metaphor applied to collaborations in science
