= Villa Winter =

Architectural structure in the Canary Islands

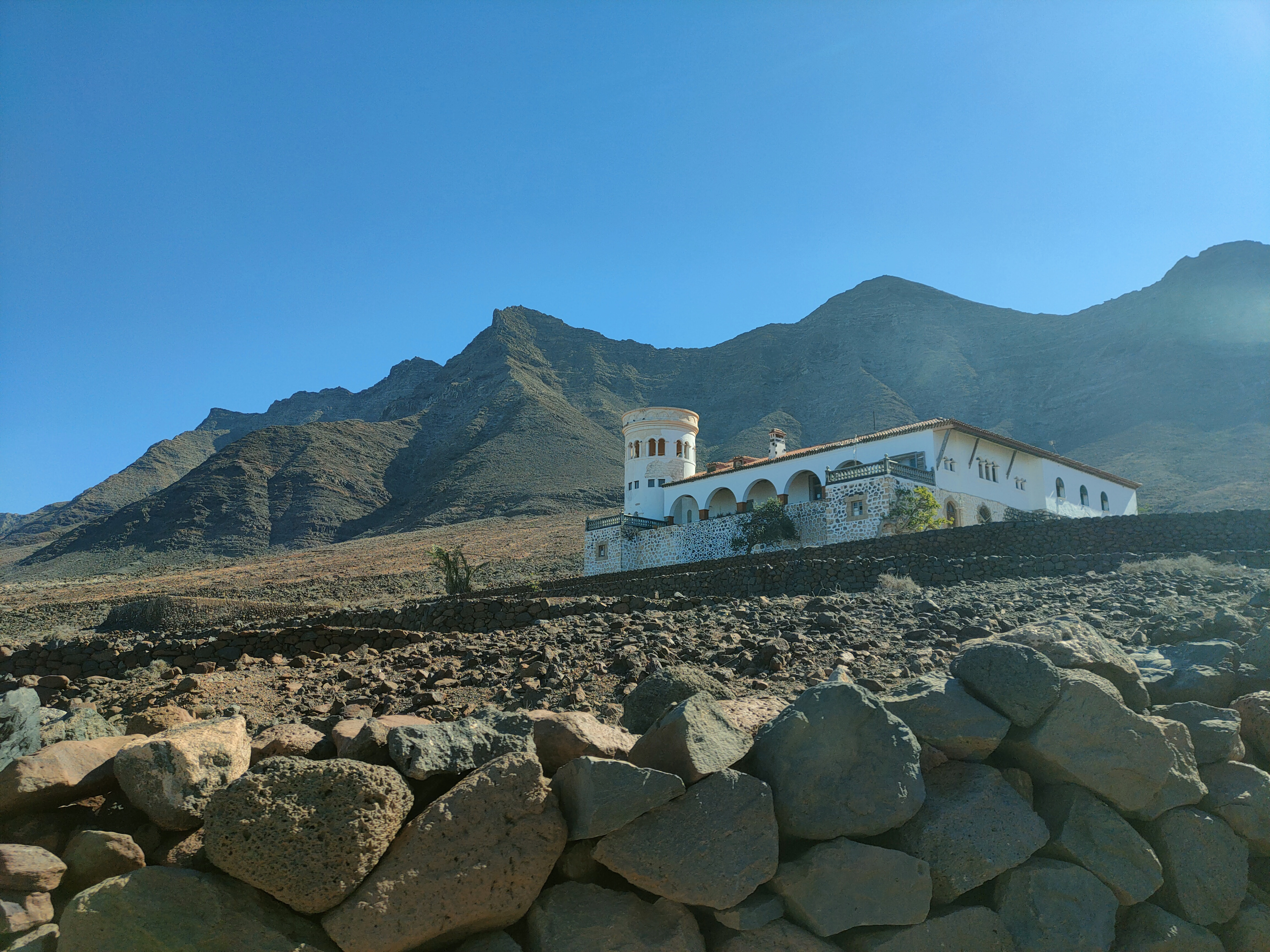
Villa Winter (2024)

Villa Winter (Spanish: Casa de los Winter) is a villa situated in a remote location of the southwestern part of the island of Fuerteventura, Canary Islands, near the village of Cofete on the Jandía peninsula. The villa was designed and built by Gustav Winter, a reclusive German engineer, born in 1893 in the Black Forest region of Germany. The villa has two floors and a basement, a balcony in the front, and a tower in the northeastern corner, with a 360-degree view. Villa Winter was reputedly built on land given to Mr Winter by Generalisimo Franco.

== History ==
Gustav Winter worked in Spain after 1915, and was active in different projects in Fuerteventura and Gran Canaria, including building an airstrip. The villa is built in a remote part of the island overlooking the Atlantic Ocean, with only a dirt track leading to it. According to local residents, the villa was built between 1946 and 1954, in the municipal registry of the Pajara town hall on the island of Fuerteventura, there is the documentation submitted in 1949 by the architect and the surveyor. Purported to have been built for farming, local residents claim variously that the Spanish Army built it, that forced labor from a nearby prison camp was used in its construction, and that the site was heavily guarded during construction.

The villa is the subject of several conspiracy theories, often involving Nazis. The main theory involves the fact that the villa had a tower with an electric lantern installed in its turret, similar to a lighthouse, and that it was used to signal German U-boats. The tower has a large fuse box installed on the wall. However, in an interview shortly before she died, Winter's widow said that the villa was built purely to exploit the agricultural potential of the area.

Villa Winter featured in a 2019 episode of Secret Nazi Bases, a TV documentary on UK channel Yesterday, also cablecast on the American Heroes Channel in the United States. The program showed tunnels and rooms in the basement under the house, some built with walls 1.4 metres (4 ft 7 in) thick, and with arched ceilings, said to be effective at resisting explosions. The current resident and caretaker, Pedro Fumero, who was interviewed in the documentary, claimed to have played in the basement as a child, and saw shackles there in a windowless room just wide enough for a person's arms to be affixed to opposite walls. He said that he had investigated 1.3 metres (4 ft 3 in) below the house, but was forbidden by local authorities to excavate what he suspected were hidden cavities. It was claimed that the remnants of an air strip, similar to the one built by Winter elsewhere on the island, could be seen from above in front of the house.

Pedro Fumero is the current resident of Villa Winter. He strives to renovate the building and investigate its history.

== Gallery ==
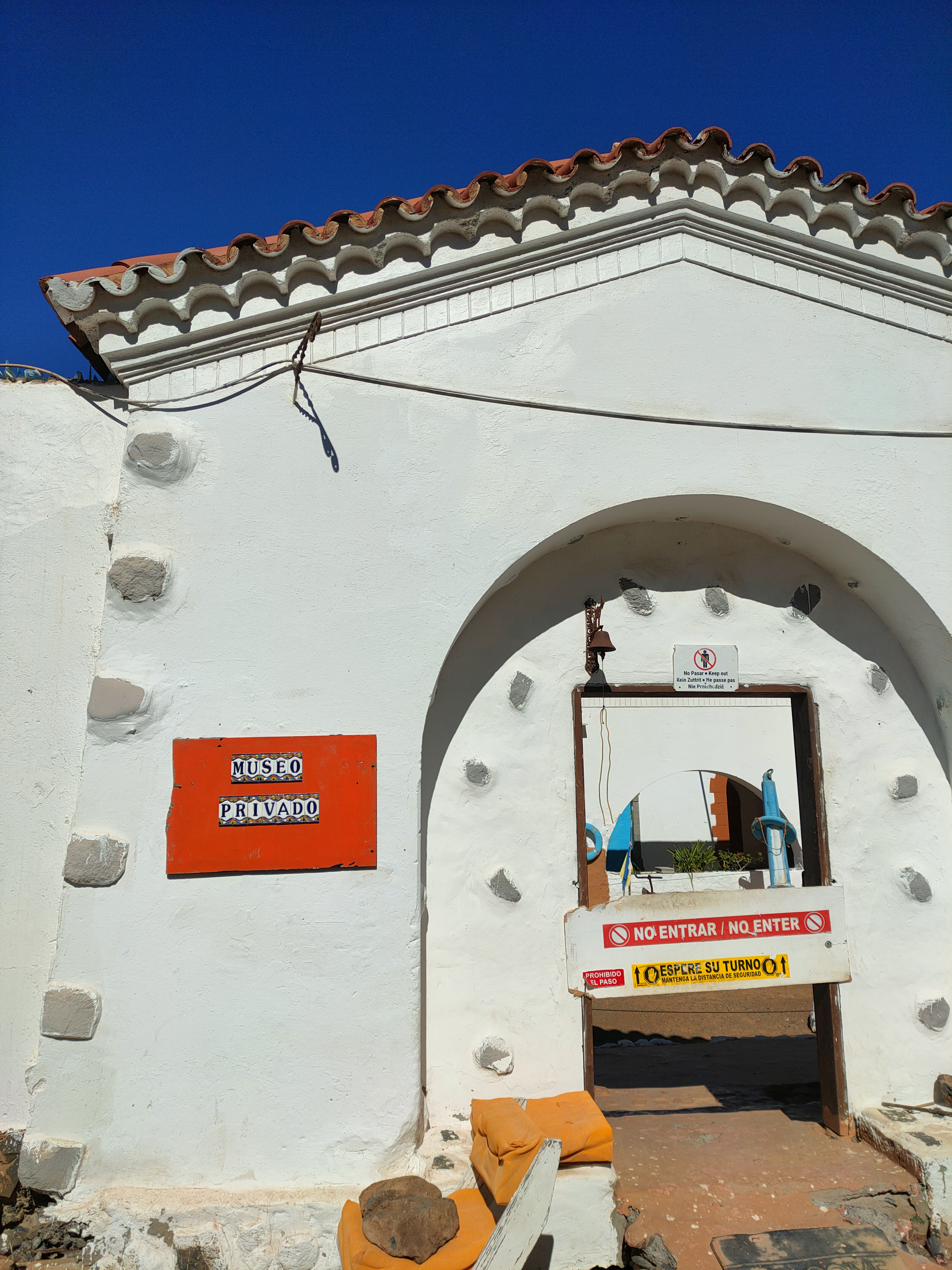
Front Entrance of Villa Winter (2024)

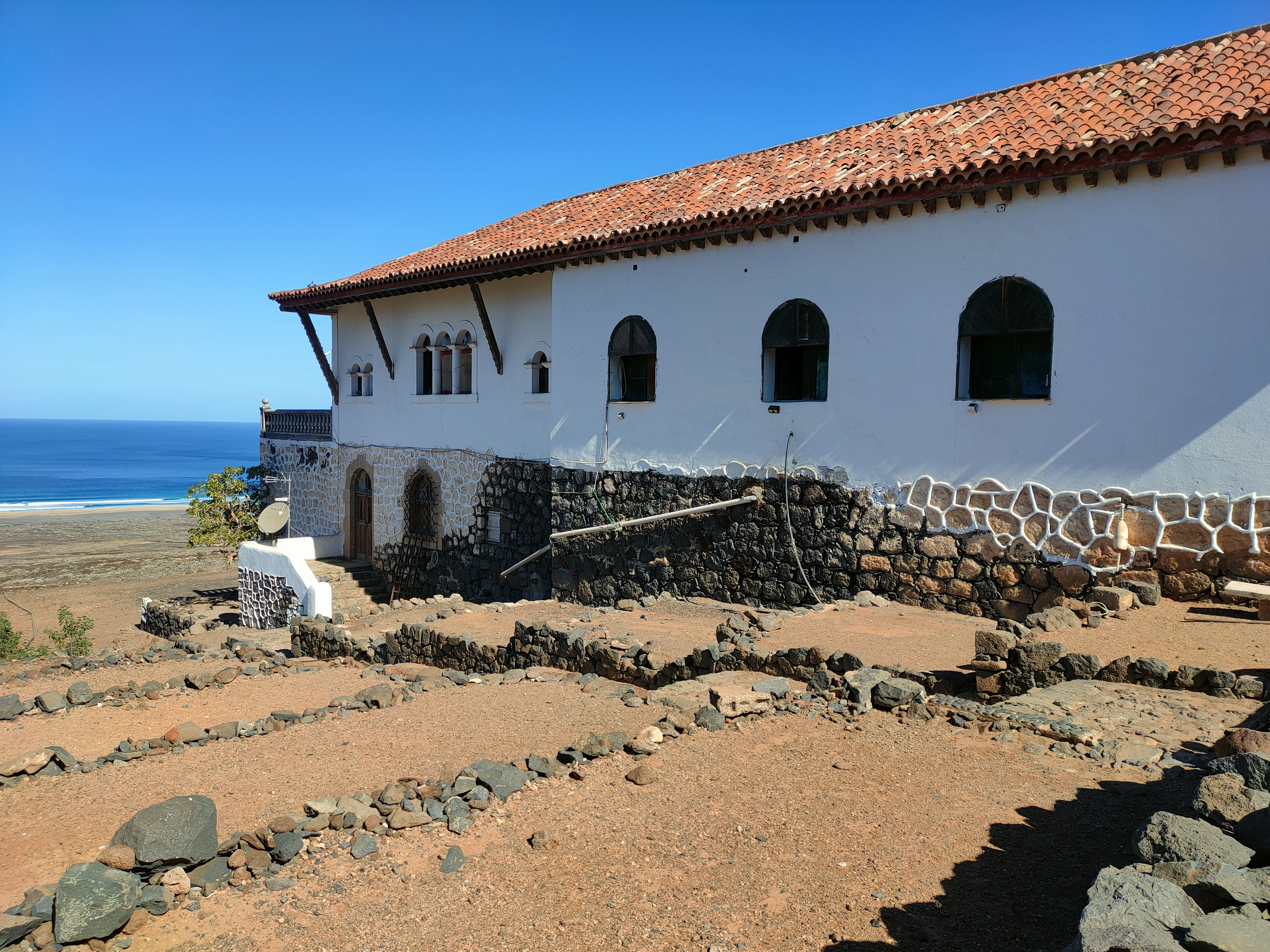
Side wall (2024)

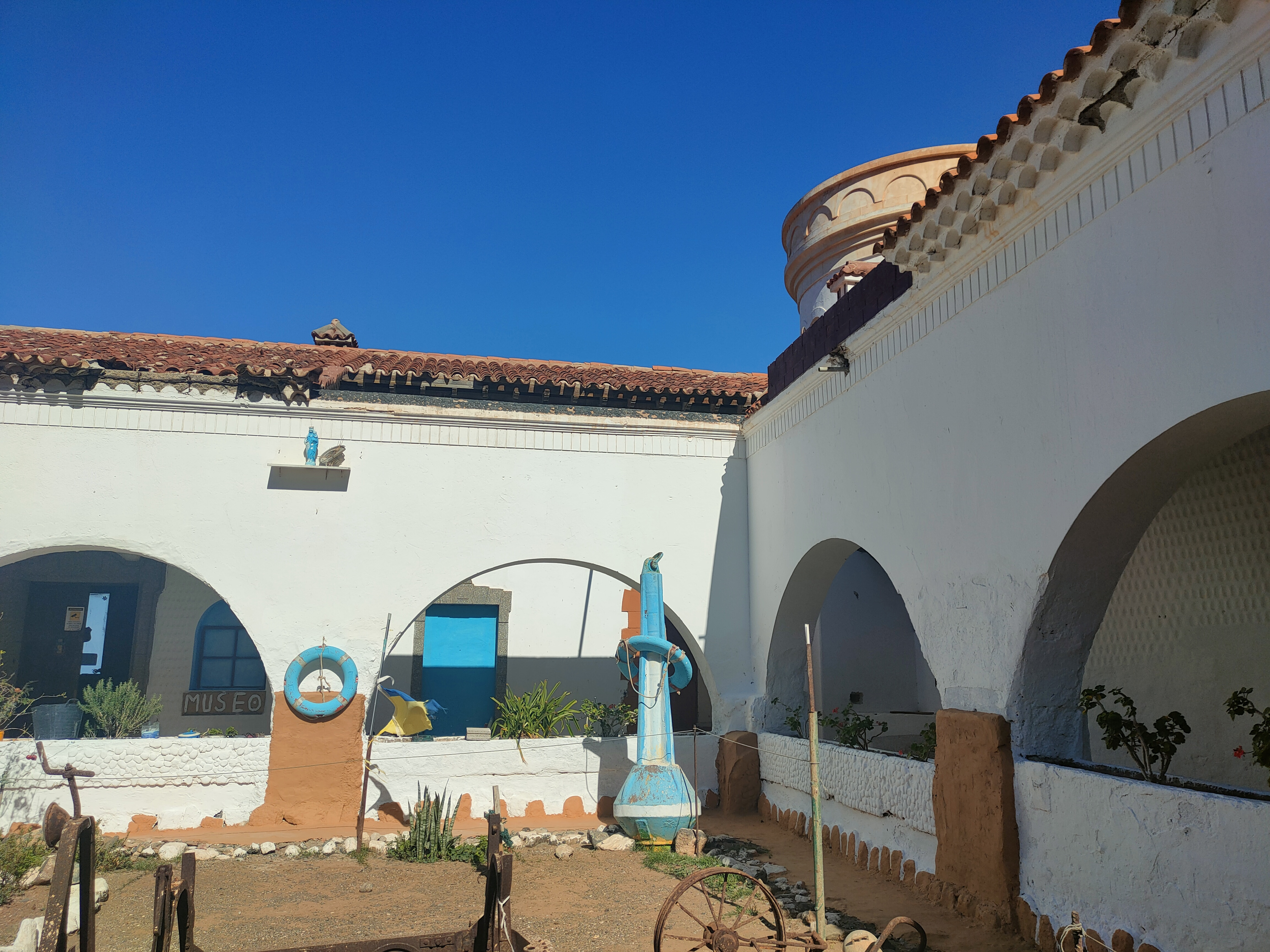
Courtyard (2024)

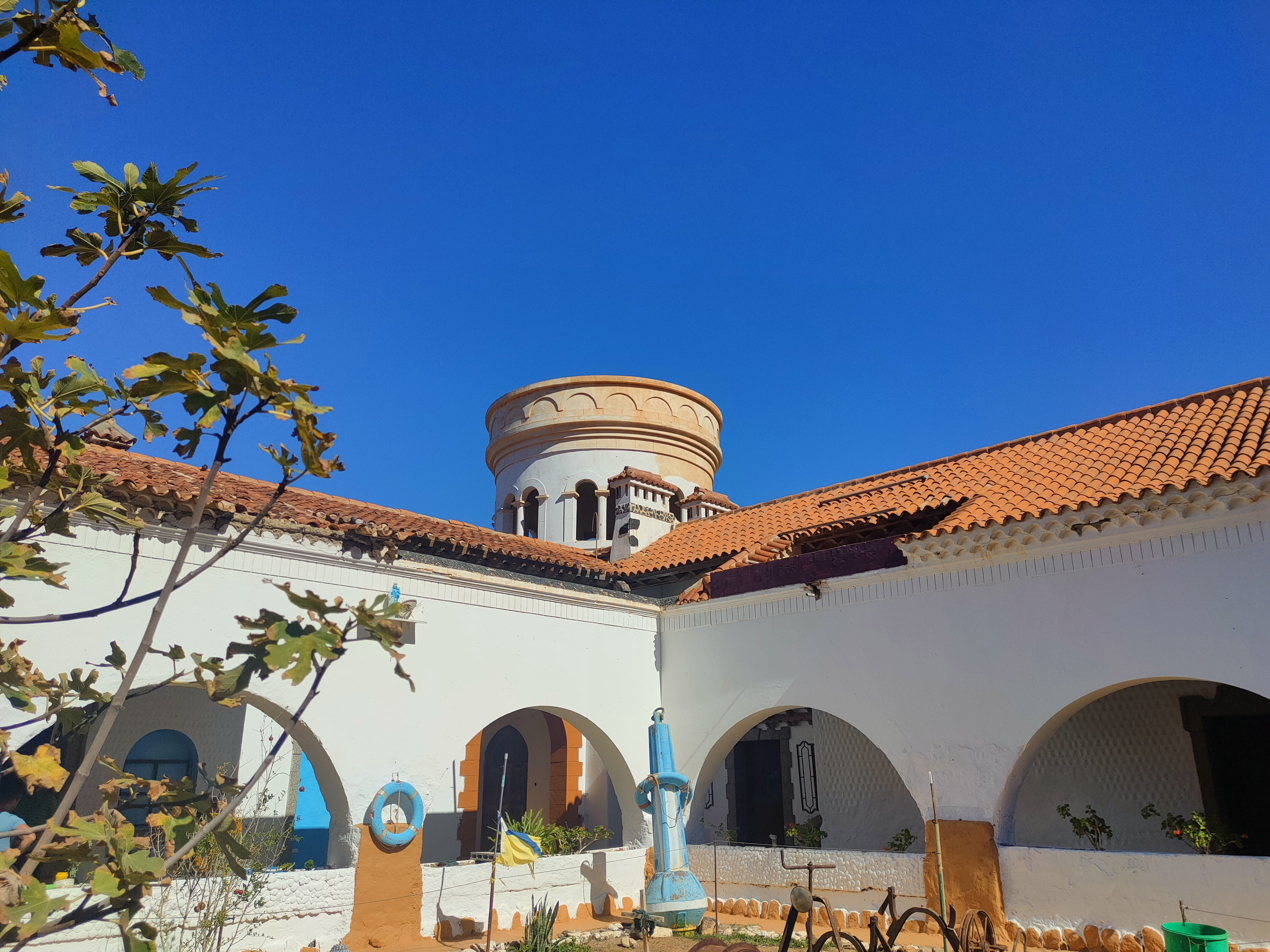
Courtyard (2024)

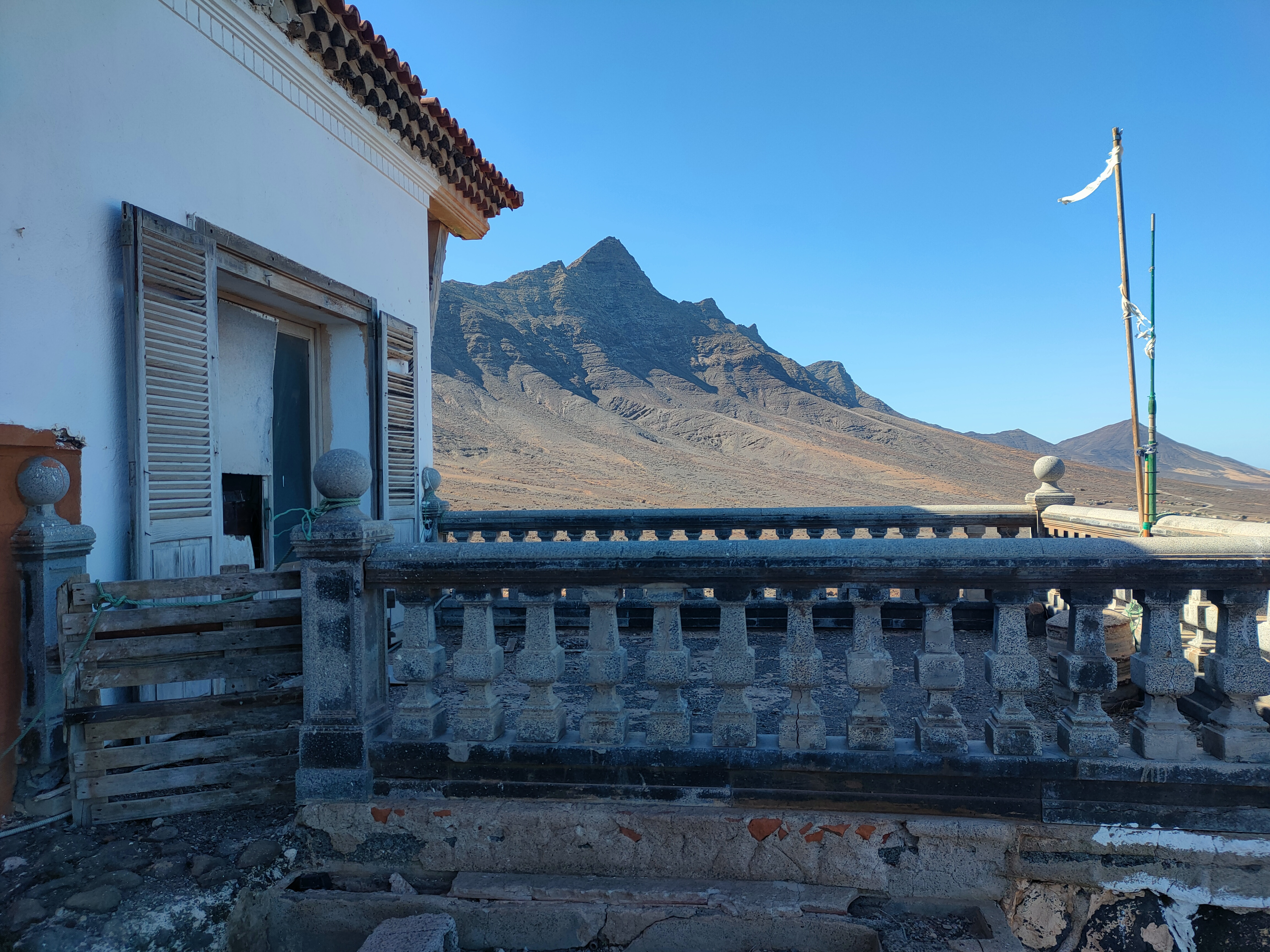
A terrace on the first Floor (2024)
