= Jandía =

Peninsula of Fuerteventura, Canary Islands

Coordinates: 28°05′N 14°22′W

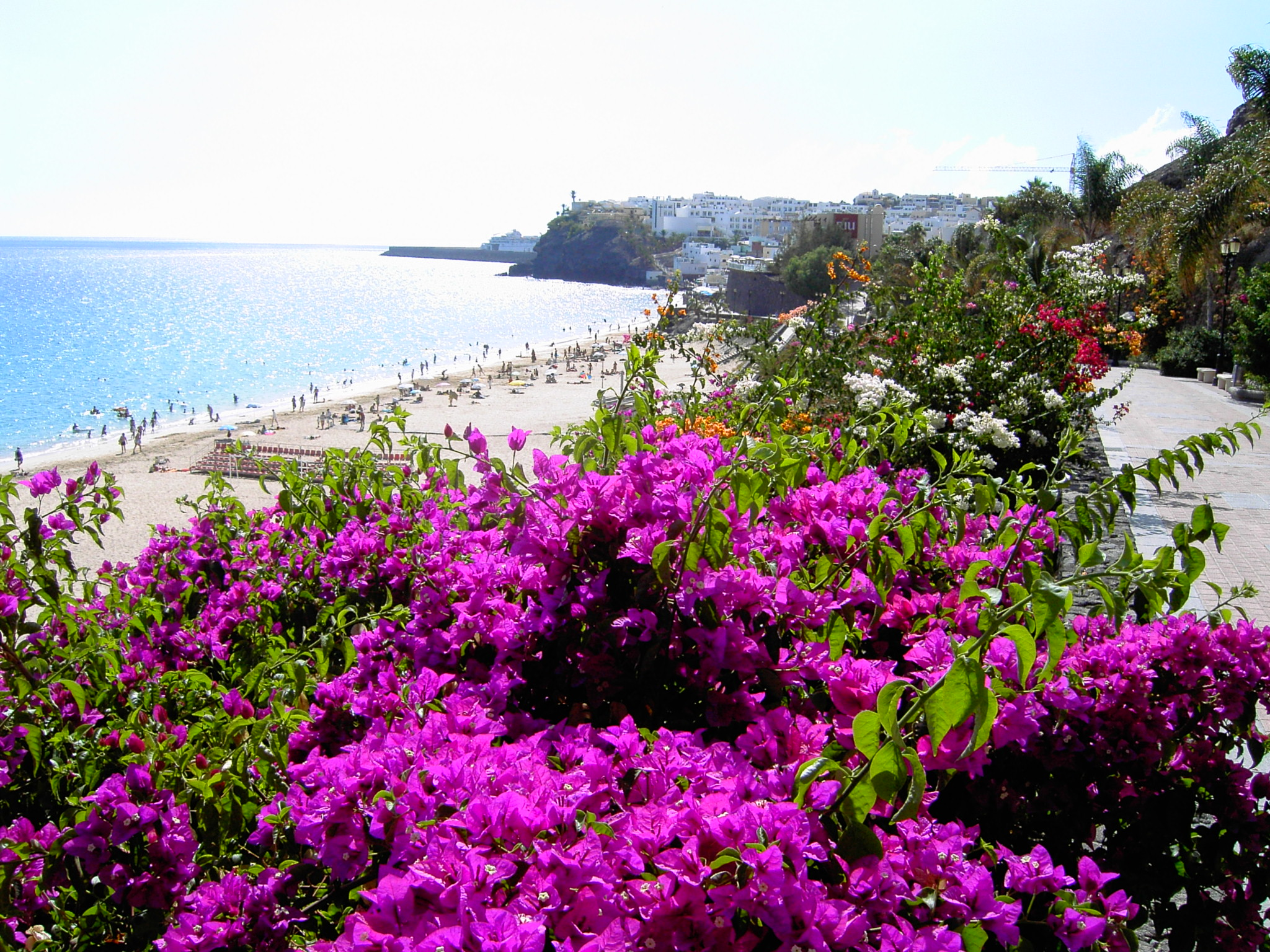
View of the Morro Jable beach

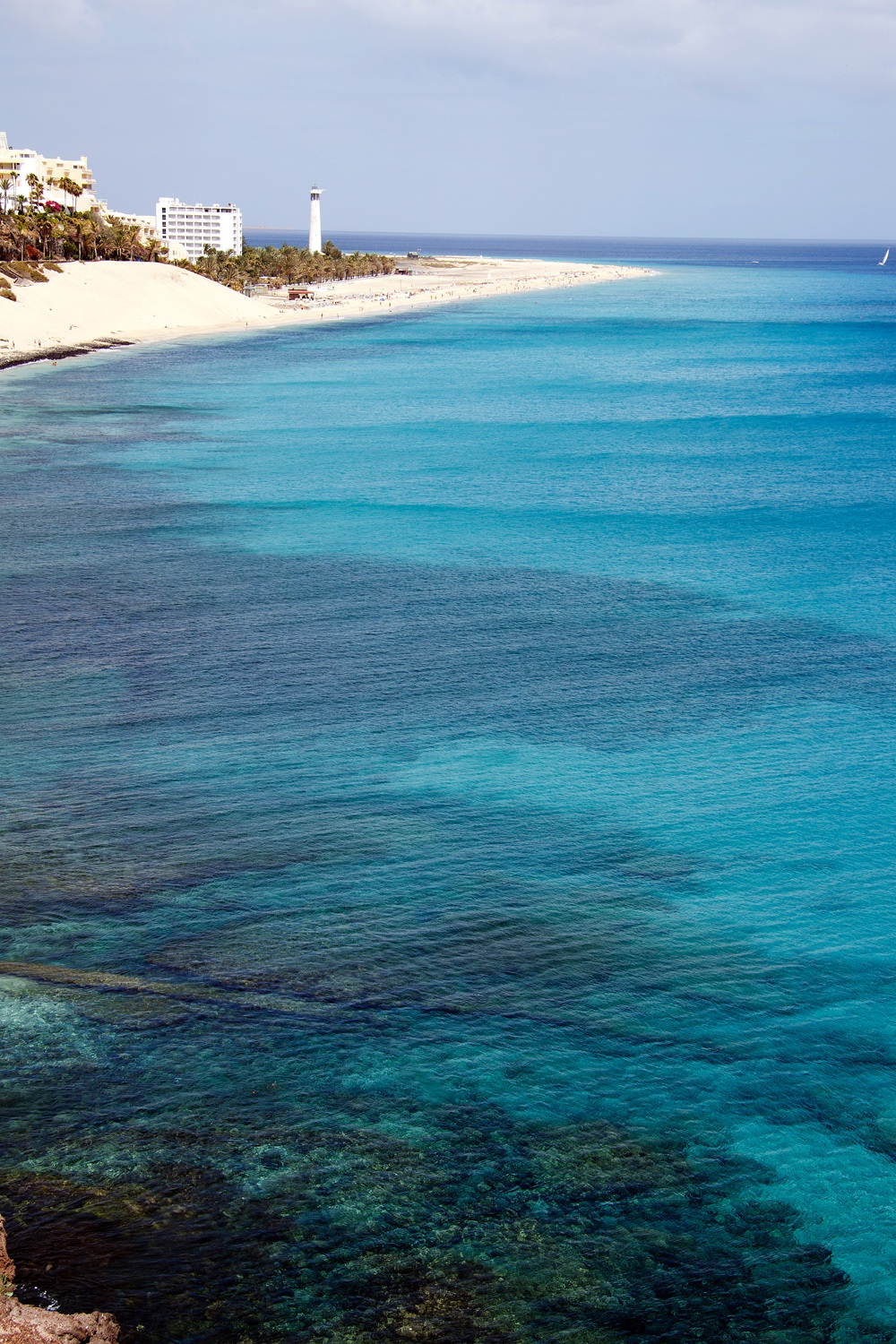
Jandía: View from Morro Jable to the lighthouse of Jandía Playa

Jandía is a peninsula in the southwestern part of the island of Fuerteventura in the Canary Islands. The peninsula is entirely in the municipality of Pájara. Within the peninsula is Fuerteventura's tallest mountain, Pico de Jandía or Pico de la Zarza, that rises to an elevation of 807 m. Jandía is connected with the rest of Fuerteventura through the isthmus Istmo de la Pared. Most of the peninsula has been a nature reserve (Parque Natural de Jandía) since 1987.

On the south and east coasts of Jandía there are the beach resorts Jandía Playa and Morro Jable. The western coast has some of the most beautiful and sandiest beaches in Fuerteventura and these are also used by surfers. The small fishing village of Cofete and the Villa Winter are situated on the north side of the peninsula.

== Panorama ==
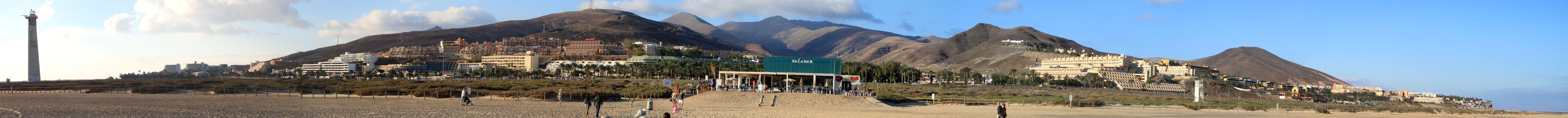
The coastline of Jandía Playa
