= Nahuatl–Spanish contact =

Nahuatl has been in intense contact with Spanish since the Spanish conquest of 1521. Since that time, there have been a large number of Spanish loanwords introduced to the language, loans which span from nouns and verbs to adjectives and particles. Syntactical constructions have also been borrowed into Nahuatl from Spanish, through which the latter language has exerted typological pressure on the form such that Nahuatl and Spanish are exhibiting syntactic and typological convergence. Today, hardly any Nahuatl monolinguals remain, and the language has undergone extreme shift to Spanish, such that some consider it be on the way to extinction.

The Nahuatl and Spanish languages have coexisted in stable contact for over 500 years in central Mexico. This long, well-documented period of contact provides some of the best linguistic evidence for contact-induced grammatical change. That is to say, Spanish seems to have exerted a profound influence on the Nahuatl language, but despite the extreme duration of their contact Nahuatl has only recently begun to show signs of language shift. This shift is progressing at a startling rate. Though Nahuatl still has over a million speakers, it is considered by some linguists to be endangered and on the way to extinction. As with regional languages the world over, Nahuatl finds itself being replaced by a ‘world’ language, Spanish, as other small linguistic communities have shifted to languages like English and Chinese. The world's loss in linguistic diversity can be tied to its changing economic and political conditions, as the model of industrial capitalism under a culturally homogenizing nation state spread throughout the world and culture becomes more and more global rather than regional. However, we do not always know exactly why some local or ‘traditional’ languages are clung to and preserved while others vanish much more quickly.

== Contact history ==
=== Spanish conquest ===
Contact in earnest between the two languages began along with the beginning of the Spanish conquest of Mexico in 1519. Prior to that, Nahuatl existed as the dominant language of much of central, southern, and western Mexico, the language of the dominant Aztec culture and Mexica ethnic group. Though the Spanish tried to eradicate much of Mexica culture after their defeat of the Mexica Aztec in their capital of Tenochtitlan in 1521, Aztec culture and the Nahuatl language were spread among a variety of ethnic groups in Mexico, some of whom, like the Tlaxcala, were instrumental allies of the Spanish in their defeat of the Aztec empire. Since a large part of the surviving indigenous population, whom the Spanish hoped to Christianize and assimilate, were part of the now fragmented Aztec culture and thus speakers of Nahuatl, the Spanish missionaries recognized that they would continue to need the help of their Nahuatl speaking indigenous allies, and allowed them some relative autonomy in exchange for their help in conquering and Christianizing the remainder of the territory, in parts of which indigenous populations remained hostile throughout the 16th century. In this way, friendly Nahuatl speaking communities were valuable in their role as intermediaries between the Spanish and other indigenous groups.

=== Growing marginalization and emerging shift ===
Though the Spanish issued many decrees throughout the centuries discouraging the uses of native tongues, such decrees were difficult to enforce, and often counter-productive to the goals of the missionary and military forces actually interacting with the indigenous populations. That is early Spanish Franciscan missionaries believed mutual comprehension between converter and convertee to be essential to a successful Christianization. Many such missionaries learned Nahuatl and developed a system of writing for the language with the Latin alphabet, enabling them to transcribe many works of classical Nahuatl poetry and mythology, preserving the older, pre-contact varieties of the language. Thanks to the efforts of these early missionaries, there are documented sources of the Classical Nahuatl language dating back to the 1540s, which have enabled a systematic investigation of the changes it has undergone over the centuries under the influence of Spanish. Learning Nahuatl also enabled missionaries to teach the Christian gospel to American Indians using evangelical materials prepared in the indigenous language and using indigenous concepts, a technique which certain sects, particularly the Jesuits, believed was often met with better results.

Thus, though Nahuatl usage was discouraged officially, its use was actually preserved and encouraged by the Spanish in religious, scholarly, and civil spheres into the late 18th century, until the Spanish monarchy began to take a more hard-line approach towards assimilating indigenous populations into the state. By the time of the 1895 census, there were still 659,865 Mexican citizens who reported themselves to be monolingual Nahuatl speakers, which group represented 32.1% of the total indigenous-speaking population, but over the next century the number of monolingual Nahuatl speakers would decline. By 1930 there were reportedly 355,295 monolingual speakers, and as of the 2000 census there remain only approximately 220,000 monolinguals among the 1.5 million Nahuatl speakers, the vast majority of whom being middle-aged or elderly. At this point, Spanish was well-integrated into most Mexicano communities, and language shift was rapidly occurring among the younger generations.

== Syntactic change ==
As there came to be greater and greater degrees of interaction between Indian and Hispanic communities and with it greater bilingualism and language contact, the Mexicano language changed typologically to converge with Spanish and ease the incorporation of Spanish material. Through the first few years of language contact, most Spanish influence of Nahuatl consisted in simple lexical borrowings of nouns related to the emergent material exchange between the two cultures. However, where the influence of Nahuatl on Mexican Spanish largely stopped at the level of basic lexical borrowings, Nahuatl continued on to borrow more grammatical words: verbs, adjectives, adverbs, prepositions, connective particles, and discourse markers. Incorporation of such borrowed materials into the native language made forced some grammatical alterations to accommodate structures that would not be possible within Classical Nahuatl. The net effect of such alterations was that “Nahuatl by 1700 or 1720 had become capable in principle of absorbing any Spanish word or construction. The rest has been done by continued, ever growing cultural pressures, bringing in more words and phrases as the two bodies of speakers became more intertwined and bilingualism increased.”

To be more specific, there has been convergence in word order, level of agglutination, and incorporation of Spanish grammatical particles and discourse markers in Nahuatl speech. For instance, whereas Nahuatl had an adjective-noun word order Mexicano follows Spanish in its noun-adjective word order. This may be due to the borrowing of phrases from Spanish incorporating the Spanish particle de, in phrases of the form NOUN + de + ADJ, e.g. aretes de oro meaning ‘gold earrings’. Furthermore, the incorporation of de in Nahuatl may have also influenced a parallel shift from modifier-head to head-modifier in possessive constructions. That is, Classical Nahuatl had a possessor-possessum/noun-genitive order, but infiltration of the Spanish particle de may have also driven the shift to possessum-possessor/genitive-noun order. Whereas previously possessive noun clauses in the Nahuatl were markedly introduced by an inflected possessum plus and adjunctor in and a possessor, or unmarkedly simply by an possessor and inflected possessum (that is, the in particle was inserted in front of the displaced element of a marked word order), Nahuatl speakers have analyzed the loan de as functioning in a parallel fashion to native in, and used it to create unmarked possessum/possessor constructions in the manner of Spanish, without genitive inflections.

So far this change has only spread to constructions with inanimate possessors, but it may extend further to compete with and displace Classical varieties and complete syntactic convergence. Parallel incorporation of Spanish prepositions in the previously postpositional language, along with Mexican Spanish discourse markers like pero, este, bueno, and pues have resulted in a modern Mexicano language that can sound strikingly Spanish in terms of its sentence frames, rhythm, and vocabulary. Finally, some agglutinative tendencies of Nahuatl have faded in contemporary dialects. For instance, in Nahuatl there was a tendency to incorporate nouns into verbs as sorts of adverbial modifiers which is losing productivity. One could tortilla-make for instance. Verbs generally were accompanied by a wide variety of objective, instrumental, tense, and aspect markers. One commonly would agglutinatively indicate directional purposivity, for instance, but such constructions are now more commonly made with a periphrastic Spanish calque of the form GO + (bare) INF (a la ir + INF). Such disincorporation of verbal modifiers into periphrastic expressions on analogy with Spanish forms indicates a shift towards a more analytic style characteristic of Hispanic speech.

== See also ==
- Aztec influence in Spain
