= Aztec influence in Spain =

Aztec influence in Spain can be seen in both the cuisine of Spain and in its architecture.

== Food ==
Guacamole, an avocado-based dip that was popular in Aztec cuisine as early as the 16th century, was brought back to Spain by the Conquistadors. Its reputation as an aphrodisiac derives from the words that combine to form the word ahuaca-molli ("guacamole" in the Aztec language): molli meant "something mashed or pureed into a sauce" and as well as meaning "avocado" ahuacatl meant "testicle".

== Architecture ==
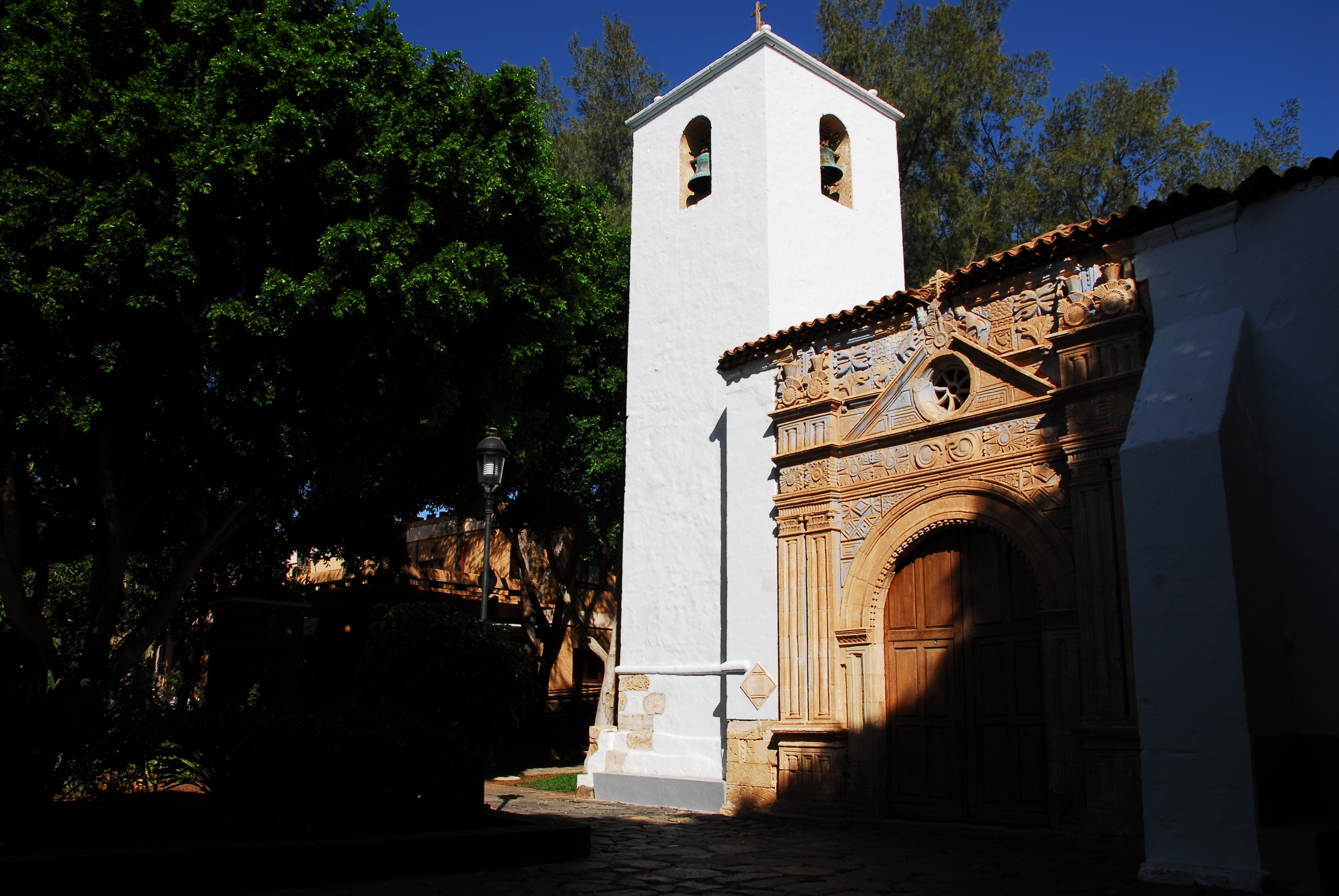
Church of Nuestra Señora de Regla, Pájara

The stone work of sun pattern, snakes, panther and birds above the main entrance to the church of Nuestra Señora de Regla, Pájara, Fuerteventura in the Canary Islands, is thought by some specialists to show Aztec influence.

== See also ==
- Columbian exchange
- Nahuatl–Spanish contact
