= Pájara =

- Municipality
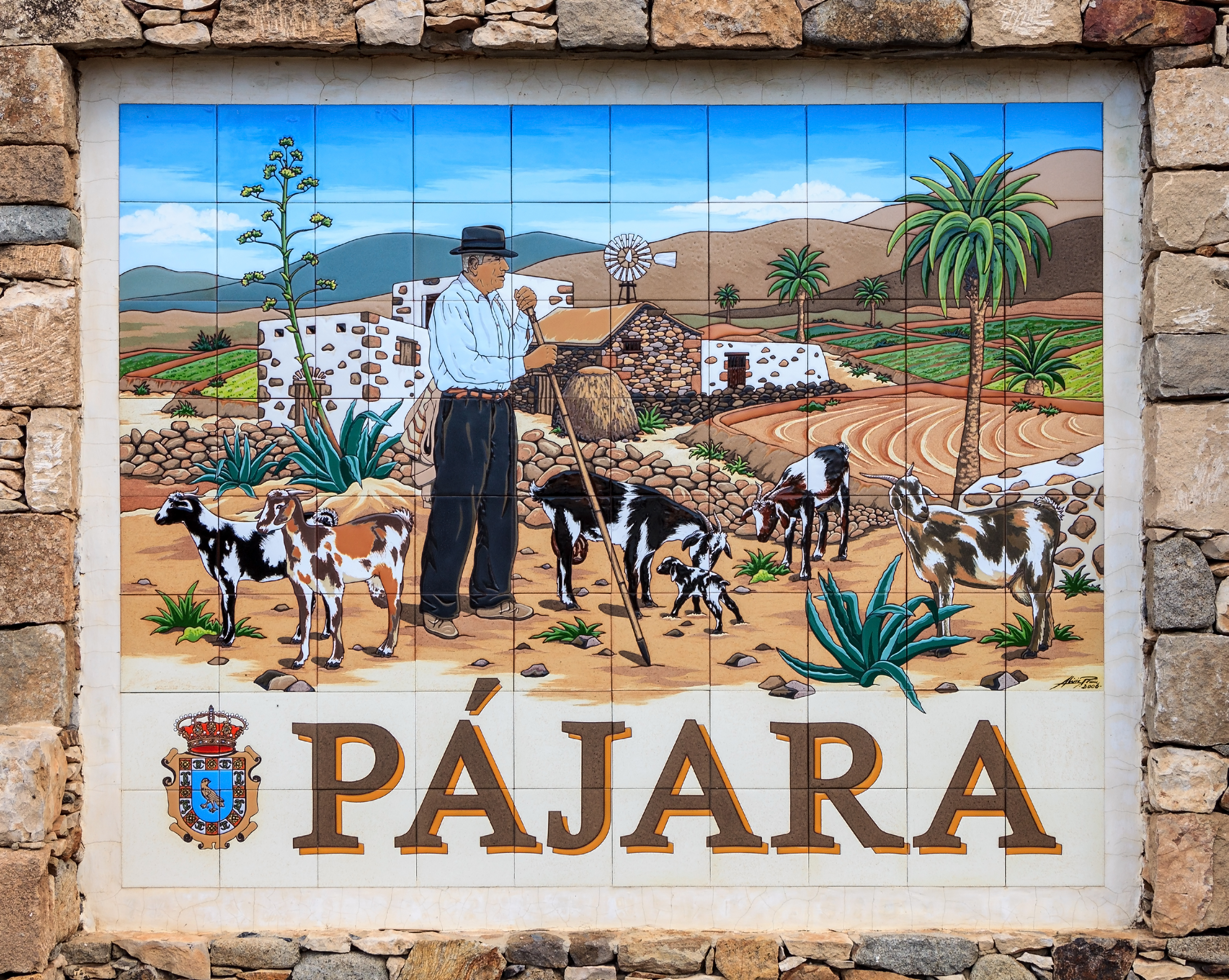

- Flag Coat of arms

- Municipal location in Fuerteventura

- Location in the province of Las Palmas Pájara (Canary Islands) Pájara (Spain, Canary Islands)
- Coordinates: 28°21′4″N 14°6′27″W
- Country: Spain
- Autonomous Community: Canary Islands
- Province: Las Palmas
- Island: Fuerteventura

Government
  - Mayor: Rafael Perdomo Betancor (PSC-PSOE)

Area
  - Total: 383.52 km^{2} (148.08 sq mi)
- Elevation (AMSL): 196 m (643 ft)

Population (2025-01-01)
  - Total: 21,570
  - Density: 56.24/km^{2} (145.7/sq mi)
- Time zone: UTC+0 (CET)
  - Summer (DST): UTC+1 (CEST (GMT +1))
- Postal code: 35628
- Area code: +34 (Spain) + 928 (Las Palmas)
- Website: www.pajara.es

Pájara is a municipality in the southwestern portion of the island of Fuerteventura in the Province of Las Palmas in the Canary Islands as well as the name of its largest town. Its population is 20,931 (2013), and the area is 383.52 km^{2}. Pájara is both the southernmost and the westernmost municipality on the island. Pájara is also the largest municipality on the island. The largest towns in the municipality of Pájara are Morro Jable and Costa Calma, both situated on the coast. The small port Ajuy is situated in the north of the municipality, near Betancuria. The Jandía peninsula is part of the municipality.

== Geology ==
Fuerteventura is the oldest island in the Canary Islands, dating back 20 million years to a volcanic eruption from the Canary hotspot. The majority of the island was created about 5 million years ago and since then has been eroded by wind and precipitation. On the seabed off the West coast of the island rests an enormous slab of bedrock 22 km (14 mi) long and 11 km (7 mi) wide, which appears to have slid off the island largely intact at some point in prehistory, similar to the predicted future collapse of Cumbre Vieja, a geological fault on another Canary Island, La Palma. The last volcanic activity in Fuerteventura occurred between 4,000 and 5,000 years ago.

The highest point in Fuerteventura is Pico de la Zarza (807 m) in the Southwestern part of the island. Geographical features include Istmo de la Pared, which is 5 km (3 mi) wide and is the narrowest part of Fuerteventura. The island is divided into two parts, the northern portion which is Maxorata and the southwestern part called the Jandía peninsula.

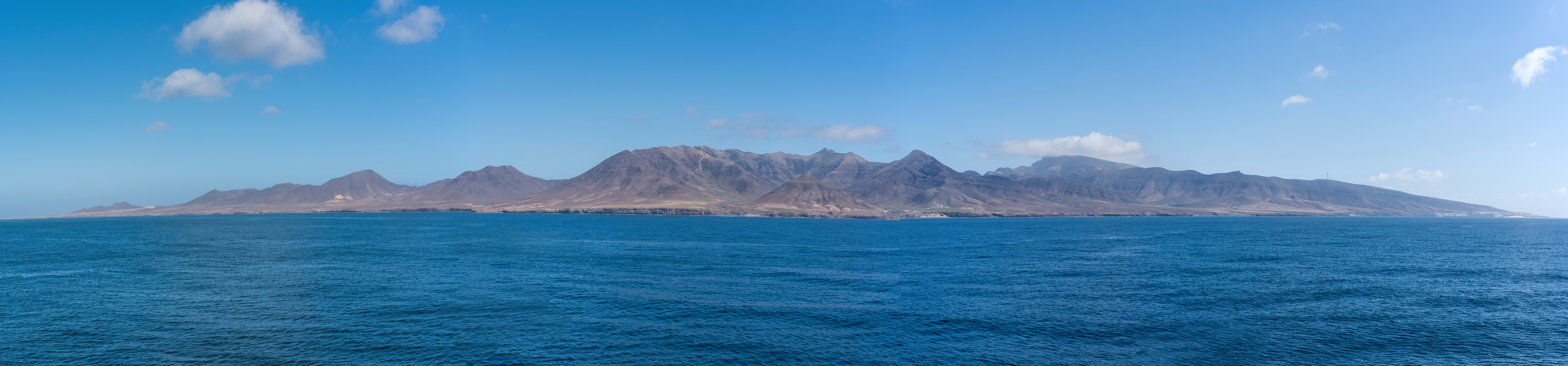
Pájara and the rest of Fuerteventura seen from the south.

=== Beaches ===
Fuerteventura was chosen among 500 European destinations by the Quality Coast International Certification Program of the European Coastal and Marine Union as one of the most attractive tourist destinations for visitors interested in cultural heritage, environment and sustainability.

== The church of Nuestra Señora de Regla in Pájara ==
The church of Nuestra Señora de Regla in Pájara town has interesting sculptures of sun pattern, snakes, panther and birds above the main entrance. It is thought by some experts to show Aztec influence.

== See also ==
- List of municipalities in Las Palmas
