= Ajuy, Pájara =

Village on Fuerteventura, Canary Islands, Spain

Coordinates: 28°23′59″N 14°09′20″W

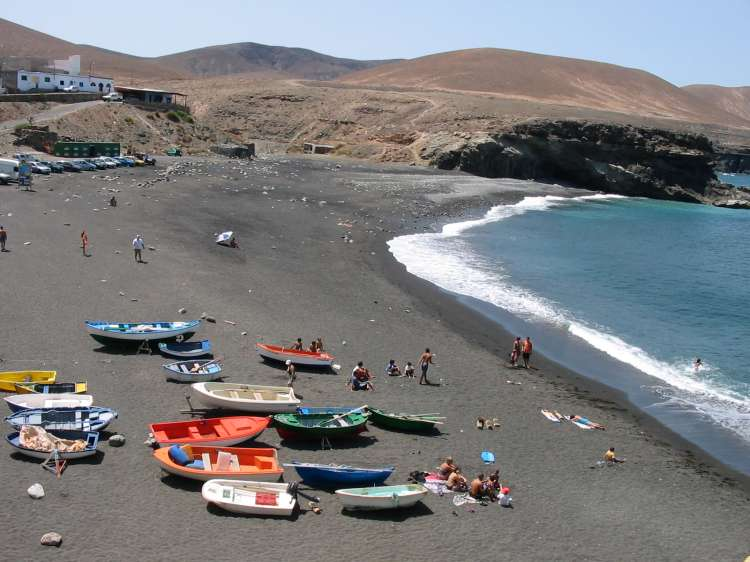
Beach at Ajuy

Ajuy is a small remote fishing village on the west coast of Fuerteventura in the Canary Islands. It is part of the municipality Pájara. Not far from Ajuy is where the Norman Jean de Béthencourt landed in 1402 to conquer the island for the Spanish crown.

Puerto de la Peña is a small settlement of Ajuy that used to serve as a port of the old island capital of Betancuria. The port was later raided by pirates. Caleta Negra (Spanish for "Black Bay") lies 2 km from Ajuy. Near this bay there is an old lime kiln. The limestone from Ajuy was considered particularly pure and was shipped from this place up until the second half of the 19th century.

Ajuy is today a popular tourist excursion destination to visit the deep and dramatic caves carved into the softer parts of the limestone cliffs by ocean winter storms.

== Demographics ==
Population of Ajuy
2000	2001	2002	2003	2004	2005	2006	2007	2008	2009	2013
118	119	125	129	129	126	123	111	106	101	85

== Gallery ==
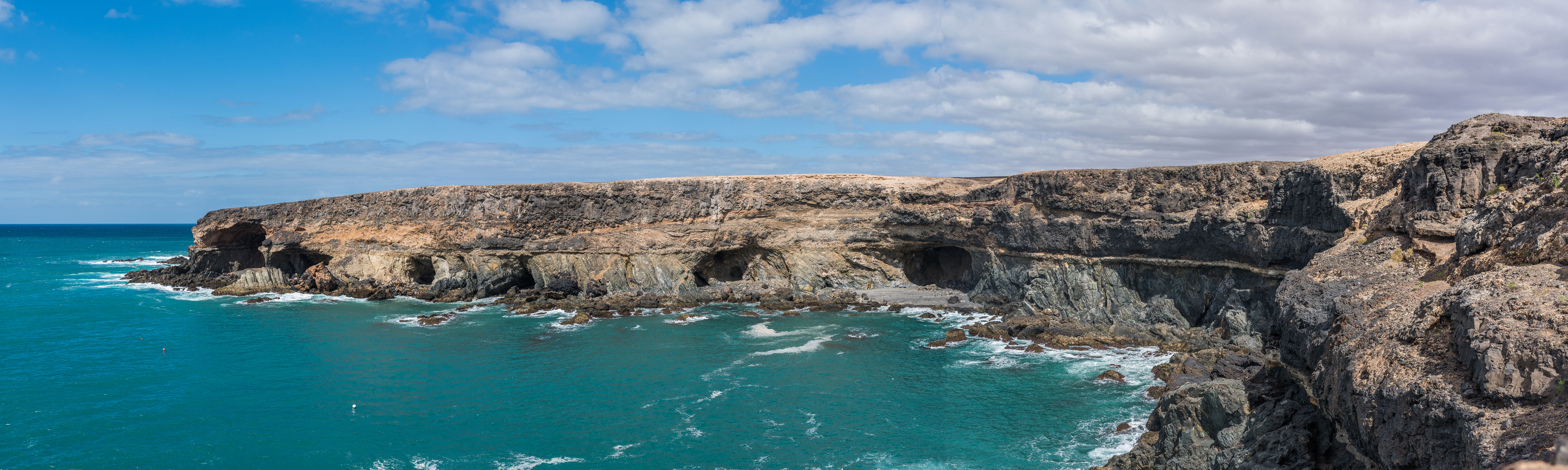
Cuevas de Ajuy 2016

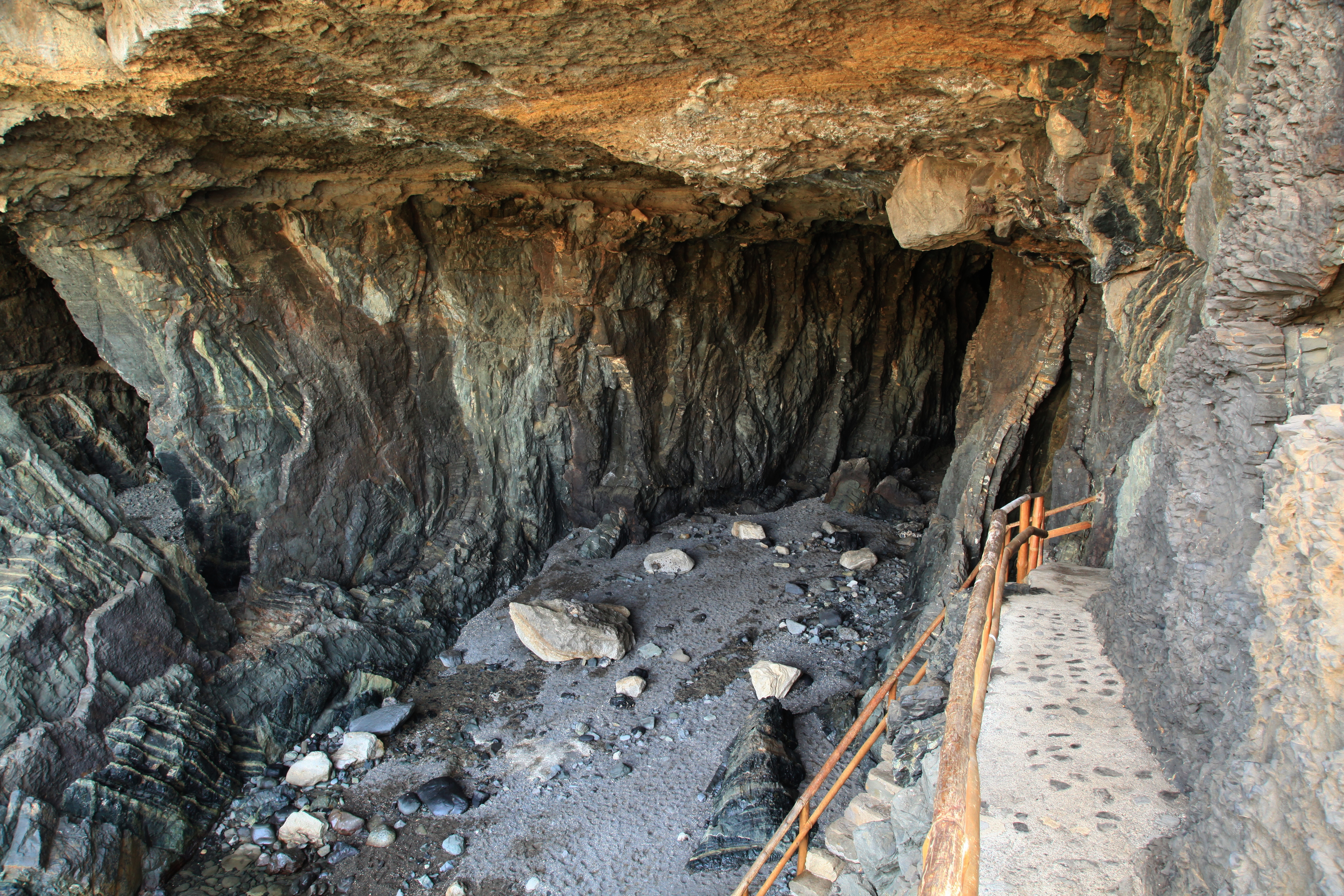
Cuevas de Ajuy 2012

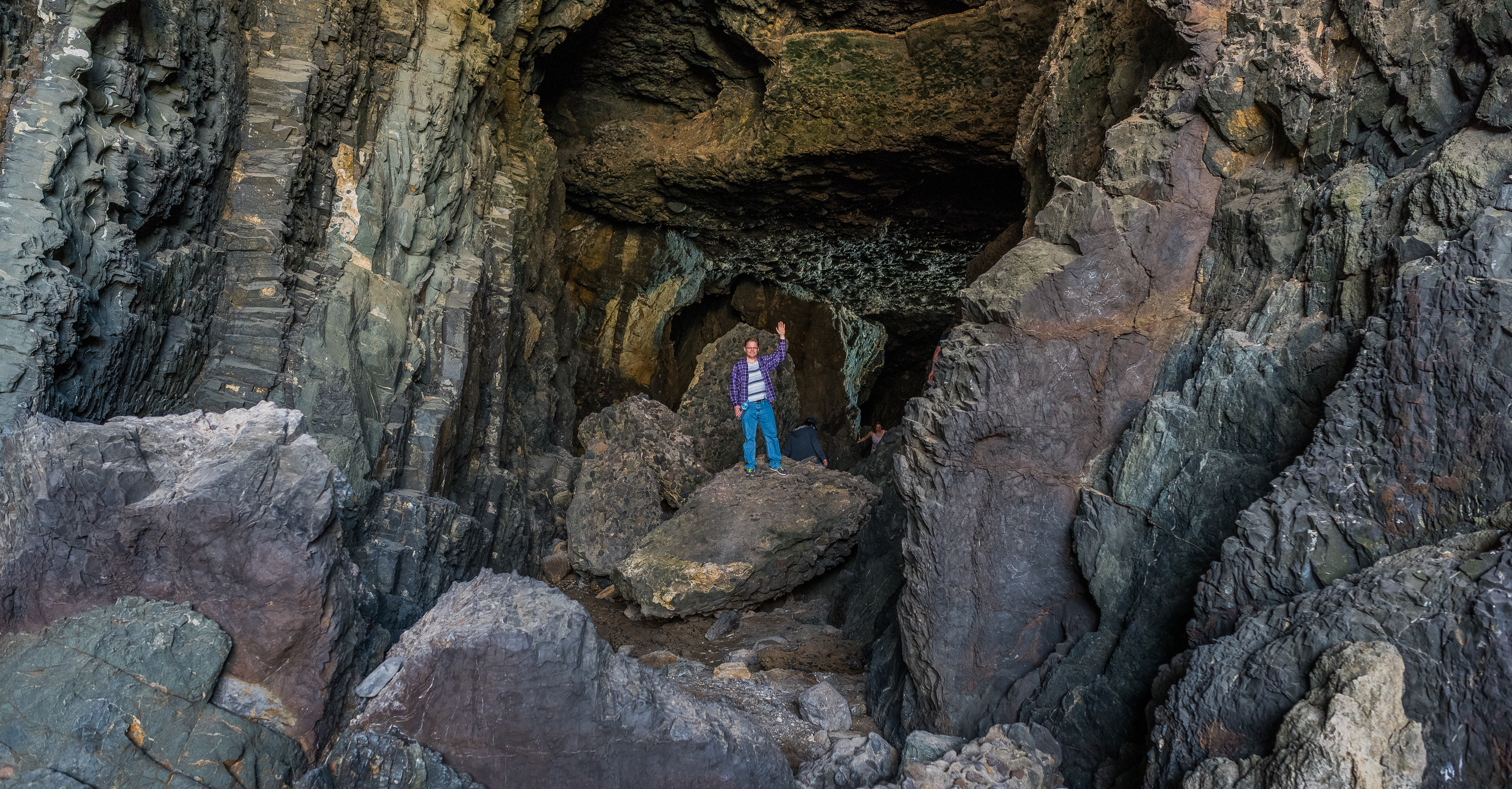
Cuevas de Ajuy 2016

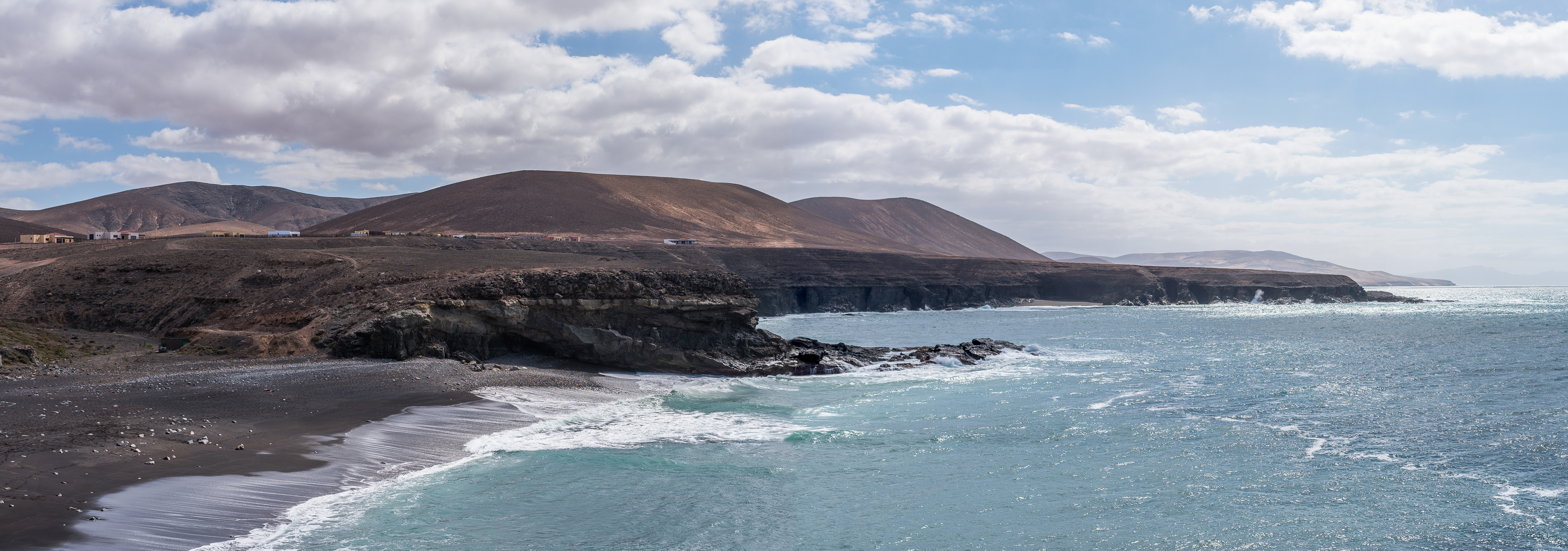
Cuevas de Ajuy 2016
