= Playa de Las Canteras =

Beach of La Palma de Gran Canaria, Canary Islands

- Las Canteras Beach
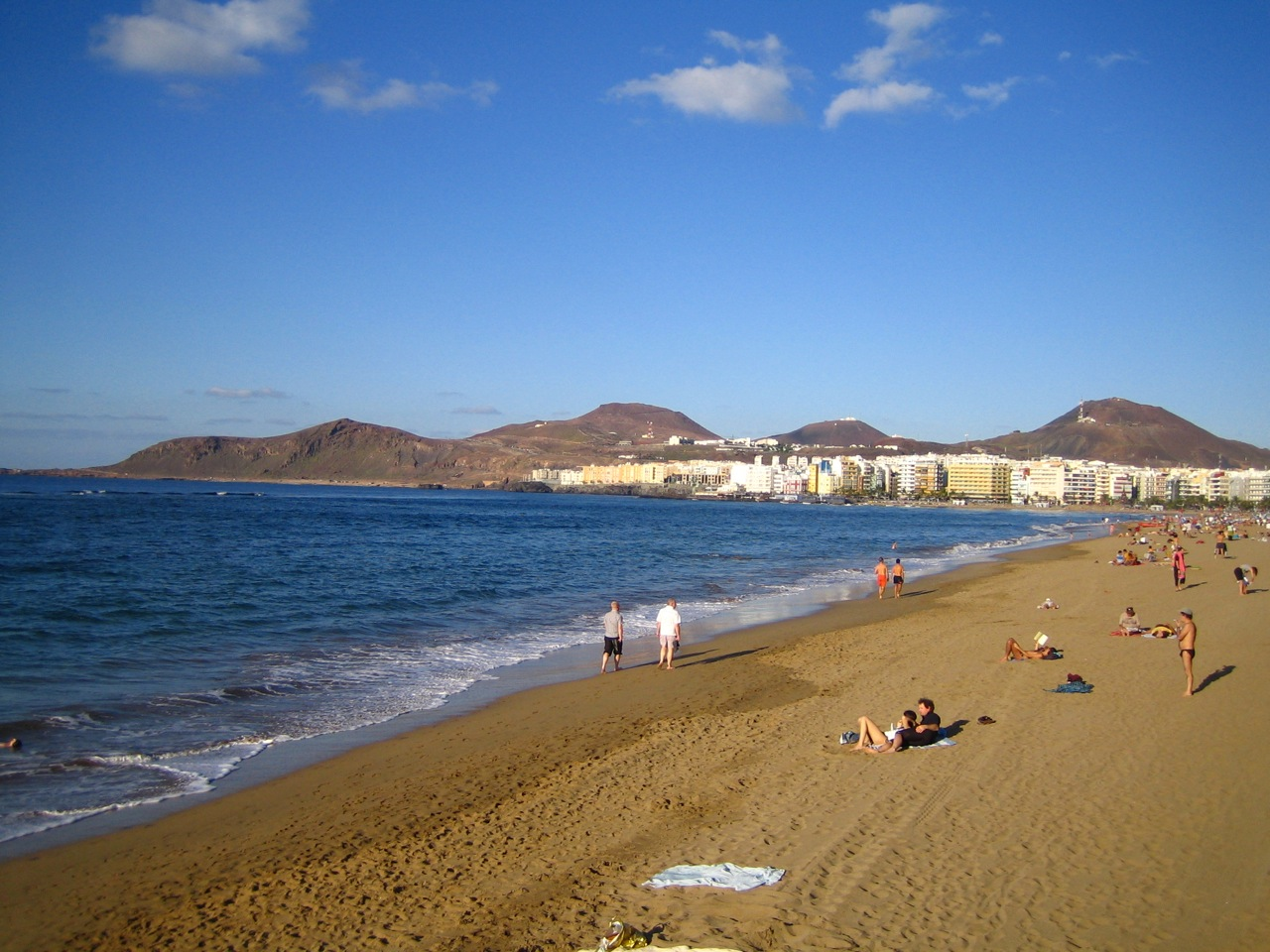
- View of Playa de Las Canteras

Location
- Country: Spain
- Coordinates: 28°08′24″N 15°26′10″W

Characteristics
- Length: 3100 m
- Width: 50 m
- Composition: Golden sand
- Type of sand: Fine sand
- Bathing conditions: Calm waters
- Level of occupancy: High
- Level of urbanization: Urban
- Promenade: Yes

Environmental aspects
- Presence of vegetation: Yes
- Protected area: Yes
- Blue flag: Yes

Security
- Surveillance equipment: Yes
- Danger signage: Yes
- Local police: Yes
- Rescue equipment: Yes

Accessibility
- Accessible to the disabled: Ramps and enabled area
- Type of access: Easy on foot / car / bus
- Access signage: Yes

The Playa de Las Canteras (Las Canteras beach; 'Beach of the Quarries') is the main urban beach of the city of Las Palmas de Gran Canaria, on the island of Gran Canaria in the Canary Islands. It is considered one of the most prominent beaches in the archipelago.

The beach operates under an Environmental Management System certified in accordance with the UNE-EN ISO 14001 standard. It has also received certification for universal accessibility for bathing services for people with reduced mobility from the same certifying body.

In addition, Playa de Las Canteras has been awarded the “Q for Tourism Quality” flag, the European Union Blue Flag, the ISO Environmental Management Certificate, and the Universal Accessibility Certificate, distinctions that recognize environmental management, service quality, and accessibility standards.

In 2013, the beach was ranked tenth in Spain in the “Travellers’ Choice Playas” awards, based on a study evaluating 276 beaches across Africa, Asia, the Caribbean, Central America, Europe, the Middle East, and the United States. In that ranking, Playa de Cofete placed sixth in Spain, while Playa de Las Catedrales ranked first nationally.

The name of the beach is historically associated with “La Barra,” a natural sandstone and calcareous reef that runs parallel to the shoreline. This formation shelters the beach from the north swell and contributes to its distinctive character. The beach was formerly known as “Playa del Arrecife” (“Reef Beach”), as La Barra emerged from the water like a reef. In the past, the reef was quarried (Spanish: cantera) for stone used in various construction projects in the city, including Cathedral of Santa Ana. Although quarrying has ceased, the name Playa de Las Canteras remains in reference to this historical activity.

== Situation ==
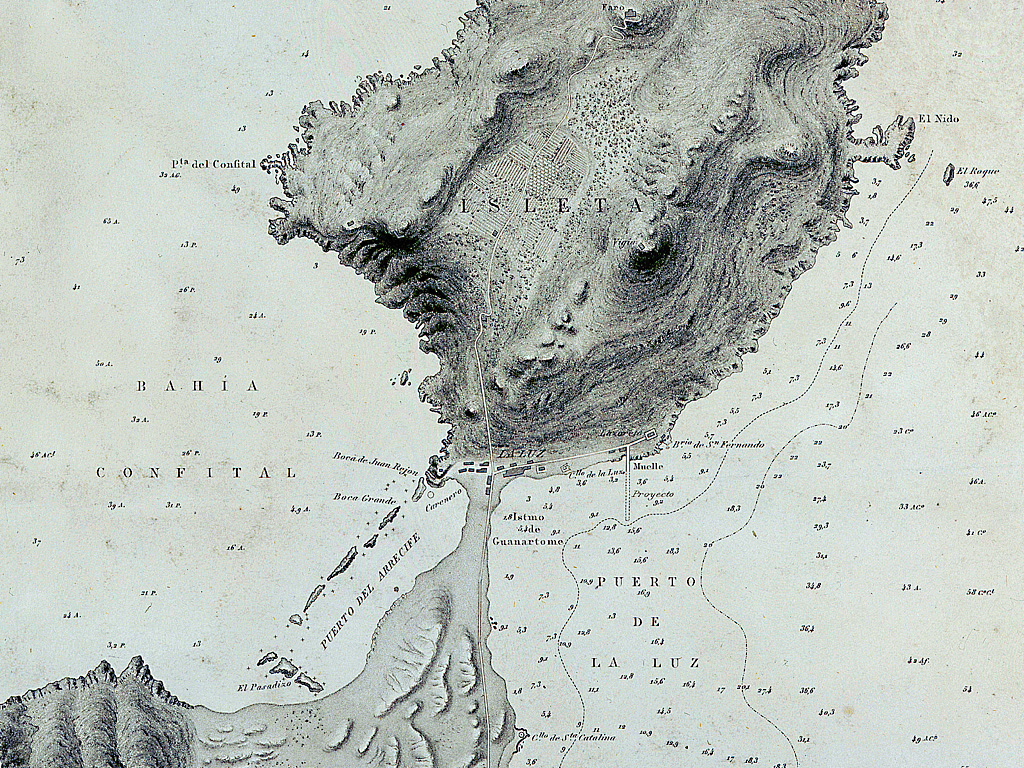
The isthmus of Guanarteme in 1879.

Playa de Las Canteras extends along the western side of the Isthmus of Guanarteme, a former strip of dunes and sand that connected the mountains of the La Isleta peninsula, to the northeast, with the rest of Gran Canaria. The beach is the longest of the existing ones in the city. It is the longest beach in Las Palmas de Gran Canaria. Oriented to the northwest, it lies within the bay known as El Confital and stretches for just over three kilometres of fine golden sand, from the foothills of La Isleta to near the mouth of the Tamaraceite ravine.

For most of its length, the beach is sheltered from Atlantic currents by a natural sandstone reef popularly known as “La Barra,” which runs parallel to the shore and can be reached by swimming from the beach. Along the inland edge of the coast runs the Paseo de Las Canteras, a pedestrian promenade extending parallel to the beach from the vicinity of the Alfredo Kraus Auditorium to the area known as La Puntilla, and continuing towards the surroundings of Playa del Confital. The latter area has traditionally been frequented by surfers and bodyboarders and is known for producing a notable right-hand wave.

Playa de Las Canteras comprises three sections corresponding to the arcs and curves formed along its shoreline, each with distinct morphological characteristics.

=== Arco norte (Northern arch) ===
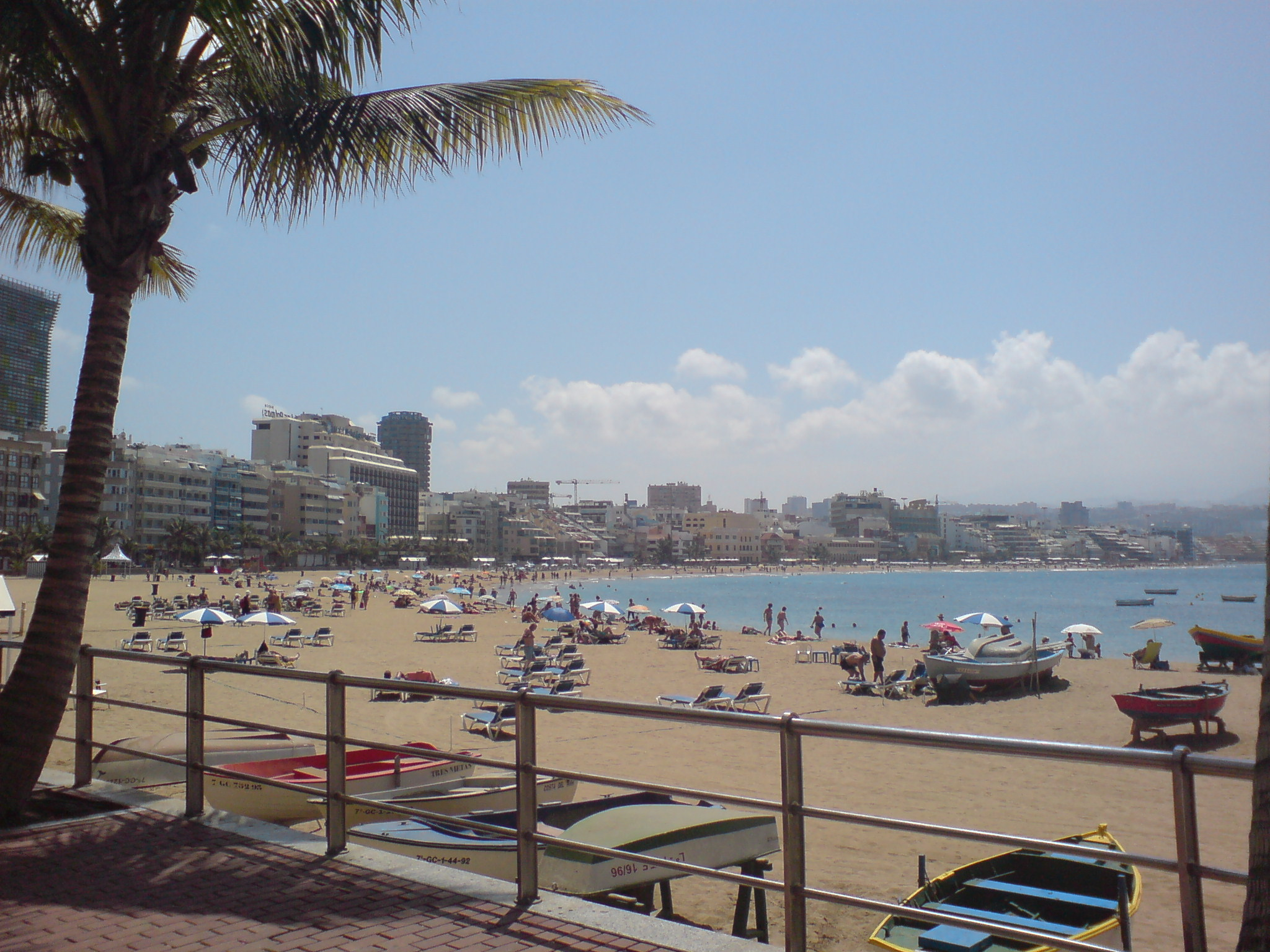
View of Las Canteras from La Puntilla, northern arch.

The northern arc, commonly referred to as Playa Grande, has an approximate length of 1,120 metres. Its width varies from around 20 metres in the southern sector to approximately 120 metres in the central area, and about 80 metres near La Puntilla in the north. This is the most sheltered part of the beach. For much of the year it is protected from wave action by the natural reef barrier (La Barra), and it is further shielded from storms with a north and northeast component by the mountains of the La Isleta peninsula. The principal section of the reef, known as the barra principal or barra grande, is frequently accessed by swimmers from the shore. At low tide, when parts of the reef emerge, various seabirds can be observed resting on it, including groups of gulls. La Puntilla marks the northern end of the beach and is the area where the greatest accumulation of sand occurs, a result of the beach’s natural sediment dynamics, which have been affected by urban development on the isthmus.

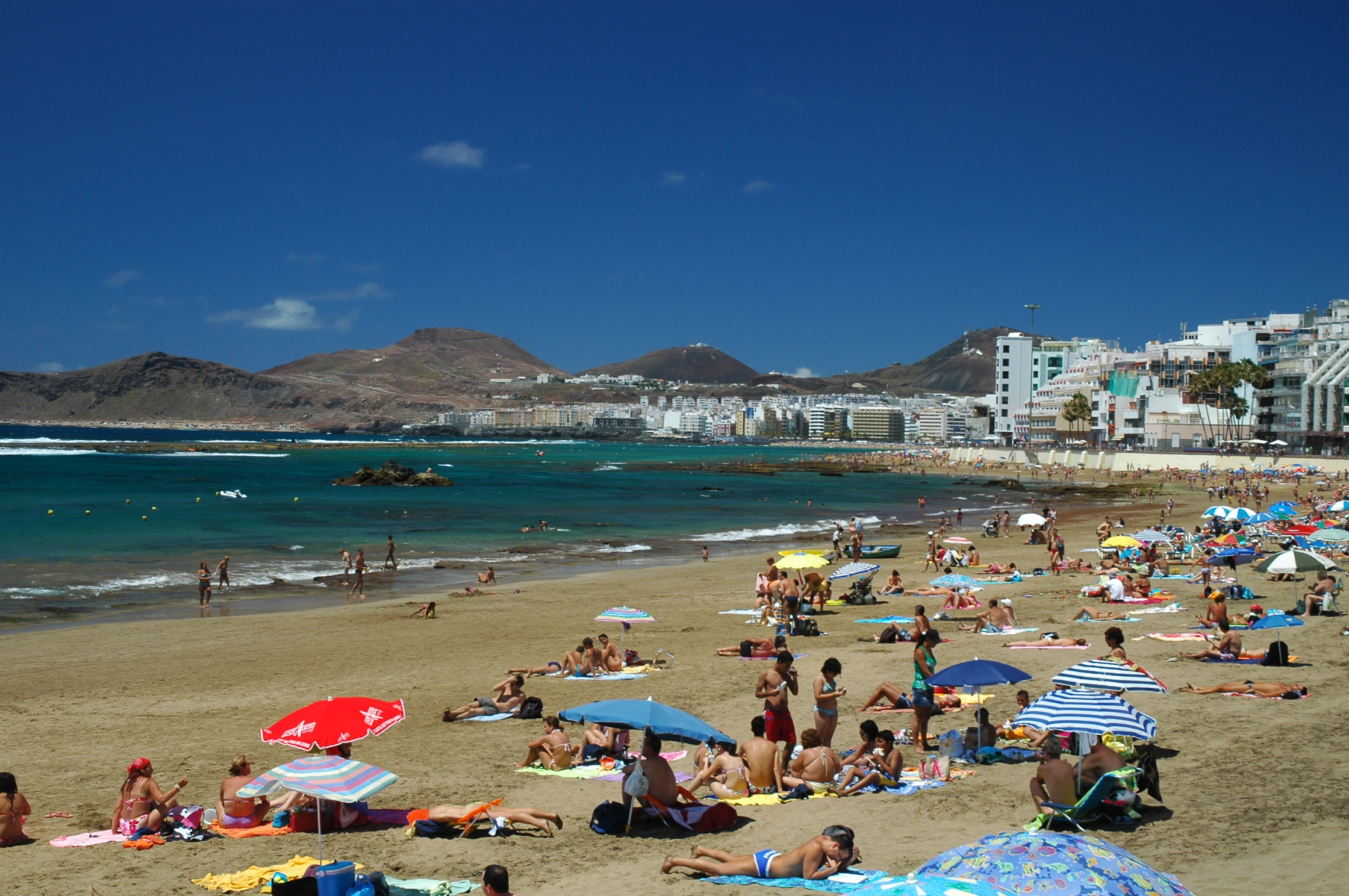
La Peña de la Vieja and Los Lisos, central arch.

=== Arco central (Central arch) ===
The central arc extends for approximately 760 metres. It is about 80 metres wide at its southern end and narrows in the middle section to around 40 metres along its northern side. Within this stretch is a smaller indentation known as Playa Chica, one of the most distinctive areas of Playa de Las Canteras. Playa Chica measures roughly 120 metres in length and, at low tide, reaches a maximum width of about 80 metres at the centre of the arch, narrowing to around 20 metres at its ends. The shoreline in this sector is the rockiest of the beach, with a higher presence of stones and outcrops. As a result, sand transport here is less variable than in the southern arc, and there is generally a net loss of sediment. The central arc is protected by the peña central (central rock), the southern head of the main reef barrier (barra principal), and a smaller, separate reef formation known as the barra amarilla (“yellow bar”). Approximately 60 metres from the shore lies the Peña de la Vieja, one of the most well-known rock formations of the beach, measuring about 15 metres in diameter at its base. Other rocky outcrops are also present in this area; many emerge at low tide, while some remain permanently exposed. The gap between the barra amarilla and the barra principal, popularly known as el pasadizo (“the passageway”), is sufficiently deep to allow the passage of small vessels even at low tide. This opening also facilitates the movement of marine fauna between the open sea and the interior waters of the bay.

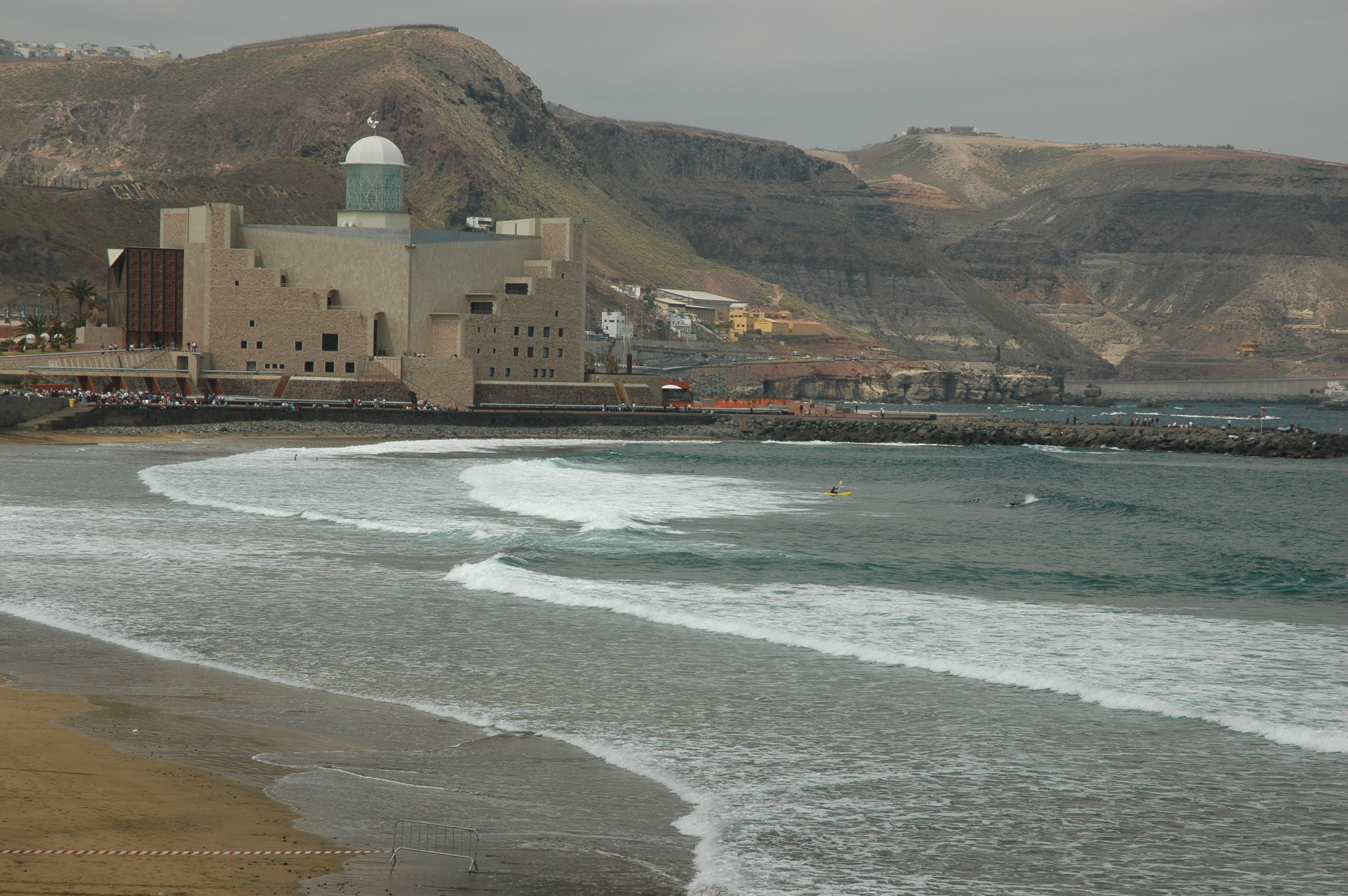
End of La Cícer, Los Muellitos and the Alfredo Kraus Auditorium; southern arch.

=== Arco sur (Southern arch) ===
The southern arc corresponds to Playa de La Cícer, also known as Playa de Guanarteme, and includes the areas of Punta de Núñez and Los Muellitos, located behind the Alfredo Kraus Auditorium. This section extends along approximately 1,080 metres of coastline, with an average width of about 80 metres at low tide. Unlike the northern and central arcs, this area is not protected by La Barra and is therefore more exposed to wave action. Consequently, its beach profile is more variable. The sand is predominantly fine-grained and somewhat more compact than in other sections of Playa de Las Canteras, which reduces the rate at which it is carried offshore. At the southern end, near Los Muellitos, there is a permanent accumulation of pebbles, as well as some stony areas in the central zone near the low-tide line. Punta de Núñez is a rocky outcrop that is directly exposed to the swell affecting the northern sector of the bay. “Los Muellitos” refers to two breakwaters constructed perpendicular to Punta de Núñez, which enclose a small pebble beach approximately 50 metres in length. One of the breakwaters measures about 100 metres in length and the other, located further south, around 60 metres; both are approximately 25 metres wide. Together with La Puntilla at the northern end, these structures form part of the natural and constructed boundaries of Playa de Las Canteras. Approximately midway along the southern arc lies the mouth of the La Ballena ravine, a normally dry watercourse with occasional runoff that reaches the beach during periods of rainfall.

== Map of the area ==
Map of Playa de Las Canteras (2007).

== Geological formation ==
La Isleta was originally a separate islet, divided from Gran Canaria by a strait approximately one kilometre wide. To its southeast lay the Isthmus of Guanarteme, a sandy strip that gradually connected La Isleta to the main island, forming the present-day peninsula. The isthmus measured about 4.12 kilometres in length and slightly more than 200 metres at its narrowest point, widening at both ends. Its western margin is occupied by Playa de Las Canteras, while the eastern side is the site of Puerto de La Luz.

The isthmus originally supported an extensive dune field formed by sand deposited by marine currents and subsequently transported inland by the prevailing trade winds. Cartographic records indicate that the dunes remained largely intact until the mid-19th century. Subsequent urban expansion, however, led to their progressive degradation and near disappearance.

Although the isthmus is physically linked to La Isleta, limited geological data are available regarding the precise composition of the materials underlying it. In a 1962 study, the Finnish geologist Hausen proposed that the city of Las Palmas de Gran Canaria is situated on a fluvial terrace composed of phonolitic conglomerates deposited after the Miocene epoch. According to this hypothesis, these materials were carried by the Guiniguada ravine during a period of marine regression associated with increased volcanic activity on the island. During this time, La Isleta is thought to have emerged as an islet as a result of volcanic eruptions that continued into the Quaternary period.

Marine currents flowing between La Isleta and Gran Canaria initially hindered the consolidation of the strait. Over time, however, successive fluvial deposits and the accumulation of calcareous sediments from abundant marine fauna—particularly shell fragments and oyster beds—contributed to cementation processes. The gradual infilling of the channel ultimately produced a tombolo, forming the Isthmus of Guanarteme and permanently linking La Isleta, now a peninsula, to the rest of the island.

The original tombolo formed a beach whose shoreline extended approximately to the present location of La Barra, the natural reef that runs parallel to Playa de Las Canteras. Freshwater runoff from the La Ballena ravine may have contributed to the compaction and lithification of beach sediments, leading to the formation of the rock substrate visible today. Over time, wave action and prevailing winds shaped La Barra and the adjacent rocky outcrops into their current forms.

Historically known as Bahía del Arrecife, Playa de Las Canteras consists predominantly of fine, light-coloured sand. The sediment contains small crystals of olivine and pyroxene, as well as organic components derived from fragmented shells, locally referred to in the Canary Islands as confite. At low tide, rocky outcrops emerge from the water, likely corresponding to the underlying substrate upon which both the beach sands and the isthmus are deposited.

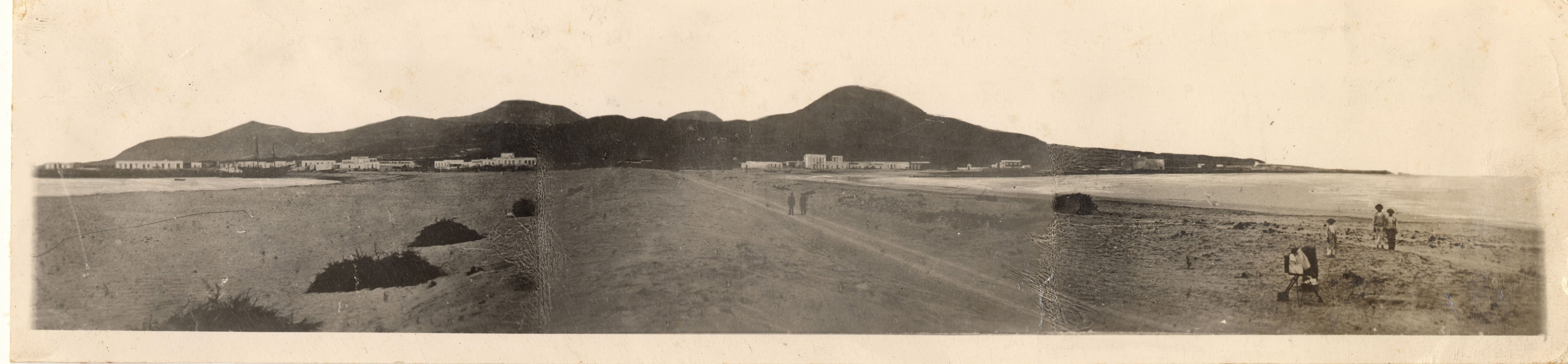
Panoramic view of the isthmus of Guanarteme in 1880. On the left is the Bahía del Confital, where today's Playa de Las Canteras stretches out, and on the right is the Bahía de Las Isletas or La Luz, where the city's port is located today. In the background, the volcanoes of La Isleta, with the first houses of the neighborhood that bears its name extending at their feet.

== History ==
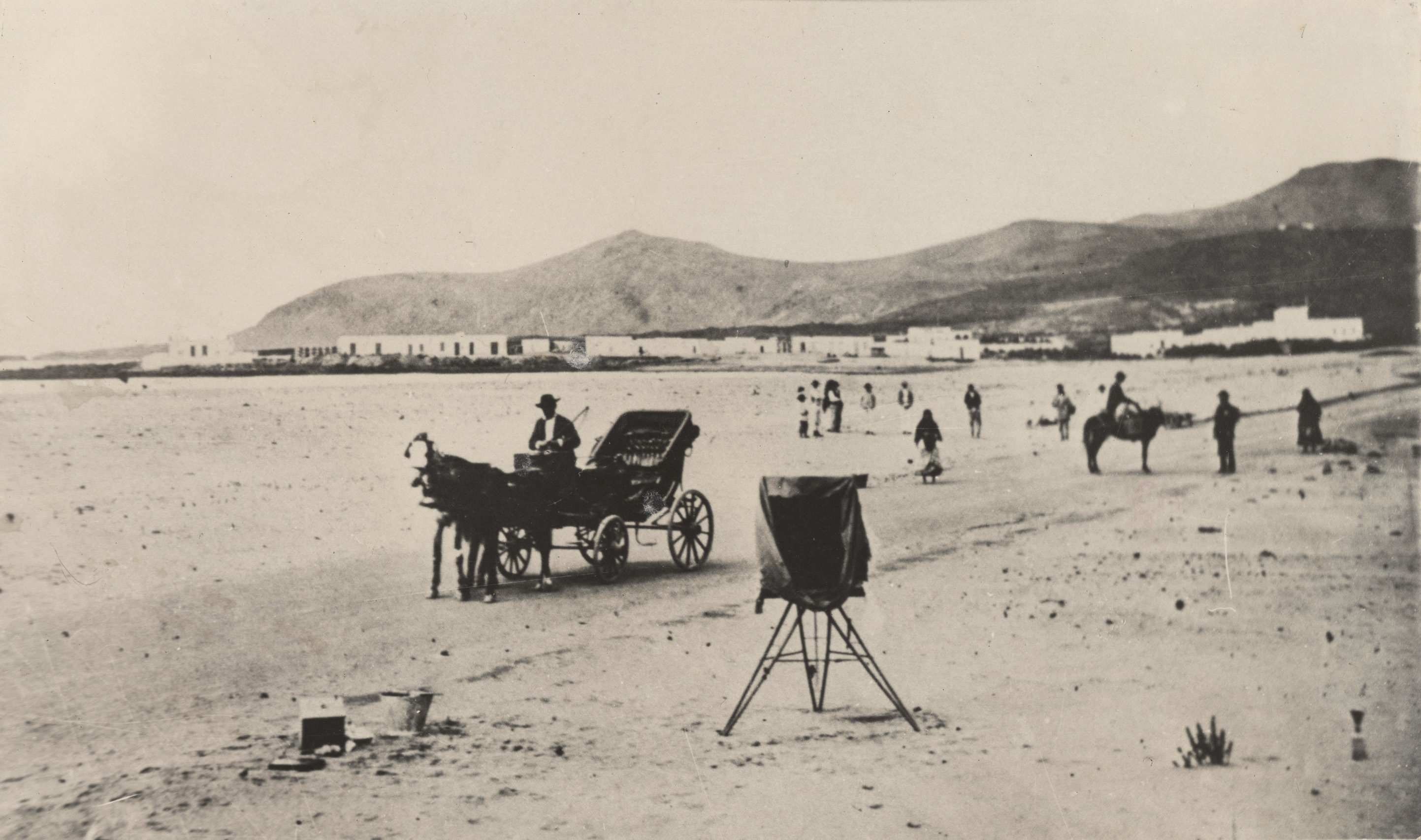
Sandbanks of the isthmus in 1885.

The former dune and sand strip that constituted the Isthmus of Guanarteme has largely disappeared. Today, only Playa de Las Canteras to the west and Playa de Las Alcaravaneras to the east remain as partial remnants of what was once an extensive dune system.

At the end of the 19th century, the previously sparsely populated area began to experience development, stimulated in part by the growth of Puerto de La Luz. Housing gradually spread across the dune field, eventually consolidating the urban neighbourhood of Santa Catalina.

Urban construction altered the natural circulation of sand driven by wind and marine processes. As buildings obstructed the movement of sand inland, sediment accumulated and contributed to changes in the configuration of the isthmus.

The earliest documented references to the beach date from the 15th century. Earlier cartographic representations from around 1410 and 1460 depict La Isleta as separated from Gran Canaria, suggesting that the isthmus may at times have been partially submerged. At the time of the Conquest of the island of the island in 1479, records indicate that travel between the port area and the city was often carried out by boat.

In the 16th century, the Puerto del Arrecife is mentioned as a point of embarkation and disembarkation, although subordinate to the main port of the city. Around 1686, the first detailed plan of the isthmus was drawn by the engineer Pedro Agustín del Castillo; it depicts the Bahía del Arrecife and a series of reefs corresponding to La Barra. At that time, the urban centre of Las Palmas de Gran Canaria was considerably smaller, and the beach lay several kilometres from the town. It remained a relatively isolated area, visited mainly by those travelling on foot or by cart across fields and dunes, by fishermen and hunters heading to La Isleta, or by merchants using the anchorage sheltered by La Isleta.

In the 19th century, infrastructure improvements facilitated access to the area. In 1855, work began on a road connecting the beach and the port with the historic urban centre. In 1890, a public tram service was inaugurated between Vegueta and Puerto del Refugio. These developments contributed to a gradual increase in visitors. By around 1910, the first buildings had been constructed along the beachfront. Contemporary accounts indicate that on busy days the beach attracted approximately two hundred people, most of whom visited for promenading rather than bathing, as prevailing social norms at the time discouraged sea bathing in the manner common today.

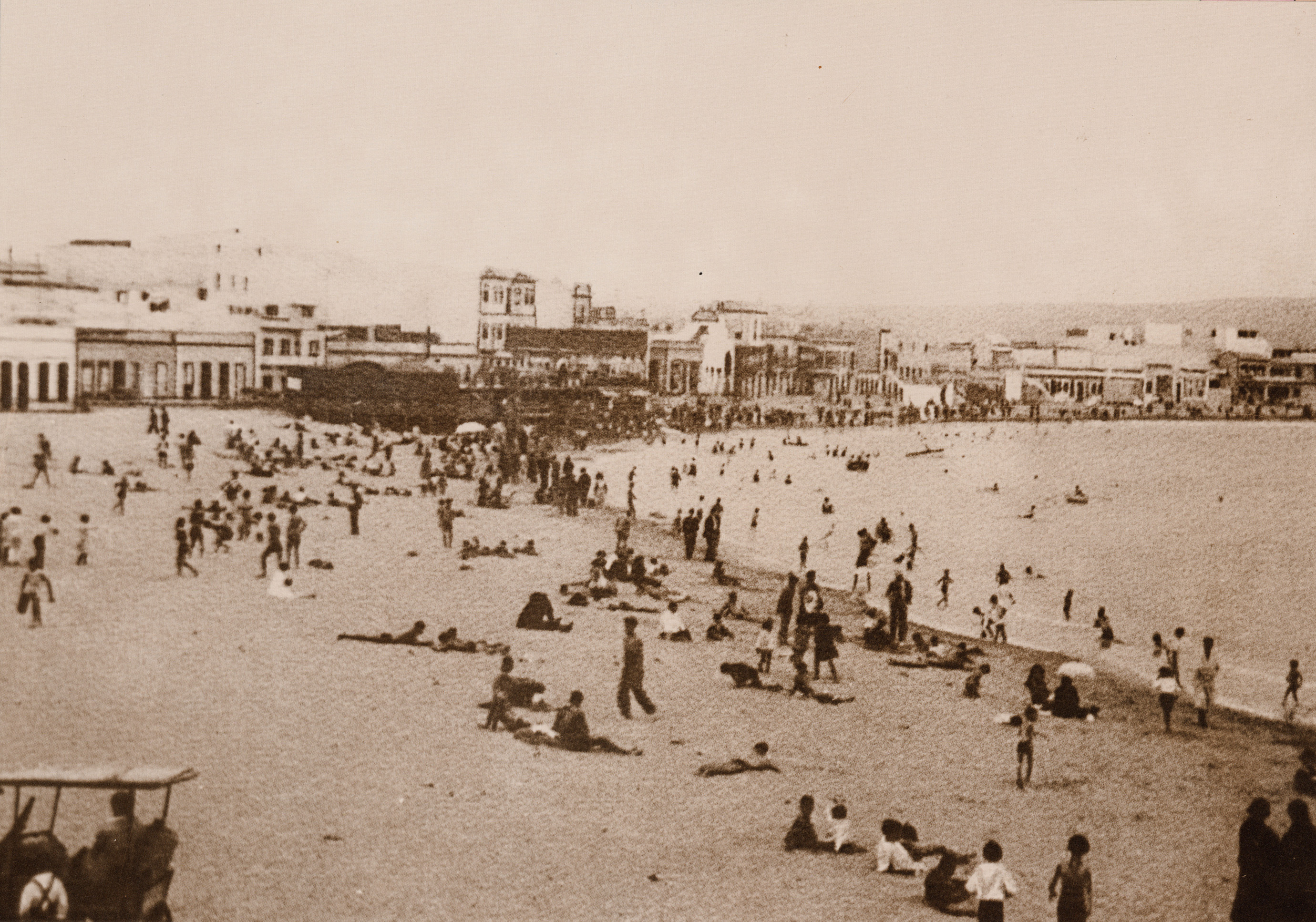
Beach landscape and first urban development (1925).

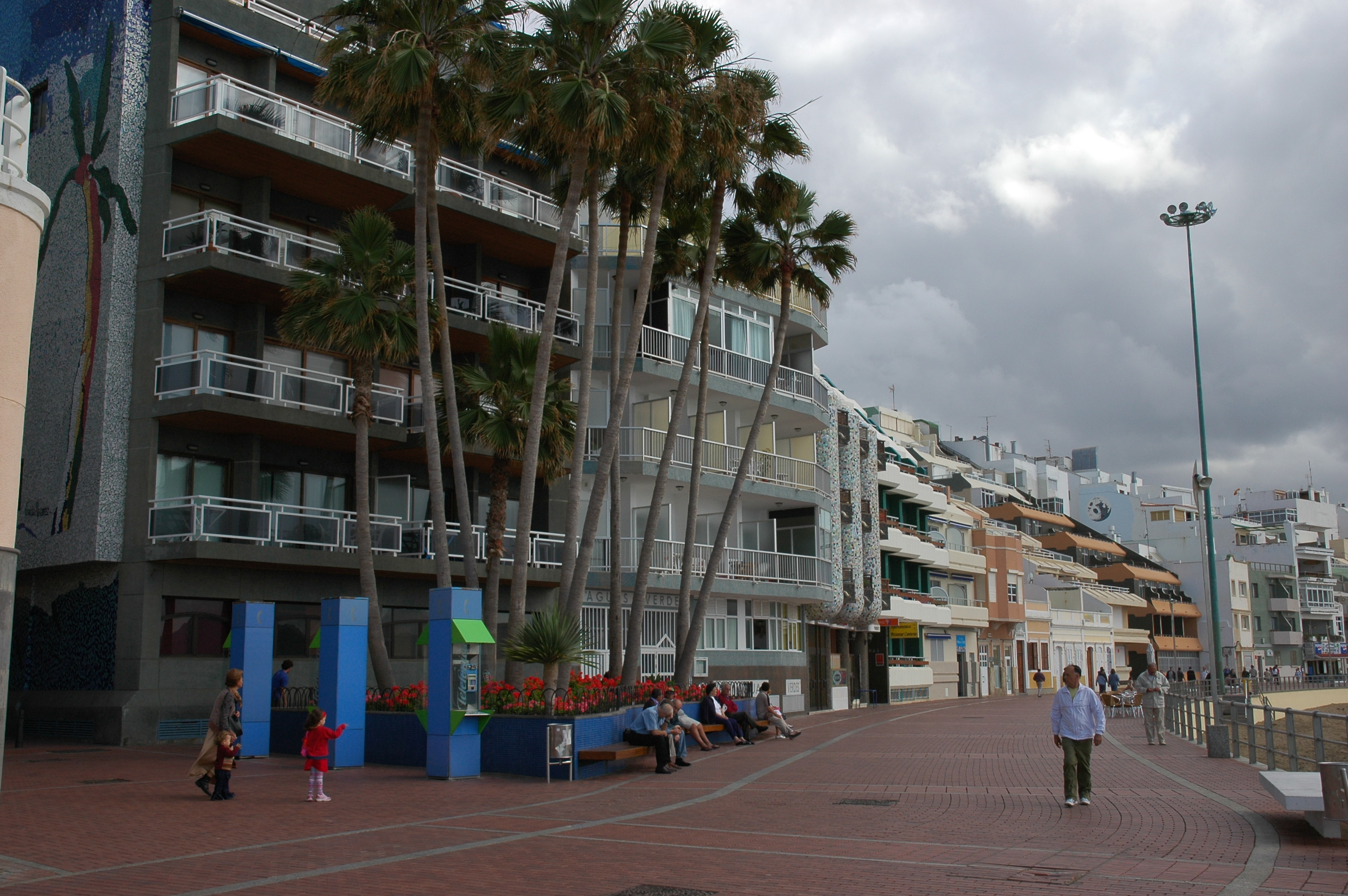
Paseo de Las Canteras, Plaza Pinito del Oro (2004).

=== Urban development ===
From the late 19th century, the beach became widely known as Las Canteras. The name derives from the extraction of sandstone from La Barra for use in filtration systems in local water distilleries, a practice that was eventually discontinued. During this period, increased maritime activity associated with the San Telmo pier stimulated the presence of shipwrights and related trades in the Bahía del Arrecife, which served as a careening area. Apart from a small settlement at La Puntilla, where some of these workers lived, the surrounding area remained largely uninhabited.

In 1883, construction began on Puerto de La Luz, marking a turning point in the urbanization of the isthmus. That same year, the municipal architect Francisco de la Torre proposed an urban plan that framed the beach with a broad avenue, anticipating the later development of the seafront promenade. Following approval of the project, the first houses were built, many of them summer residences for affluent families.

Several early 20th-century buildings associated with this period of seasonal use remain. Among them are the former Marine Command building (Fernando Navarro, 1913), an eclectic three-storey structure with corner towers; the Mesa y López building (Miguel Martín, 1923), designed as a multi-family recreational residence with features influenced by Central European architectural models; and the San José clinic (Laureano Arroyo, 1895; Rafael Masanet, 1928), originally conceived as a combined hospital, school, and charitable institution. Adjacent to it on Padre Cueto Street stands the Church of San José (Laureano Arroyo, 1905).

Over the course of the 20th century, the character of the beachfront evolved significantly. The two-storey bourgeois residences that predominated until the mid-century gradually gave way to tourist accommodation and apartment buildings, alongside the renovation and construction of private housing.

Various urban planning proposals were advanced during the century but not implemented in full. In 1943, the architect Secundino Zuazo Ugalde proposed the construction of two dikes parallel to the coastline, reclaiming land from the sea for buildings, public spaces, and a small sports harbour. The plan was not adopted by the municipal authorities.

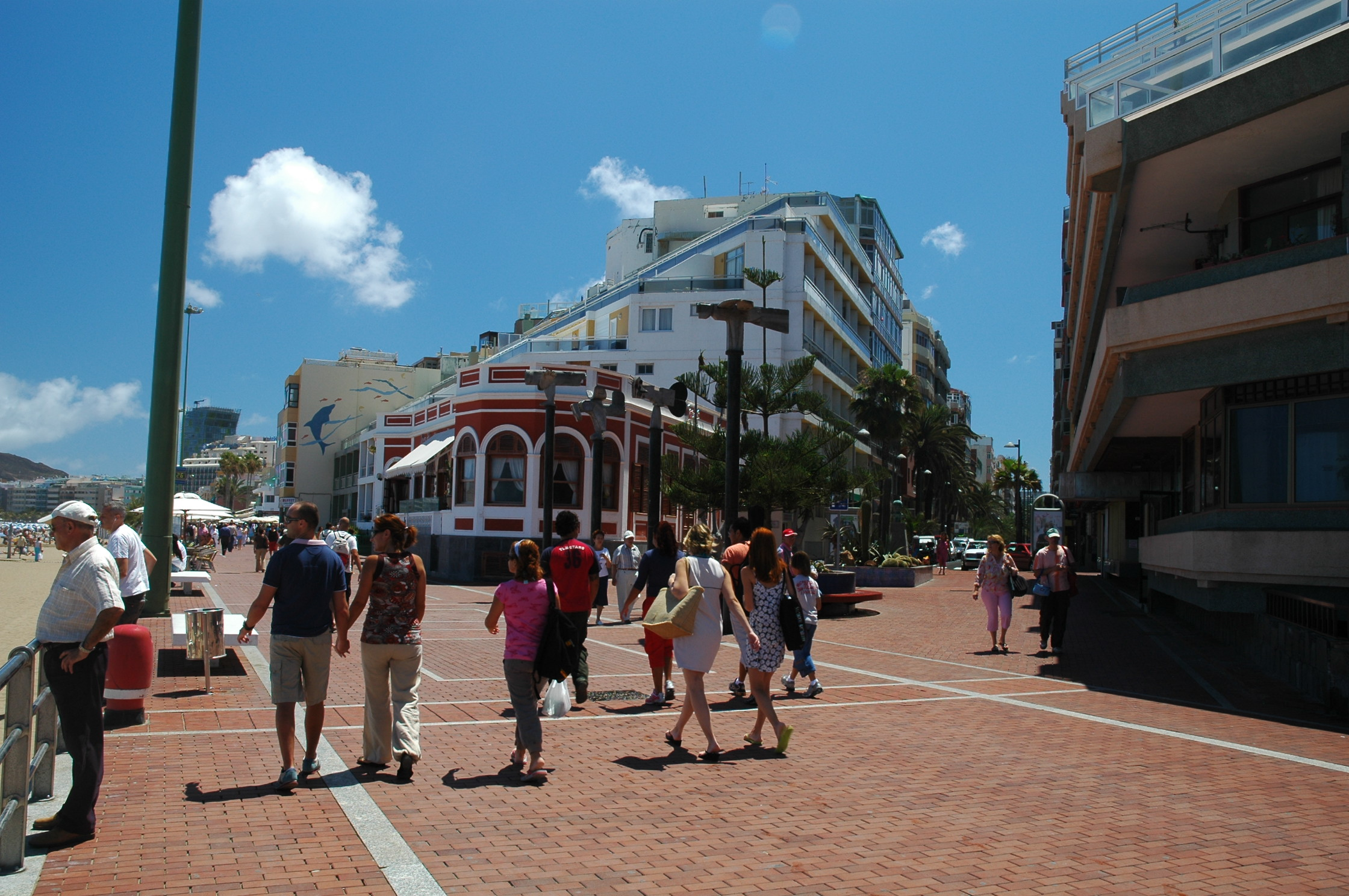
Paseo de Las Canteras, sculptural group of the Luis Morote street (2007).

In 1991, the city council initiated a major refurbishment of the promenade, which since its construction in the 1930s had undergone only limited maintenance. The renovation included the replacement of paving, lighting, and street furniture, as well as the installation of an underground service gallery to accommodate utilities and reduce the need for future excavation. The project was carried out in phases, extending from the La Isleta sector to the vicinity of the Alfredo Kraus Auditorium in the Guanarteme district. Converging streets were also refurbished and pedestrianized using materials consistent with those of the promenade.

Subsequent extensions have expanded the promenade at both ends. To the north, it continues beyond La Puntilla toward the area of El Confital, adapting to a more rugged coastal landscape characterized by volcanic rock formations. To the south, the beachfront—traditionally considered to end at La Cícer—now extends toward the vicinity of the auditorium and the Plaza de la Música.

=== The arrival of tourism ===
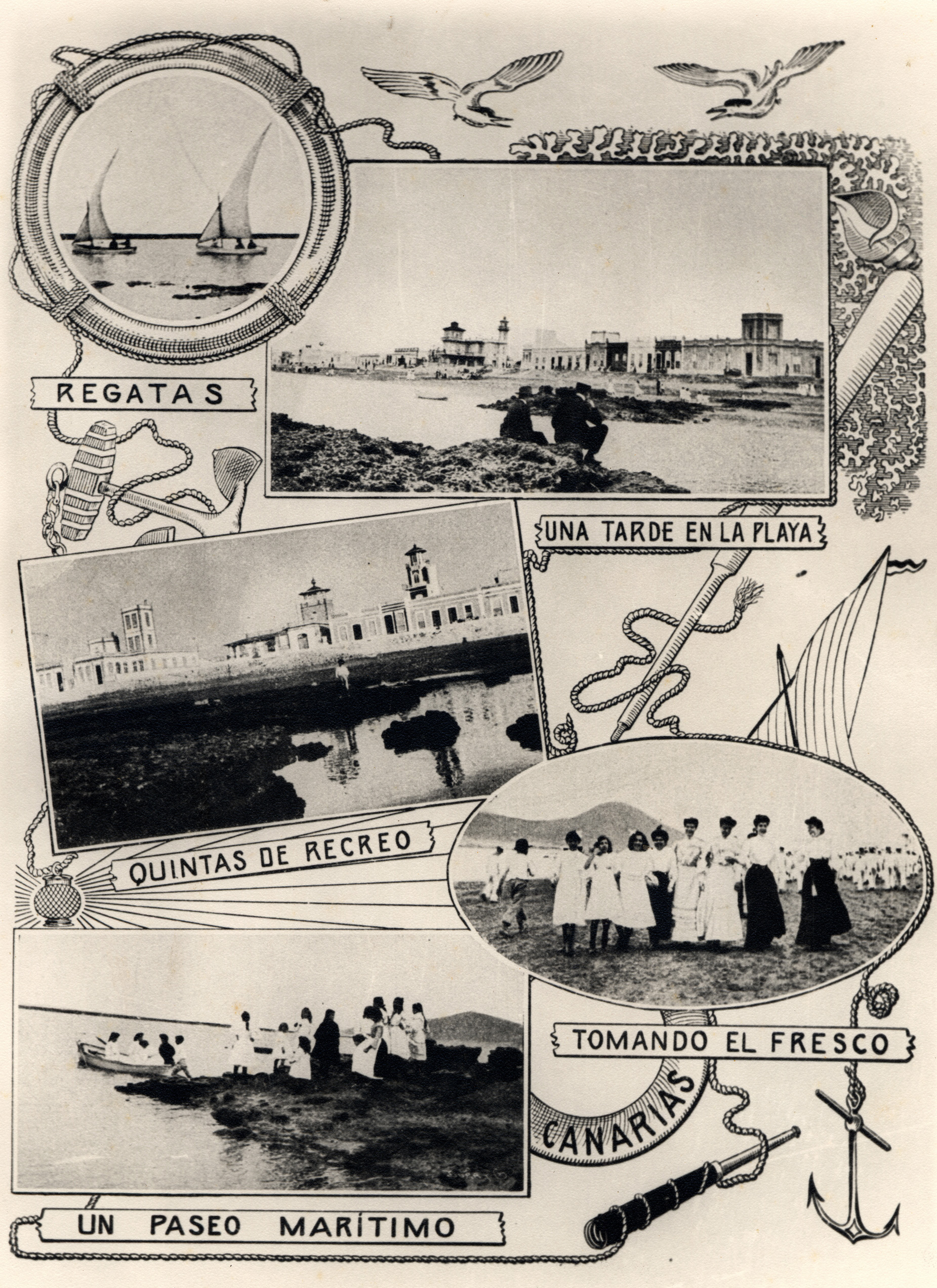
Advertising of the beach (1910).

During the early decades of the 20th century, British and French residents were among the first to promote tourism in Las Canteras. Many had initially arrived in connection with commercial activity linked to Puerto de La Luz, but a number settled permanently in Las Palmas de Gran Canaria, forming a sizeable foreign community. Their presence contributed to the introduction of certain social customs, including sea bathing as a leisure activity, and to the organization of early group visits by compatriots.

Sea bathing had gained popularity among European bourgeois and aristocratic elites in the 19th century and, after the First World War, became more widespread among the middle classes. By the beginning of the 20th century, tourists were known to frequent the city’s beaches, and local spas were advertised in the press. The novel Gran Canaria (1933) by A. J. Cronin portrays aspects of this early phase of tourism.

Notable visitors during this period included Agatha Christie and Bronisław Malinowski. The city developed a hotel infrastructure partly supported by British investment and established itself as a winter resort destination. The mild climate of the Canary Islands was a central attraction for northern European visitors. Over time, tourism also influenced local residents, whose traditional relationship with the coast had been primarily connected to fishing and maritime labour.

In the 1960s, the city experienced an influx of Swedish tourists, whose presence coincided with changing social norms regarding beach attire, including the adoption of bikinis and, in some cases, topless sunbathing.

Following the end of the Second World War, development around the beach accelerated. British-owned establishments had already introduced facilities such as bathing huts and small seaside accommodations. In the 1950s, local entrepreneurs increasingly recognized the economic potential of organized tourism. At that time, the island had limited hotel capacity, and Las Canteras, situated near the port, emerged as a focal point for expansion.

In 1956, the first tourist accommodations on the beach consisted of converted houses in the La Puntilla area, providing approximately 400 beds. In subsequent years, purpose-built hotels were established. Among the early establishments were the Hotel Gran Canaria and, in 1964, the Hotel Caracolas.[5] Other hotels followed, including the Hotel Verol (inaugurated in 1967). In 1970, the Hotel Cristina opened in a prominent beachfront location, offering more than 300 rooms. The Hotel Reina Isabel, inaugurated in 1965 and currently operated by Bull Hotels, also became one of the principal establishments in the area.

By the late 1970s, tourism in Las Canteras declined as visitor flows shifted toward other destinations. In response, municipal authorities promoted environmental rehabilitation and infrastructure improvements. A comprehensive renovation of the promenade began in January 1991, including the refurbishment of Avenida de Las Canteras and adjacent streets. These interventions aimed to modernize the seafront and restore its attractiveness after decades of limited investment.

== Surroundings and environment ==
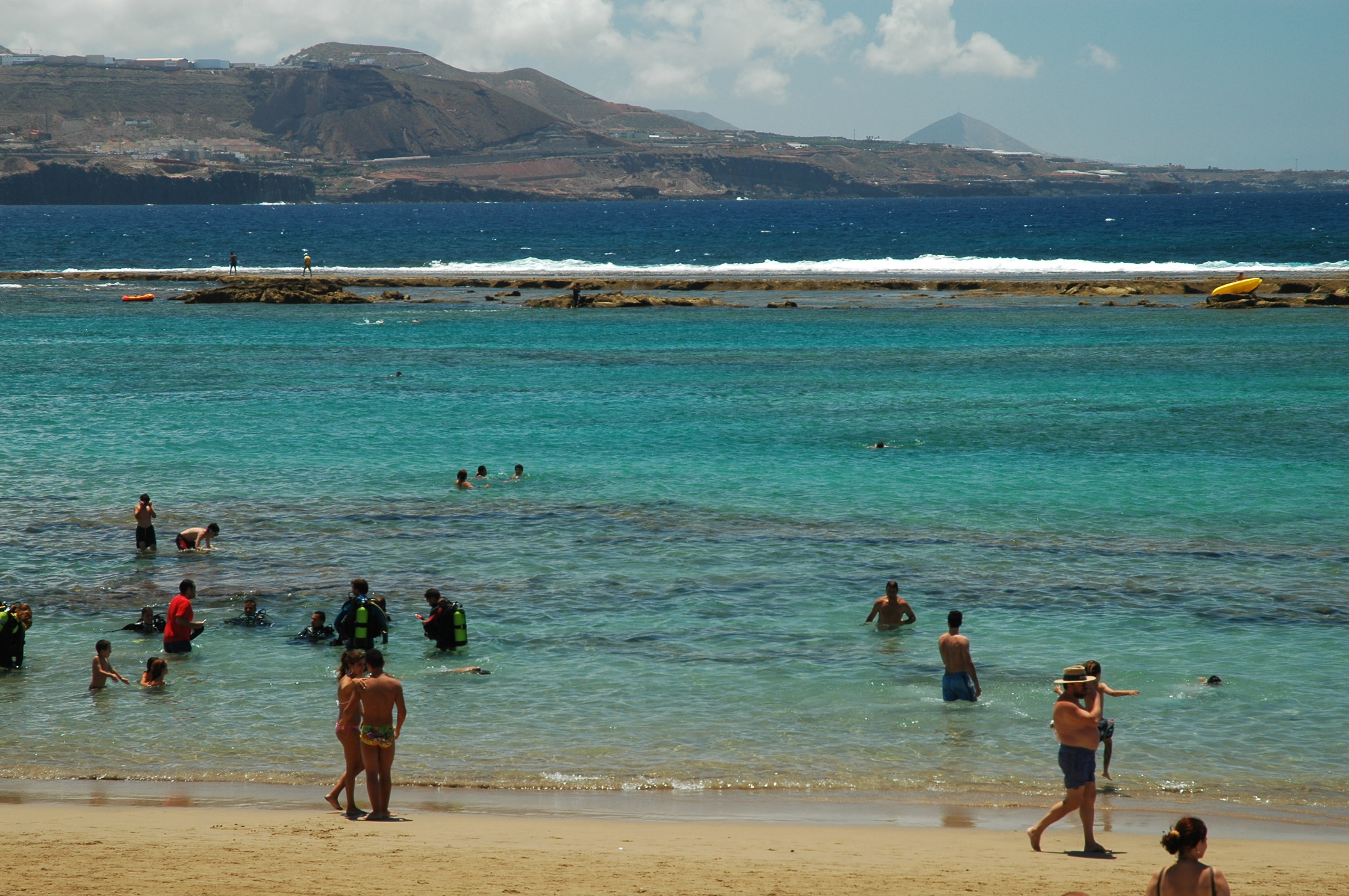
Partial view of La Barra.

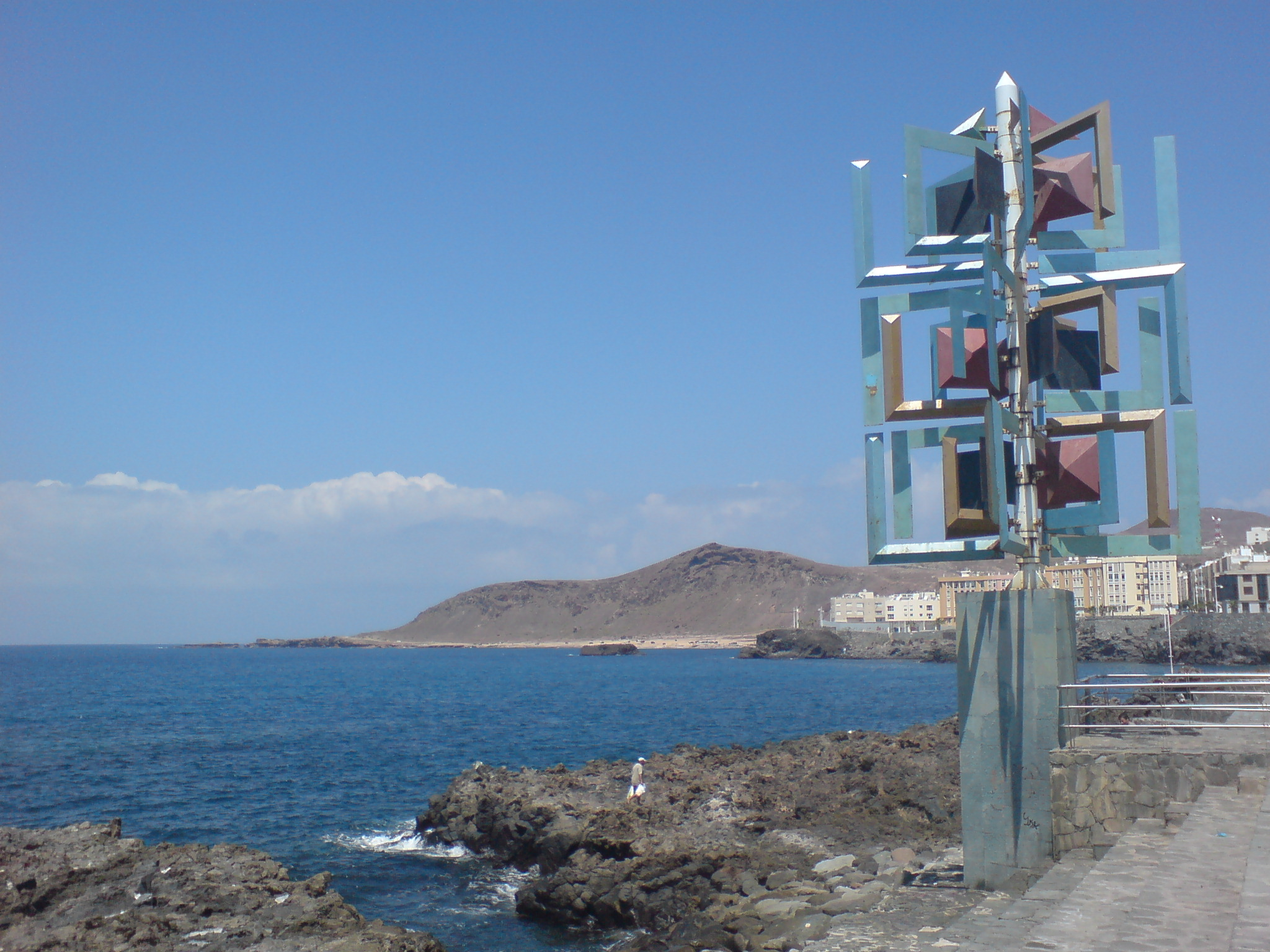
Juguete del Viento by César Manrique.

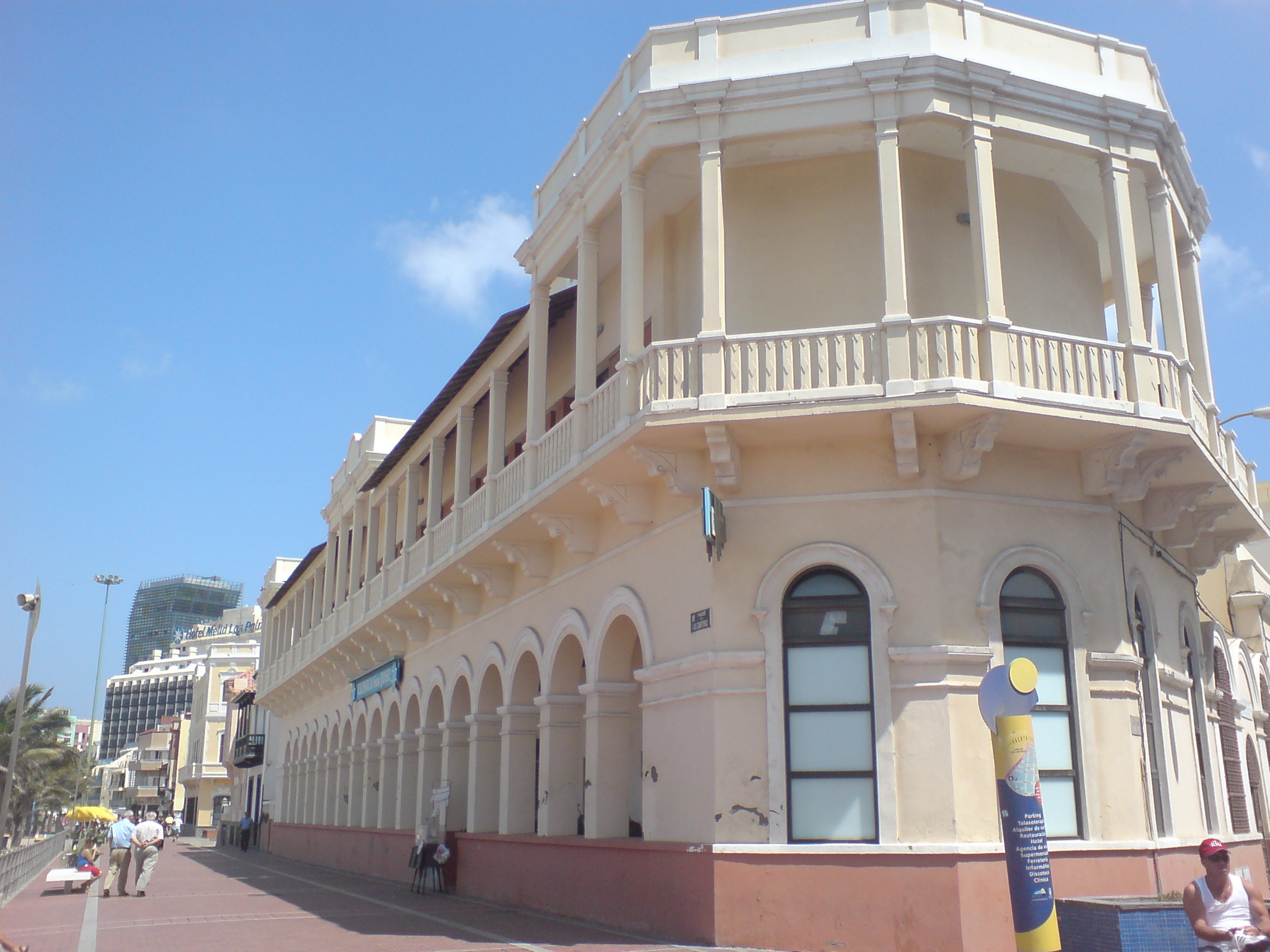
San José Clinic.

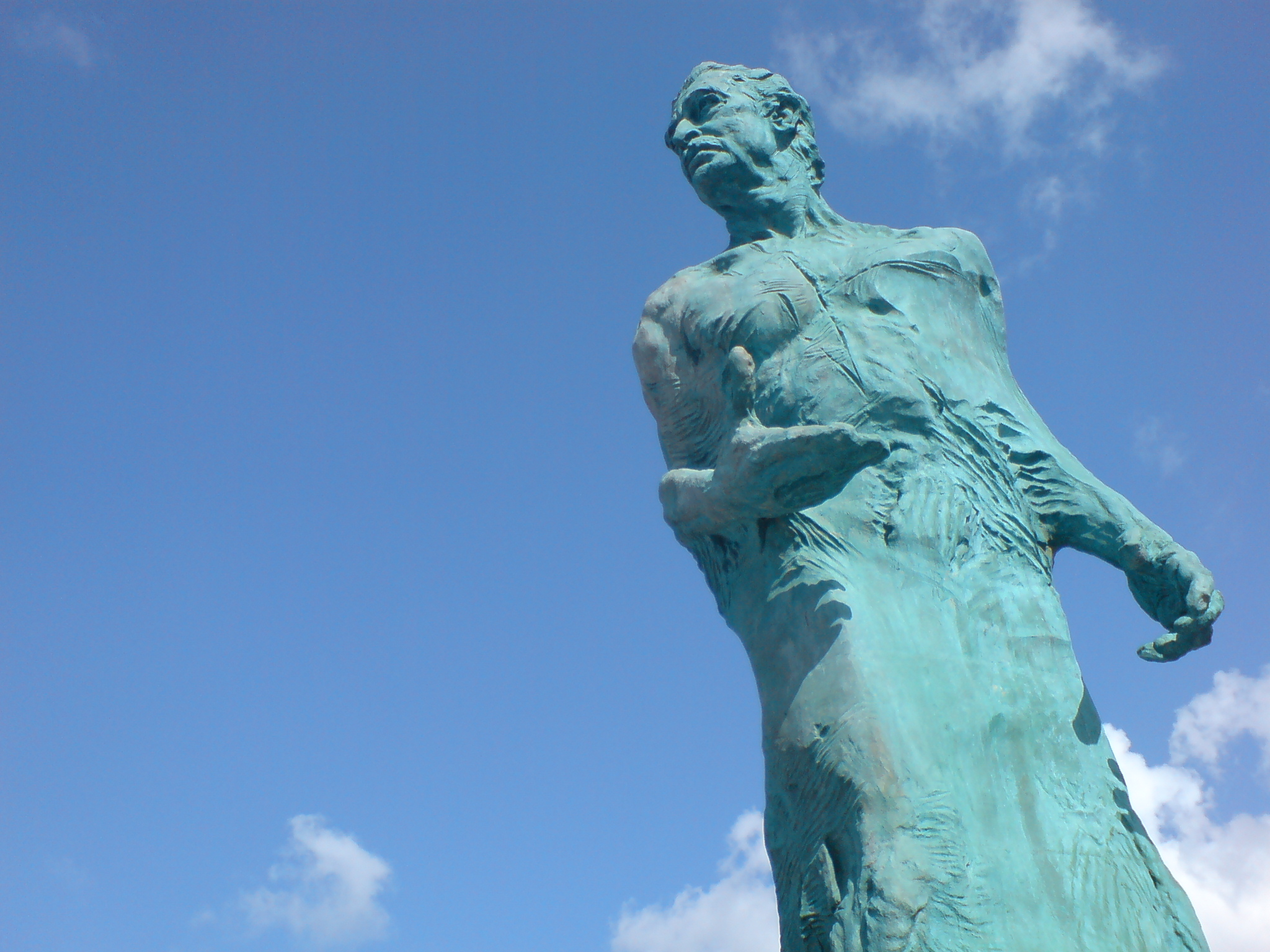
Monument to Alfredo Kraus by Victor Ochoa.

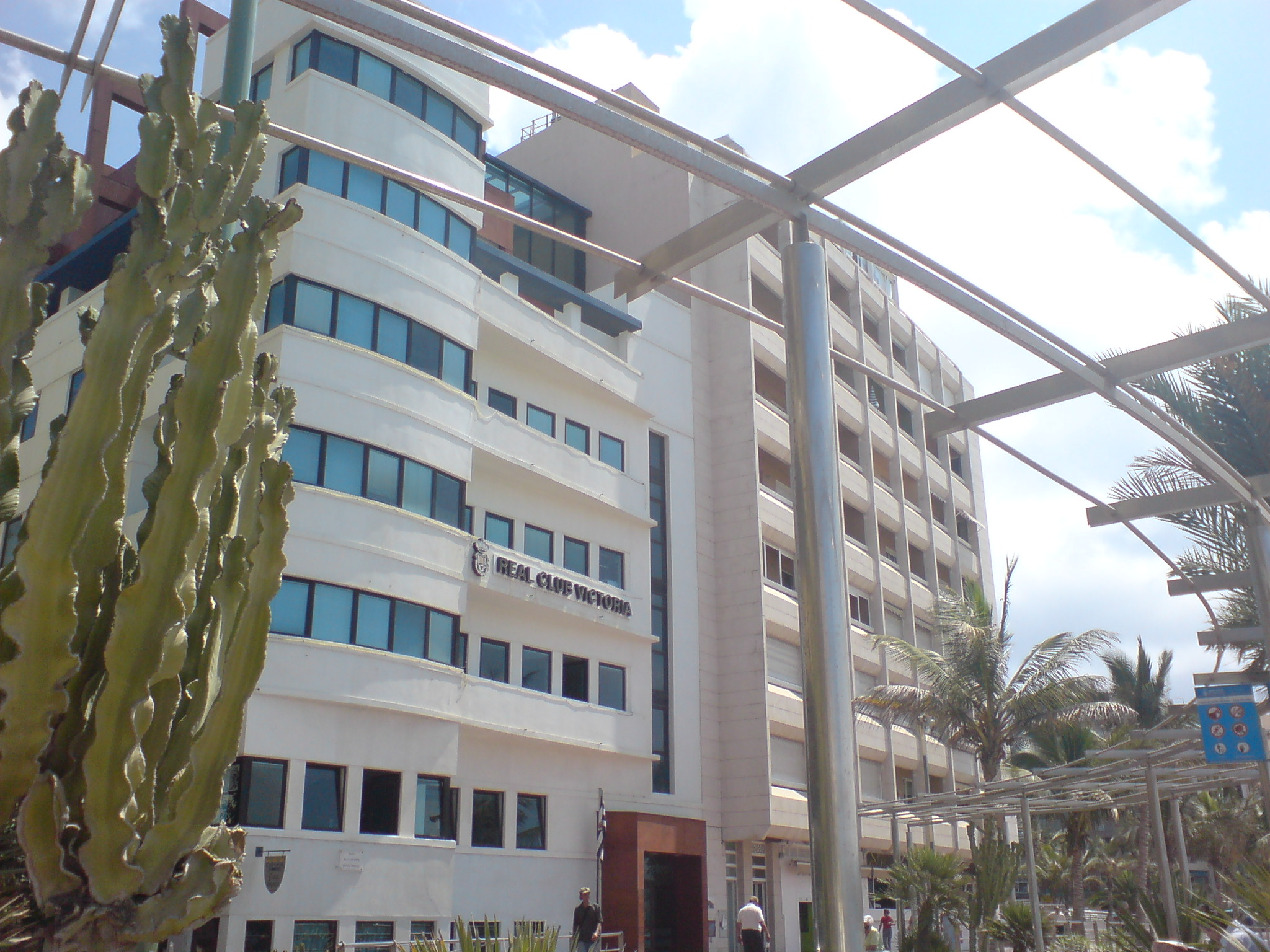
Real Club Victoria

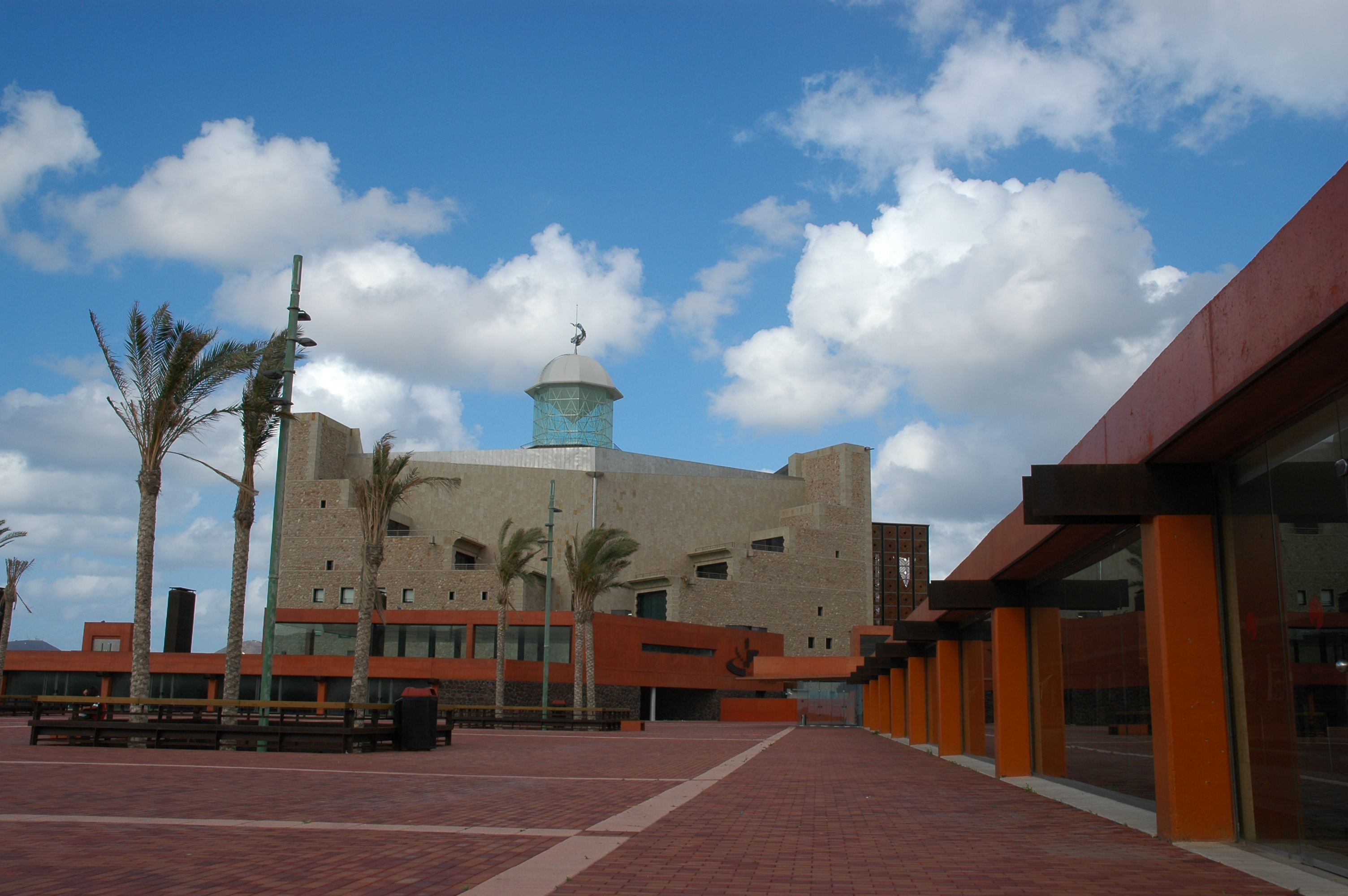
Plaza de la Música and Auditorium.

=== La Barra ===
Parallel to the shoreline of Playa de Las Canteras, approximately 200 metres offshore, lies a natural reef formation popularly known as La Barra. Extending for about two kilometres, it consists of sedimentary sandstone and calcareous deposits interspersed with conglomerates that are more than 100,000 years old. This formation acts as a natural barrier, reducing wave energy and limiting the loss of sand to offshore currents. La Barra is a defining geomorphological feature of the beach and contributes to its relatively calm bathing conditions. It also provides habitat for diverse marine species, supporting the area’s fish populations.

=== El Confital ===
Playa del Confital is located on the La Isleta peninsula and forms a natural continuation of Playa de Las Canteras. The section commonly used for bathing extends for approximately two kilometres, although the total coastal stretch is longer. The shoreline is predominantly rocky, with areas of coarse sand. The beach is noted for the clarity of its waters and for surf conditions that attract surfers and bodyboarders.

Until the early 21st century, part of the area was occupied by informal housing. This settlement was later removed, and the land was incorporated into the public coastal domain. In 2007, environmental restoration and improvement works were initiated to facilitate public access and recreational use.

=== Juguete del Viento ===
Juguete del Viento is a polychrome iron mobile sculpture located in the Plaza de La Puntilla. It was created in 1991 by the Lanzarote-born artist César Manrique, shortly before his death. The work forms part of a series of wind-activated sculptures installed in various locations in the Canary Islands.

=== Real Club Victoria ===
Real Club Victoria was founded in 1910 and has played a significant role in the social and sporting life of the city, particularly in the La Puntilla area. Its headquarters building, designed by the architect Marrero Regalado and constructed between the 1930s and 1940s, is noted for its architectural composition. In addition to its social facilities, the club operates a sailing school located beneath the Plaza de La Puntilla.

=== Mercado del Puerto ===
Mercado del Puerto is situated between Playa de Las Canteras and Puerto de La Luz. Covering approximately 1,700 square metres, it is considered a representative example of cast-iron architecture on Gran Canaria. The structure features a square, open-plan layout supported by cast-iron columns, with laminated or forged iron elements used in structural components such as the roof. Since 2012, the market has combined traditional commerce with a gastronomic offering, housing bars and food stalls that serve local seafood and a range of international products.

=== San José Clinic ===
The San José Clinic (Casa Asilo de San José) is one of the historic buildings associated with the beachfront area. Originally designed in 1896 by the architect Laureano Arroyo and later expanded in the 1920s by Rafael Masanet, the eclectic-style building includes a characteristic upper gallery added during its renovation. It was conceived as a charitable institution combining healthcare and social services, and it continues to function as a hospital.

=== Marrero Wall ===
The Marrero Wall is located along the Avenida de Las Canteras, in the Playa Chica sector, at the junction with Calle Doctor Grau Bassas and Calle Sargento Llagas. According to the Foundation for the Ethnography and the Development of Canary Crafts (FEDAC), an autonomous body of the Cabildo de Gran Canaria, the site commemorates Antonio Marrero Pérez, who in 1920 constructed a protective wall to shield his family home from wave action. The structure is regarded as a precursor to the later alignment of the seafront promenade and is marked by a commemorative plaque at the location.

The Paseo de Las Canteras functions as an open-air exhibition space featuring numerous sculptures of varied styles. Several works commemorate notable figures associated with the beach and the city. These include Calypso (1998), by Manuel González, dedicated to Jacques Cousteau; Homenaje a los pescadores fallecidos, by Chano Navarro Betancor, located in La Puntilla; and a bust of Pepe Gonçalves (1994) by Tony Gallardo, honouring the footballer and founder of Real Club Victoria. Other works include Los niños de la barra (1993), by Juan Bordes; busts of the poet Saulo Torón and Doctor Apolinario Macías; a life-size bronze statue of the folkloric singer Mary Sánchez (2005), by Ana Luisa Benítez; La mujer y su sombra, in corten steel, by César Manrique; El pescador (2002), by Chano Navarro; and Los nadadores. Homenaje a la travesía “Peña la Vieja” (2003), by Miguel Panadero.

=== Beach murals ===
Between December 1993 and April 1994, a series of murals with marine motifs were painted on several dividing walls along the beachfront in an effort to integrate modern construction with the coastal setting. The project divided the beach into two sections: from Playa Chica to La Puntilla, intervened by José Antonio García Álvarez and Fernando Álamo; and from Playa Chica to La Cícer, assigned to Manuel Padorno, who resided in the area.

=== Monument to Alfredo Kraus ===
A bronze monument to the tenor Alfredo Kraus stands approximately 80 metres from the Alfredo Kraus Auditorium, in the Jardines de los Puertos Atlánticos at the western end of the beach. The sculpture, created by Víctor Ochoa Sierra, was commissioned by the city to commemorate the anniversary of Kraus’s death and was inaugurated in February 2001. The monument consists of a cast-bronze figure assembled from overlapping plates and mounted on an internal steel structure. Including its base and foundation, the installation reaches a total height of approximately 23 metres. (Note: Originally the sculpture was to be located in a traffic circle in front of the main entrance to the Auditorium, but the site was discarded because the complex would be drowned by traffic, pedestrian access was not possible, the existing palm trees would be cut down and, in addition, the structure would be dissociated from the sea, thus breaking the concept devised by Ochoa. Ochoa Sierra (2001)) (Note: The pieces were mounted on the structure and the statue traveled in one piece by road from the artist's workshop in Arganda del Rey to the port of Tarragona, and from there it was shipped to Las Palmas de Gran Canaria, where it was installed on the base and a greenish patina was applied. Ochoa Sierra (2001))

=== Alfredo Kraus Auditorium and Conference Center of the Canary Islands ===
The Alfredo Kraus Auditorium and the adjoining Conference Center of the Canary Islands were designed by the architect Óscar Tusquets Blanca and inaugurated in 1997. Located at the western end of Playa de Las Canteras, the complex occupies approximately 13,200 square metres and contains eleven halls of varying capacity. The main Symphonic Hall seats 1,656 spectators and features a large window behind the stage overlooking the Atlantic Ocean.

=== Headquarters of the Philharmonic Orchestra of Gran Canaria and the Plaza de la Música ===
Behind the auditorium, in the Plaza de la Música area of El Rincón, stands the headquarters of the Orquesta Filarmónica de Gran Canaria. The facility serves as a rehearsal venue and operational base for the orchestra and complements the nearby congress facilities.

=== Monument to the Atlante ===
The Monument to the Atlante, created by Tony Gallardo and inaugurated in 1986 by King Juan Carlos and Queen Sofía of Spain, is situated on a promontory near the northern entrance to the city. Constructed from volcanic stone from La Isleta, the sculpture depicts a female figure with outstretched arms facing the Atlantic Ocean and symbolizes the island’s relationship with the sea.

=== Environmental management ===
Playa de Las Canteras operates under an environmental management system implemented in accordance with the UNE-EN ISO 14001:2004 standard and certified since 2004. The certification establishes guidelines intended to ensure that services and maintenance activities are carried out with consideration for environmental protection.

=== Blue Flags ===
The beach has received the European Blue Flag distinction on numerous occasions since 1989. The award recognizes compliance with criteria relating to water quality, environmental management, safety, and services. On 5 June 2007, Playa de Las Canteras officially raised the Blue Flag for that year.

=== Quality flag ===
Playa de Las Canteras has also been awarded the “Q for Tourism Quality” distinction by the Institute for Spanish Tourism Quality. The flag, displayed near the spa area on Calle Tomás Miller, certifies standards relating to service quality, safety, and professional management.

Diagram of sand entrainment dynamics at Playa de Las Canteras. Sand path in the past (left) and nowadays (right).

== Environmental problems ==
The alteration of natural sand dynamics is one of the principal environmental issues affecting Playa de Las Canteras. Historically, sand transported by marine currents was deposited on the western shore and subsequently carried by prevailing winds across the Isthmus of Guanarteme toward Playa de Las Alcaravaneras, forming an extensive dune field that reached as far as the Arenales district of Las Palmas de Gran Canaria. Urban development from the early 20th century onward—including the construction of the promenade and adjacent buildings—interrupted this aeolian transport, contributing to the progressive accumulation of sand on Las Canteras.

Concerns about sediment build-up date back to at least 1884, when the engineer Juan de León y Castillo submitted a report to El Museo Canario proposing possible solutions. In the 21st century, the greatest accumulation has been recorded at the northern end of the beach, between La Puntilla and the area near the Hotel Reina Isabel. Estimates indicate that several hundred cubic metres of sand may accumulate monthly in this sector. Over time, this process has altered seabed conditions and affected marine habitats. Proposals by the Spanish coastal authorities to dredge and redistribute sand have generated public debate, with opposition from some local residents and beach users.

=== Flora ===
The waters of Playa de Las Canteras host approximately 210 species of algae, representing around 30% of the macroscopic algal species catalogued in the Canary Islands. This diversity is linked to the particular ecological conditions created by the interaction between the beach and La Barra, which provides varied substrates and relative protection from strong wave action.

Among the species recorded is Bonnemaisonia hamifera, a red alga (phylum Rhodophyta) documented at Las Canteras and not widely reported elsewhere in the archipelago. The species exhibits two distinct morphological phases in its life cycle, one of which was only identified in the Canary Islands following its observation at this site.

Seagrass meadows of Cymodocea nodosa (commonly known as little Neptune grass) formerly covered a substantial proportion of the sandy seabed in the Bahía del Confital area, providing habitat for numerous marine organisms.[2] These meadows are protected under European environmental legislation, as the marine area of La Isleta and the Bahía del Confital have been designated a Site of Community Importance within the Natura 2000 Network. In recent decades, increased sediment accumulation has contributed to the burial and decline of some seagrass meadows, with associated impacts on marine fauna. Currently, hard substrates in parts of the beach are colonized by species such as the articulated green alga Cymopolia barbata. Other conspicuous algae present include the brown algae Lobophora variegata and Padina pavonica, as well as the red alga Asparagopsis taxiformis.

=== Fauna ===
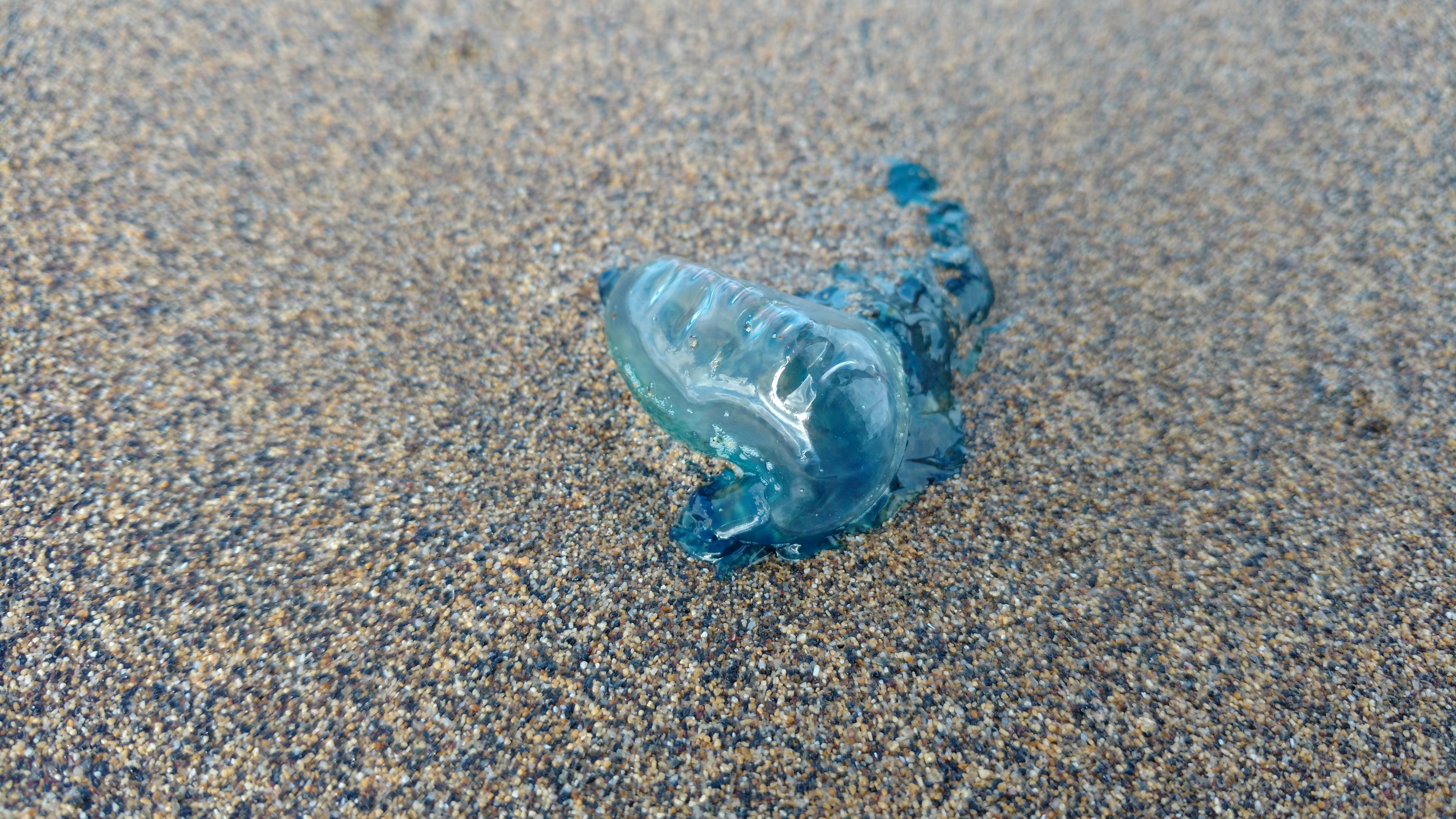
Portuguese man o' war in Las Cícer area

The fauna of Playa de Las Canteras is closely linked to the protective role of La Barra, which shelters much of the beach from strong Atlantic currents. The waters support a variety of pelagic fish species, including sargo, Trachinotus ovatus, parrotfish, ornate wrasse, salemas, canary damsel, and Mauligobius maderensis. Benthic species inhabit the rocky substrates, such as limpets (genus Patella) and wide-eyed flounder (Bothus podas).

Tidal pools formed at low tide host diverse invertebrates, including crabs, brittle stars, hermit crabs, sea urchins, starfish, sponges, and ascidians. Small clams, shrimps, corals, sea slugs, octopuses, and cuttlefish are also found in these habitats. Historically, seagrass meadows supported species such as the long-snouted seahorse (Hippocampus ramulosus), but these populations have declined since the 1980s due to habitat loss. Similarly, the leopard eel (Myrichthys pardalis), a colorful, scaleless fish, has experienced population decreases and is considered one of the most emblematic species of the beach ecosystem.

==== Birds ====
While Playa de Las Canteras is not a significant nesting site, it provides perching and feeding opportunities for many birds. Seagulls are common, and species such as the Eurasian whimbrel, ruddy turnstone and little egret are often observed foraging in tidal pools or along rocky areas. Historically, before the urbanization of the isthmus, the area supported a notable colony of Eurasian stone-curlews (alcaravaneras), which lent their name to the adjacent Playa de Las Alcaravaneras.

==== Cetaceans ====
The waters surrounding La Isleta and Bahía del Confital, despite heavy maritime traffic from the nearby Puerto de La Luz, serve as both habitat and migratory corridor for cetaceans and other marine mammals. Occasional strandings have occurred, but some individuals have been observed entering the protected waters near the beach, interacting with bathers. For example, in 1983, a group of Risso's dolphins spent an entire day within the dock area.

One mile northeast of La Isleta, research by the University of Las Palmas de Gran Canaria has documented a resident group of common bottlenose dolphins coexisting with a group of Risso's dolphins, as well as a population of sperm whales that use the channel between Gran Canaria and Fuerteventura. This marine ecosystem has been designated a Site of Community Importance and is included in the European Union’s Natura 2000 Network.

== Surfing in Las Canteras ==
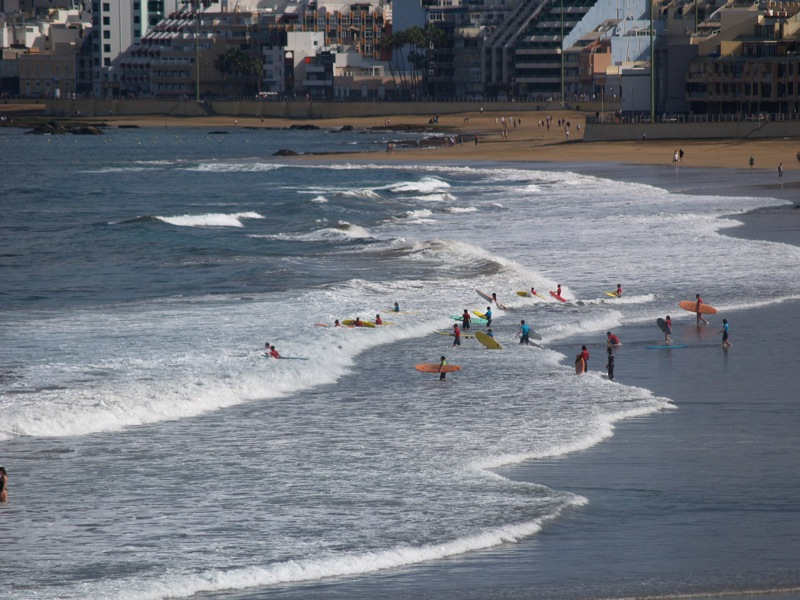
Surfers in La Cícer.

The waves at Playa de Las Canteras are primarily generated by swells originating as far away as the Canadian coast, the English Channel, or the western Sahara. When strong winds blow over the open ocean for several days, they create short, chaotic waves. During their long journey across the Atlantic, some of these waves organize into long, orderly swells that reach the Canary Islands, providing ideal conditions for surfing.

=== La Cícer, birthplace of surfing ===
La Cícer, formerly known by its original toponym Punta Brava, was the first place that welcomed the pioneers of surfing, when its practice was introduced in Gran Canaria by foreigners and peninsulars in 1970. It was a marginal area, with urban police officers and signs prohibiting bathing due to the danger of the currents, which was popularly outside the Playa de Las Canteras. In fact, in those years it was physically separated from the rest of the beach by the installations of the power plant of the Compañía Insular Colonial Electricidad y Riegos (CICER) that interrupted the continuity of the promenade in that area. The power plant, when it was installed in 1928, did so in a 16,000m² open space far from the city; decades later, as the area was urbanized, it was right on the beachfront, which was used by technicians in the 1960s to build a canal and levee, which still exists, to take and relieve the water that was used to cool the turbines of the power plant. Over the years, this dike caused an increase in sand in the area and the progressive burial of the stones and volcanic sand that made up that part of the beach. For some decades now, the CICER power plant (which has come under the control of Unelco-Endesa) has been paralyzed and partly dismantled, coming into service on rare occasions. On its site, the city council has planned the construction of social and sports facilities and a public square. However, the memory of the CICER power plant lives on in the collective imagination, which has ended up giving its name to this part of the beach.

Characteristics of the spots in Las Canteras area:

1. El Lloret
  1. Left and right of El Lloret (Fish Factory), pebbles bottoms
  2. Predominantly low tide and winds from south and southeast
  3. All levels. Waves from 1 to more than 4 meters.
1. Las Canteras
  1. La Puntilla, volcanic bottom; La Barra, volcanic bottom (several peaks); La Cícer, sandy bottom.
  2. Predominantly high tide and winds from south and southeast.
  3. All levels. Waves between 1 and 3 meters (up to 1.5 m in La Puntilla).
1. El Confital
  1. Las Monjas, La Punta and the right side of El Confital.
  2. Predominance of medium and high tides and southeast winds; volcanic bottom.
  3. Expert level. Waves between 1.5 and more than 3 meters.

== Diving in Las Canteras ==
The Playa de Las Canteras has two areas enabled for diving, one in the Playa Chica and the other, more extensive, in the Playa Grande. Because they are located within the inner coastal area of the dock (between the shore and La Barra), the maximum depth that can be reached at low tide is 5 meters, with an average depth of about 2 meters. These dives are of little difficulty and with occasional currents (more frequent in the area of Playa Chica), suitable for children and young people, in which the use of sophisticated equipment is not necessary. Professionals and experienced amateurs can try the outside of La Barra and Baja Fernando on days when the currents and tide allow it, or dive in the nearby Roque Matavinos, in the area of La Puntilla, a large volcanic rock formation with a very rugged bottom full of caves and tunnels where various species of penumbra fauna take refuge and where depths of about fifteen meters are reached.

== Panoramic views ==
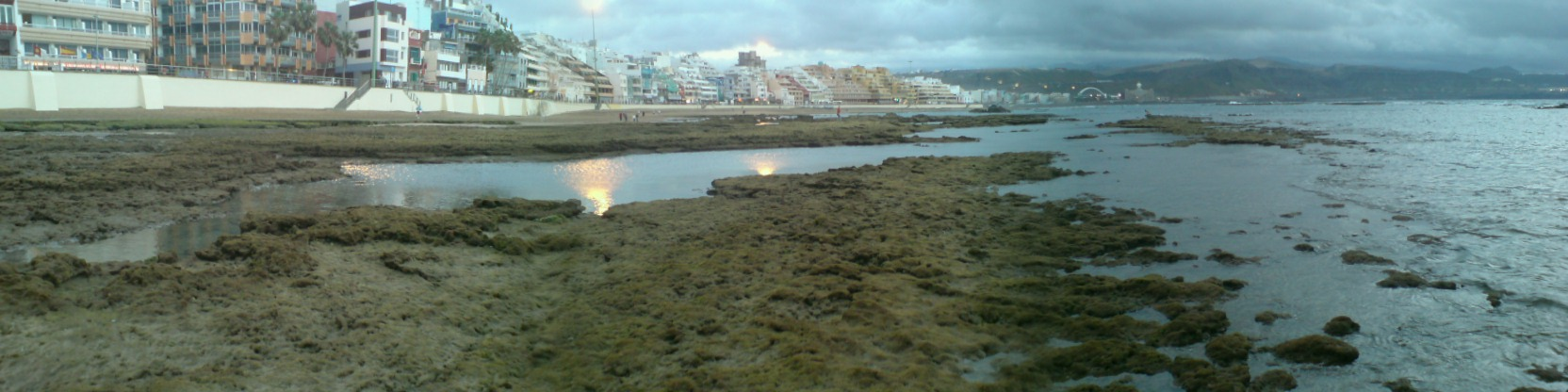
Sunset on the beach from the area known as Los Lisos, a rocky reef that is exposed during low tide forming small lagoons and pools inside, where most of the beach fauna, mainly crabs (warty crab Eriphia verrucosa or tidal spray crab Plagusia depressa) and sea urchins (Paracentrotus lividus) have their shelter.

== See also ==
- Las Palmas de Gran Canaria

== Bibliography ==
- Alonso Bilbao, Ignacio (1993). Procesos sedimentarios en la playa de Las Canteras (Gran Canaria) [Tesis Doctoral] (Thesis) (in Spanish). Las Palmas de Gran Canaria : Universidad de Las Palmas de Gran Canaria.
- Apolinario Navarro, Juan Francisco (1986). Breve historial de la fundación benéfica Casa-asilo San José (in Spanish). Las Palmas de Gran Canaria: Caja Insular de Ahorros de Canarias.
- Barrera Artiles, José (1995). Las Canteras (1900–2000) (in Spanish). Las Palmas de Gran Canaria : Ayuntamiento de Las Palmas de Gran Canaria, Concejalía de Playas. ISBN 84-88979-13-4.
- González Jiménez, José F. (1998). Peces de Canarias : guía submarina (in Spanish). La Laguna: Francisco Lemus Editor. ISBN 84-87973-06-X.
- González Barbuzano, José Ramón; et al. (André Michel, Bello Cárdenes Ildefonso, Bello Naranjo Francisco, Benítez Cabrera Vicente, Briz Miquel Oreto, Carrillo Molina José, Castillo Eguia Ricardo, Del Villar Martínez Enrique, Folkens Pieter, García Campos Miguel Ángel, García Navarro Milagrosa, González Barbuzano José Ramón, González Henríquez Nieves, González Hernández Luis, González Navarro José, Hansen Machín A., Lobo Cabrera Manuel, Montesdeoca Sánchez Ignacio, Naranjo Cigala Agustín, Pavón Salas Ninoska, Portillo Hahnefeld Agustín, Salas Pascual Marcos, Torrado F. J., Vega Ruiz Raquel) (2003). Las Canteras y Bahía de El Confital : libro blanco (in Spanish). Las Palmas de Gran Canaria : Cabildo de Gran Canaria, Consejería de Obras Públicas e Infraestructuras.
- Hansen Machín, Alex (1987). Los volcanes recientes de Gran Canaria (in Spanish). Gran Canaria: Ediciones del Cabildo Insular de Gran Canaria. ISBN 84-7207-047-6.
- Hernández Socorro, María de los Reyes (2006). Bienes muebles del Ayuntamiento de Las Palmas de Gran Canaria : un patrimonio por descubrir : [exposición] Edificio Miller, del 21 de junio al 23 de julio 2006, Las Palmas de Gran Canaria / [comisaria y textos, María de los Reyes Hernández Socorro] (in Spanish). Ayuntamiento de Las Palmas de Gran Canaria: Las Palmas de Gran Canaria. ISBN 84-88979-78-9.
- Herrera Piqué, Alfredo (1984). Las Palmas de Gran Canaria (in Spanish). Alcorcón: Editorial Rueda, S.L. ISBN 84-7207-041-7.
- Ochoa Sierra, Víctor (2001). Kraus : memoria de un monumento (in Spanish). Ayuntamiento de Las Palmas de Gran Canaria: Las Palmas de Gran Canaria. ISBN 84-88979-45-2.
- Placeres, Francisco; León, Mandy (1999). Guía para la práctica del surf en Gran Canaria : spots, fotos, mapas, historia (in Spanish). Las Palmas de Gran Canaria : Cabildo de Gran Canaria, Área de Cooperación Institucional.
- Hoja y memoria del mapa geológico de España E. 1:25.000 : n 1.101 I y II (Las Palmas de Gran Canaria) (in Spanish). Madrid: Instituto Geológico y Minero de España. IGME. 1990.
