= Miró otro =

1969 art exhibition in Barcelona, Spain

Miró otro, originally spelled backwards as Orim, was a retrospective of the Catalan painter Joan Miró's work organized by Official College of Architects of Catalonia (COAC) at its headquarters in Barcelona during April–June 1969. One of the most important and transgressors of this exhibit was the art intervention made by the artist and collaborators before the opening of the exhibition, and destroyed by him and collaborators later.

== Exhibition ==
The exhibition took place from 30 April to 30 June 1969 in Barcelona. It was originally scheduled to end on 30 May, but it was extended for a month.

The COAC commissioned the architectural firm Studio PER (Pep Bonet Cristian Cirici, Lluís Clotet and Oscar Tusquets) to do the script and prepare the exhibition. According to Cristian Cirici, the exhibit would serve as a counterpart to the official exhibition organized by Francoist Spain shortly before at the Hospital de la Santa Creu, in at the Raval zone in Barcelona (1968). That marked the turning point when the artist happens to be marginalized In Spain to be officially accepted, assimilated and trivialized by it.

[...] The partners from Studio PER[...], we had just 27 years and received a statement from the College of Architects of Catalonia and the Balearic Islands, commissioned to write the script and the start an exhibit -one that we called Orim (Miró written from right to left) - in the retrospective exhibition organized by the City Council as part of the old Gothic Hospital de la Santa Cruz.

— Cristian Cirici,

The exhibition was a clearly provocative and transgressive. Pere Portabella rebellious explains the nature of the exhibition:

It wanted to give an overview of Miró's work before, during and after the war (1936-39). To report the manipulation made by the regime during the Year, Miró declared by the Ministry of Information and Tourism in 1969 (murals everywhere, they wanted to appoint him as a member of the Academy ...

— Pere Portabella,

== Action ==
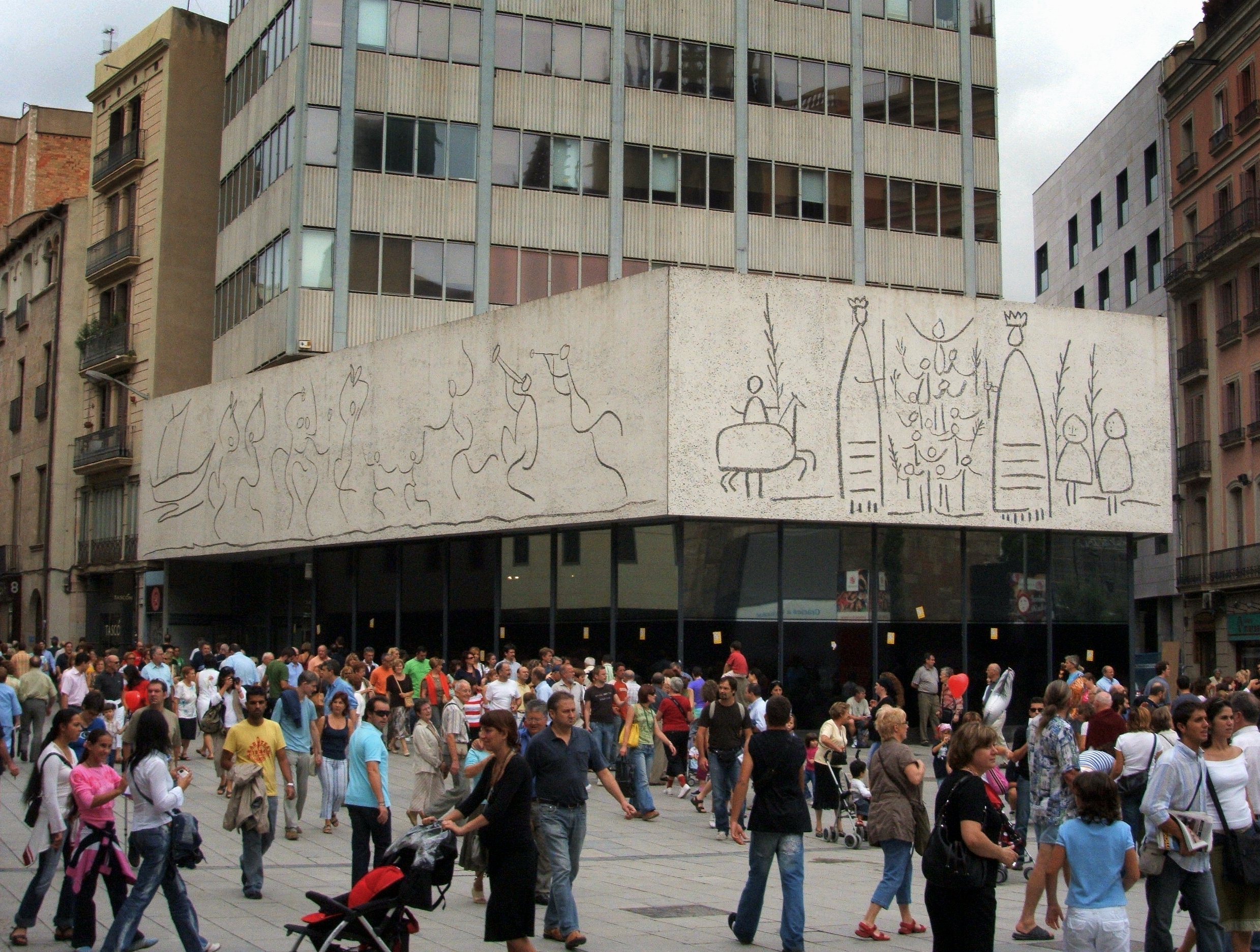
COAC headquarters, where the action took place

The curators of the exhibition, members of Studio PER, asked Joan Miró to do an art intervention for the exhibition at the headquarters of COAC, and he turned with enthusiasm, starting with the idea of painting a mural over all the windows of the ground floor of COAC Barcelona. The action was an ephemeral piece of art collective, and a demystification of the artist, in the spirit of Arte Povera, ephemeral arts. Miró chose four people to work with him, he gave them each a colour (yellow, green, blue and Red) and he gave them free rein to paint whatever they wanted. He reserved the black colour, which he applied with a stick as final intervention, retouching what the others had done only minutes before.

The action began at 4 a.m. on 27 April 1969, with the previous involvement of the four partners (plus a filmmaker, photographer, etc.). It ended with the intervention of Miró on the morning of April 28, ending around 6 am, with Miró putting the final touches of black. 21 windows were painted which were each just over two meters (6 1/2 ft) long. The length covered was about 44 m (144 ft) long, and the area covered was about 70 square metres (750 sq ft).

The act of destruction of the work took place on 30 June 1969, coinciding with the closing of the exhibition. It began at 12 noon, when it was blotted with solvent using a broom. Some of the spectators, including the architect Oscar Tusquets Blanca, the hatter and promoter of art, Joan Prats Vallès, some students of architecture and some art critics soon began to help.

The work was ephemeral because after the exhibition, the artist, possibly at the instigation of the director Pere Portabella, with the cooperation of the people present at the event and a cleaning woman used solvent to wipe out the image as an act of counterculture.

Of all the project, there is no doubt that the most provocative was the part that disappeared: College crystals painted by Miró, Picasso under the frieze and facing the cathedral. [...] Provocative work, collectively, ephemeral ... It was the moment you start talking about conceptual art. Miró Perhaps unwittingly stepped forward.

— Fundación Miró (Rosa Maria Malet? Teresa Muntaner? Emilio Fernandez Miró? Pere Portabella?)

Pere Portabella was asked to record the event. From it is his work Miró, l'altre (15 min., Mexico, 1969, with music by Carlos Santos and without speech), which includes the process of painting such as the destruction of the work. The action was also determined by renowned photographers Colita (black and white) and Francesc Català Roca (in color).

Miró talked about this work:

Some people cried a little because these works could provide incomes. But it had to be like this. The young architects wanted to make a presentation of shock, attack, otherwise the official retrospective exhibition had done before, the painter of the museums. I did not go to the official opening of the exhibition. I was in Barcelona, but at the last moment I announced that I would not go for not being here with the authorities. But I was here for young architects, and at three in the morning, when there was no one, it wasn't a sidewalk show, I was painting on the street. Then we went for a coffee and a croissant to warm up a bit. What interested me was the instant gesture prepared on the merits, which were inscriptions in Catalan in favor of freedom of Catalonia.

— Joan Miró,

== Reaction ==
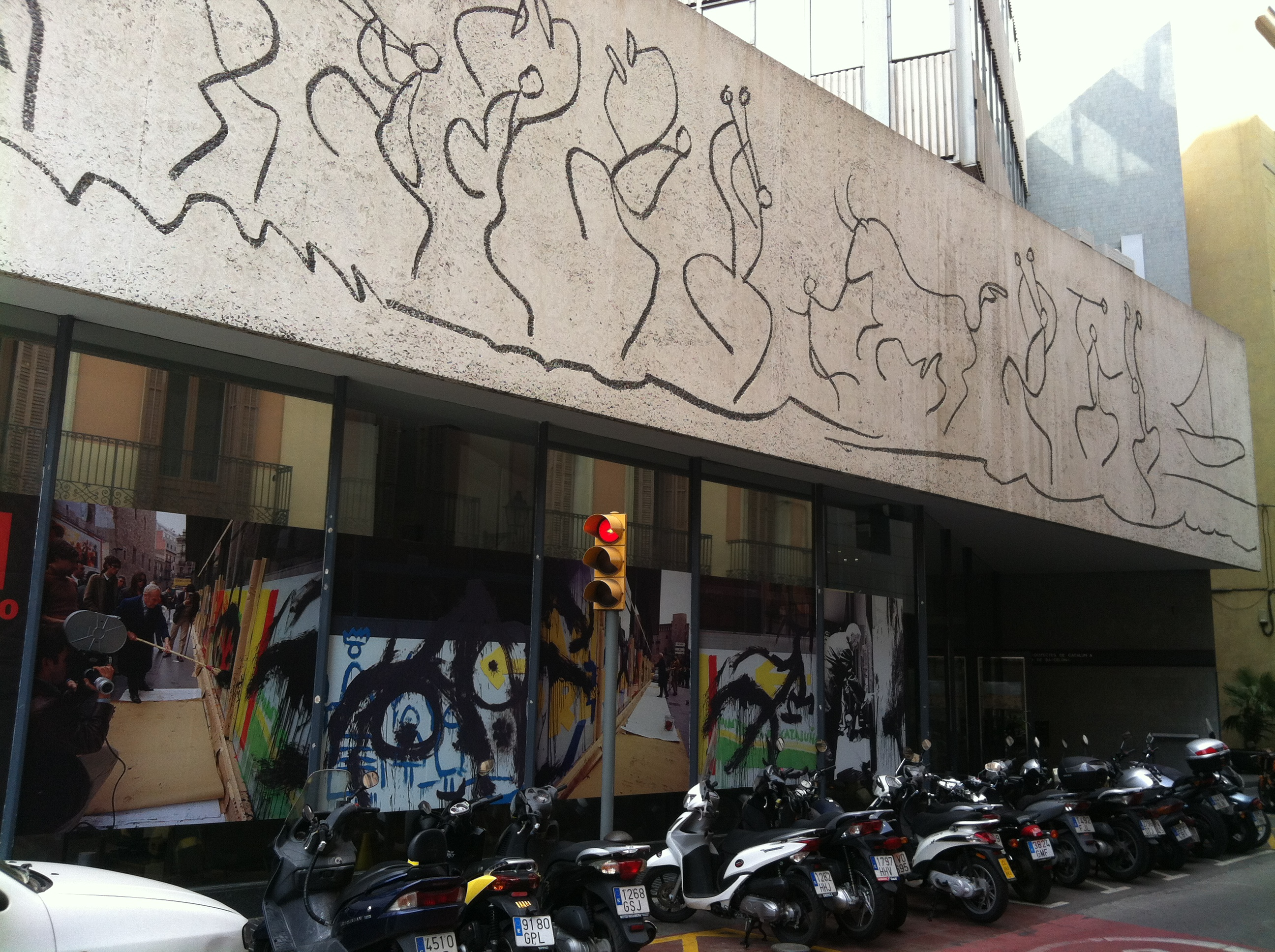
In 2012 there was a memorial exhibit where the paintings were displayed again.

The art intervention made by Miró and his colleagues caused many reactions, including strong words of rejection by the art critic Rafael Santos Torroella:

Evil is, however, how naive have fallen into a double play in all-before, in contrast, can foster. Because what the graffiti of crystals, based on broom and trays or bowls of paint hostesses on a simulation silly ironic Picasso drawings so far, this, alas, of such childish, ridiculous show has too much of Dalí - as contrast, during a lifetime, the spirit of looked-for to be taken seriously.

— Rafael Santos Torroella,

On the day of the destruction of the work, the critic José María Moreno Galván, tried to dissuade the painter of an act that he thought wrong. Miró was in COAC Culture Committee in the company of poet and critic José Corredor-Matheos and told him that I had thought long and that was fine destruction, although he understood the plight of the critic. Moreno Galván is opposed to destruction in an article in the magazine Triunfo:

The spectacle of Joan Miró destroying the artwork that he created with his own hands, I would not like to see it anymore ... I had a brief emotional chill. I turned back and went into the building. It was not ok. I protest.

— José María Moreno Galván,

Other people who spoke in the negative against the work or destruction were the poet Federico García-Durán de Lara, among others.

There were also positive reviews. The writer and art critic Alexandre Cirici, for example, praised the action as "radical":

For many visitors have been a surprise the appearance of a militant Miro on historical moments. For many people, the impact has been happening, both environment and participation of large mural prepared team, where the graphics of the four authors of the exhibition architects went into the final composition made by Miró with a soaked black broom. A work that defies good manners, financial speculation, the idea of the legendary artist as a priest, and that is an image of street violence. It is a radical break with the established value system.

— Alexandre Cirici, Minguet

Other proponents of the act of destruction that were delivered at the time, included: Llorens Artigas, Joan Perucho, Oscar Tusquets and Miquel Gaspar.

Years later, the art critic and curator, now director of the Fundación Miró, Rosa Maria Malet, and the poet, art critic and friend of Miró, Jacques Dupin, praised the action in his works.

== Testimony ==
Pere Portabella recorded the action and then edited, publishing Miró, l’altre, 1969 a 15-minute video recorded in color and free speech. Manuel Esteban was in charge of photography, and music was provided by Carles Santos. The assembly was made by Teresa Alcocer. The film was co-produced by the same association of architects, along with Films 59 by Jose Pedro Villanueva. The film has been seen as evidence of the action on several commemorative exhibitions Miró, Miró as Joan Miró. 1956-1983. Feeling, emotion, gesture, held in the Joan Miró Foundation between November 24, 2006 and February 25, 2007.

The photographer Colita also documented the action, making a series of black-and-white photographs and others in color. It also could be seen in the same retrospective of 2006. Francesc Català Roca also made a small series of photographs.
