= Auditorio Alfredo Kraus =

Auditorium in Las Palmas, Gran Canaria, Spain

Coordinates: 28°07′48″N 15°26′57″E

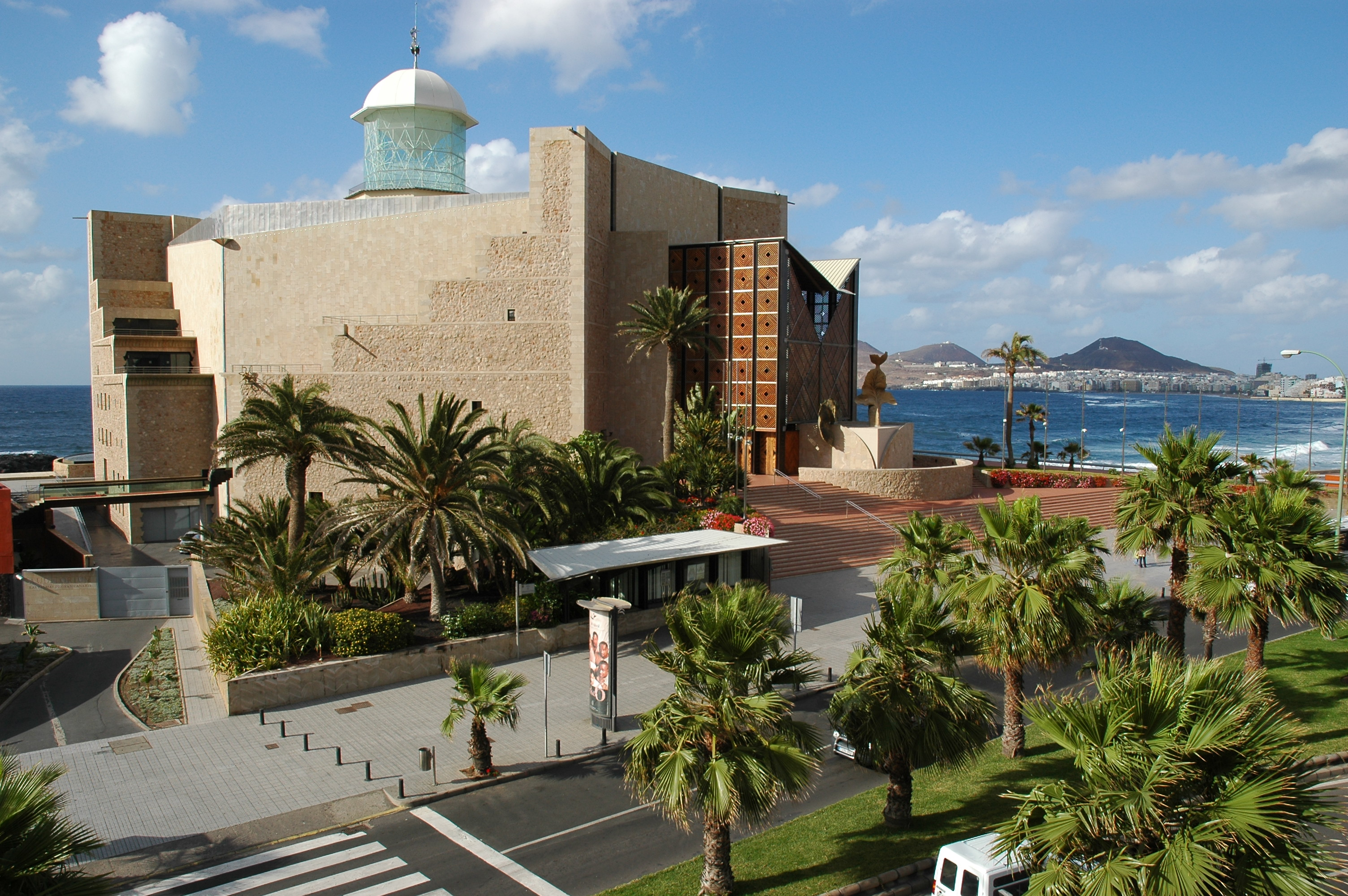
Auditorio alfredo kraus las palmas de gran canaria

The Auditorio Alfredo Kraus (Alfredo Kraus Auditorium) is an auditorium in Spain located in Las Palmas de Gran Canaria and is one of the most unique buildings in the capital of Gran Canaria. Created by Óscar Tusquets, it was built between 1993 and 1997 with the idea of erecting a lighthouse to protect Las Canteras beach. It was opened on 5 December 1997. The Auditorium bears the name of Alfredo Kraus in homage and gratitude to the work of the tenor from Gran Canaria. In its main hall, behind the orchestra, there is an enormous window of around 100 m2 that allows a view of the Atlantic Ocean while attending a concert.

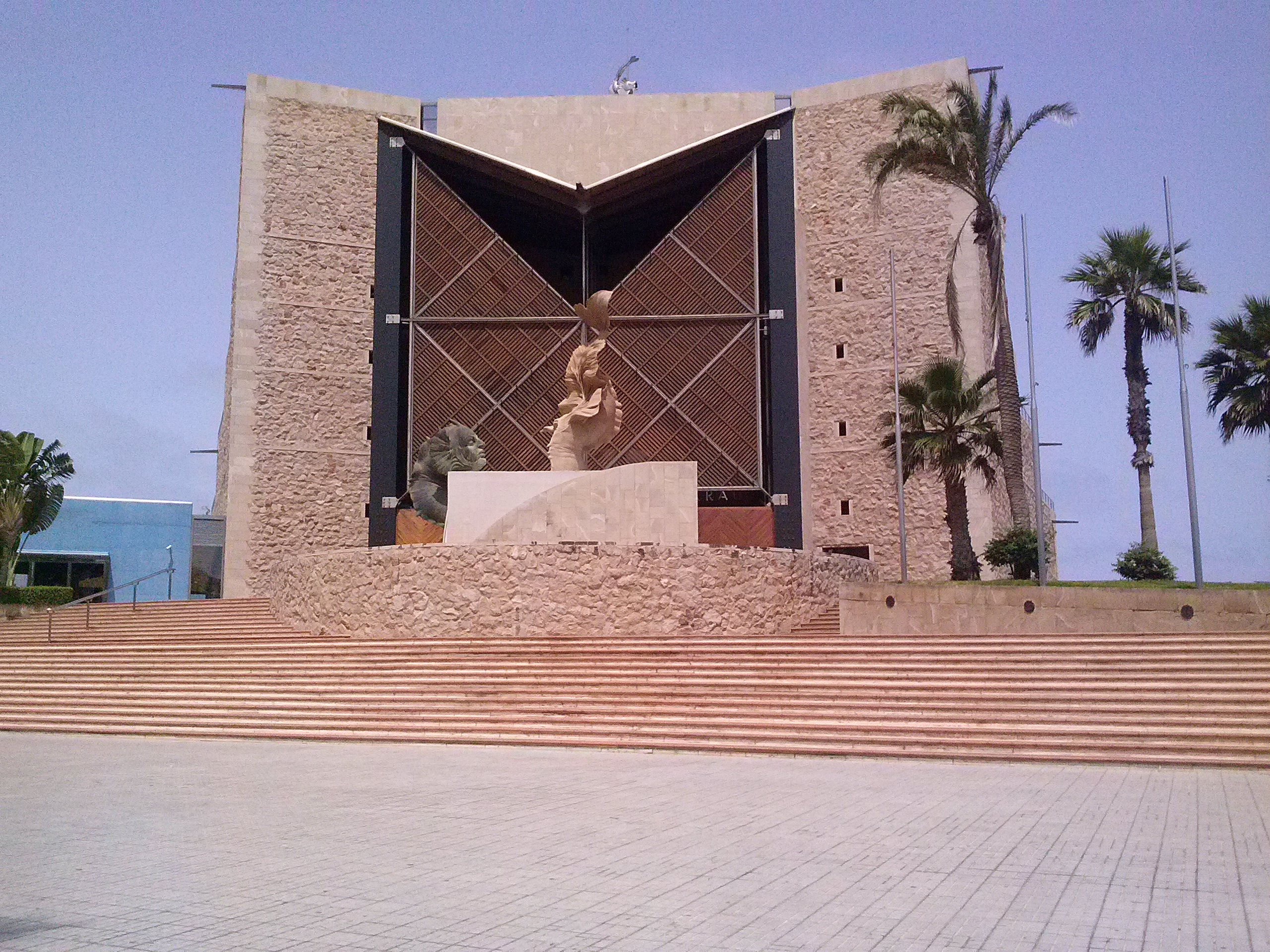
Alfredo Krauss frontal

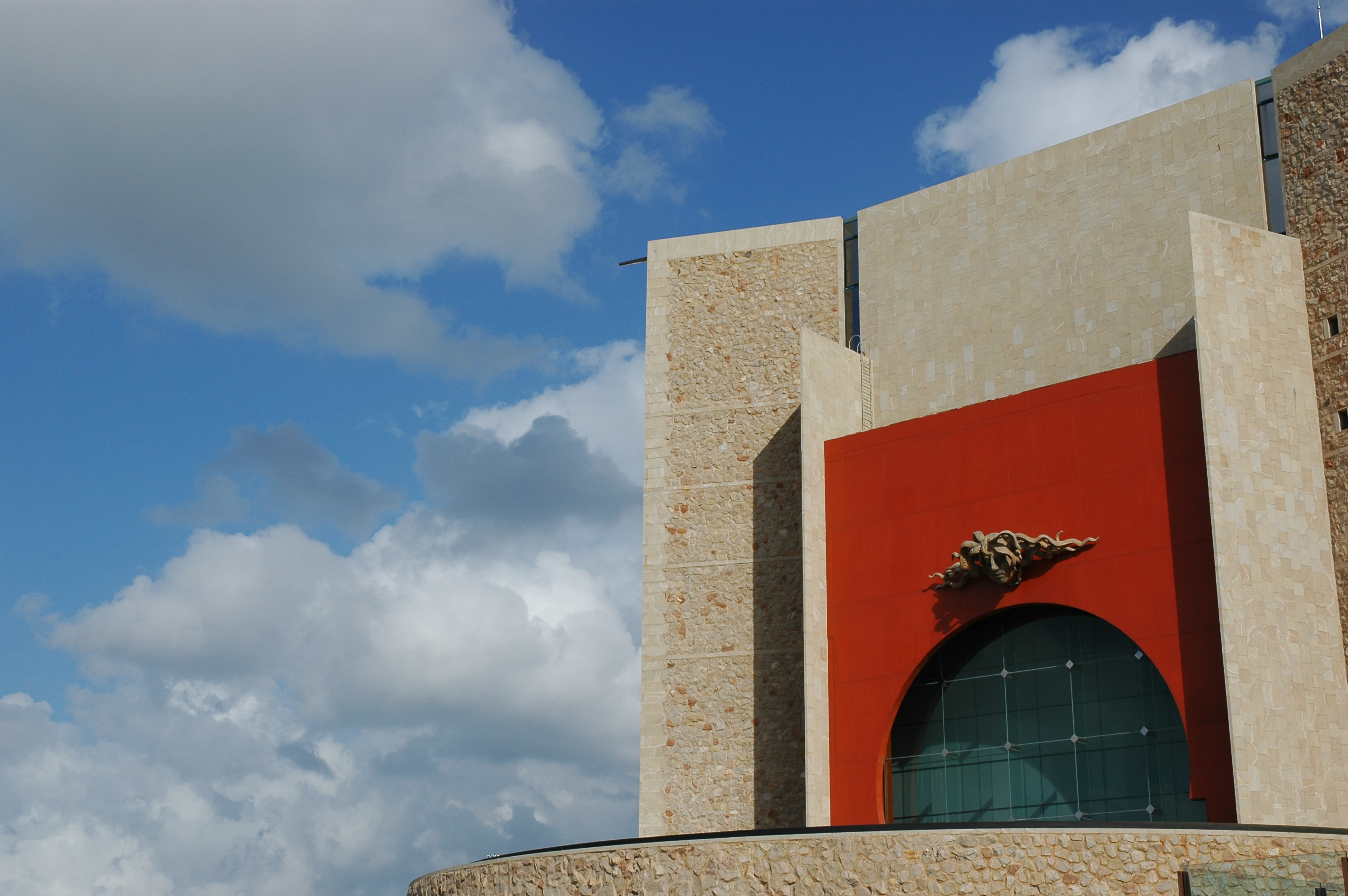
Medusa Sculpture

The Alfredo Kraus Auditorium hosts the annual Las Palmas de Gran Canaria International Film Festival and the Canary Islands Music Festival, among other festivals, as well as promoting competitions, exhibitions, congresses and conventions. It is the headquarter of the Philharmonic Orchestra of Gran Canaria.

In the auditorium complex is also the Palacio de Congresos de Canarias located.

== Symphony Hall ==
The Symphony Hall has a capacity to accommodate 1,656 people. Measuring 1,650 m^{2} , its hexagonal shape was designed for extraordinary acoustics.

In the Hall, apart from the enormous window that opens between the stalls and the sea, there is a spectacular organ which, with its 2,750 pipes, is one of the largest in the Canary Islands and the only secular organ on the island of Gran Canaria.

The organ was inaugurated on 21 October 1999 with a concert in the presence of Princess Irene of Greece. The recital, given by organist Wolfgang Seifen, was in aid of the Fundación Mundo en Armonía.

In November 2002 the Auditorium was extended with two new halls: San Borondón and Alegranza. Eight years later, on 3 November 2010, the range of venues was completed with the inauguration of a multi-purpose hall, also designed by Óscar Tusquets, which incorporates a mechanism for collecting the seats and thus accommodating all kinds of events.
