= Port of Arinaga =

Seaport

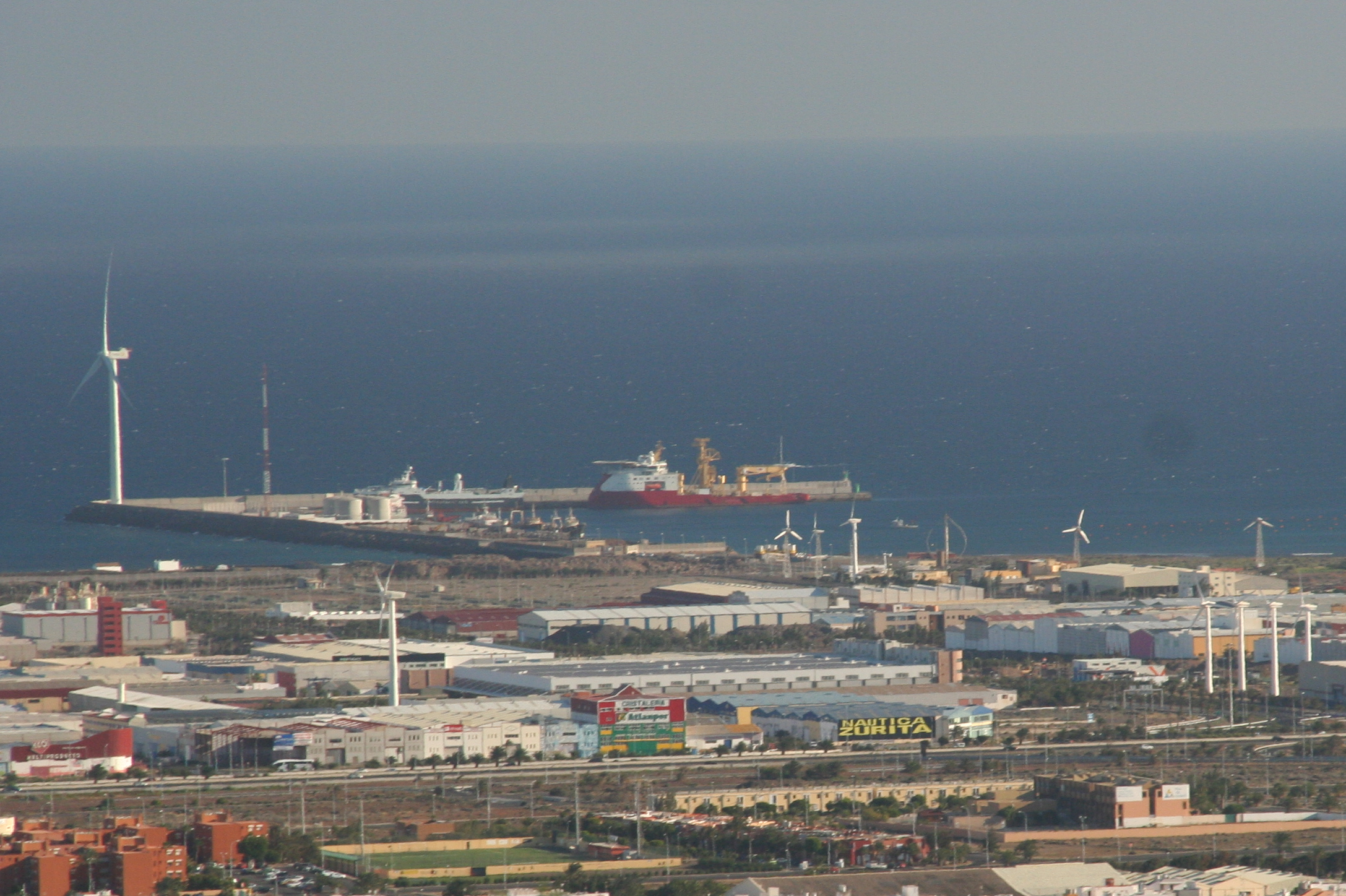
- Click on the map for a fullscreen view

Location
- Country: Spain
- Location: Agüimes, Gran Canaria
- Coordinates: 27°50′44″N 15°23′53″W
- UN/LOCODE: ES RGA

Details
- Operated by: Port Authority of Las Palmas

Statistics
- Annual cargo tonnage: 154,000 (2016)

The port of Arinaga is a small seaport off the eastern coast of the Spanish island of Gran Canaria, in the Canary Islands, themselves located in the Mid-Atlantic.

It was not until the later part of the 19th century when the construction of a small harbor in order to facilitate the agricultural exports of the southern part of the island was proposed. Works initiated following the 1917 crisis during World War I and, in 1927, an expansion was commissioned, although it would not take place at the time. Later in the 20th century a mammoth project that would make the port bigger than Las Palmas' was ultimately shelved in the 1970s.

An offshore wind turbine was installed in the harbor, and, in 2013, it broke the national record in Spain for electric production in a single generator, reaching 118,05 MWh.

It is operated by the Port Authority of Las Palmas. As of 2020, its activity focuses on the handling of solid bulk.
