= Port of Las Palmas =

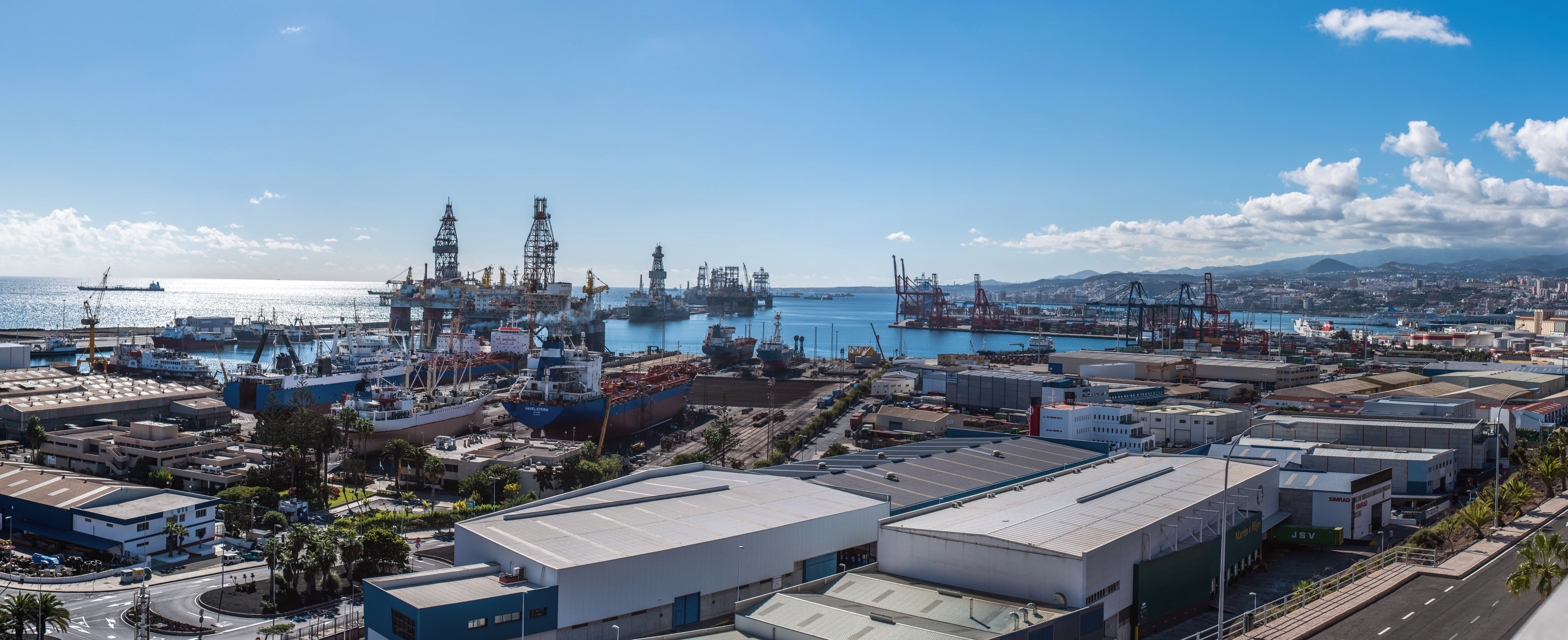
- Interactive map of Port of Las Palmas

Location
- Country: Spain
- Location: Gran Canaria
- Coordinates: 28°9′N 15°25′W
- UN/LOCODE: ESLPA

Details
- Operated by: Port Authority of Las Palmas
- Type of Harbor: Coastal breakwater

Statistics
- Annual cargo tonnage: 20,808,581 (2018)
- Annual container volume: 1,034,642 TEUs (2018)
- Passenger traffic: 1,208,205 (2018)
- Notes: Statistics together with those of the satellite Port of Arinaga
- Website http://www.palmasport.es

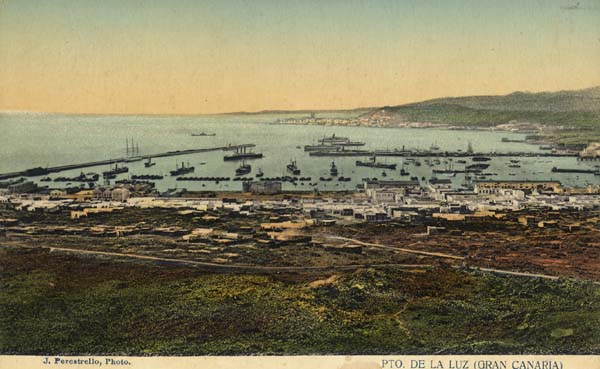
Las Palmas Port in 1912

Port of Las Palmas (also called La Luz Port; Spanish: Puerto de Las Palmas or Puerto de La Luz) is port for fishing, commercial, passenger and sports boats in the city of Las Palmas in the north-east of Gran Canaria, Canary Islands, Spain. For five centuries, the Port of Las Palmas has been the traditional base for scale and supplying ships on their way through the Middle Atlantic.

== Operations ==
La Luz Port it is not only one of the first ports of the Canary Islands, but also one of the first ports in the Mid-Atlantic, and handles for some of the traffic at the crossroads between Europe, Africa and America. In turn, it constitutes one of the main ports of Spain and the first of the geographical area of West Africa. The port in 2007 handled a total of 907,782 passengers, 16.26% more than in 2006, and the growing cruise passenger traffic rose 21.23%. In 2007, it processed some 11,262 ships. In 2011 the port was the fourth busiest container port in Spain, handling 1,287,389 TEUs.

== Freight ==
The port has an annual traffic of more than 4,500 weighing stations, and handles 400,000 tonnes of frozen fish per year. The port provides 175,000 cubic meters of cold storage facilities, and storage areas for special refrigerated containers and preparation rooms for frozen products. These facilities have a variety of refrigeration which can carry out all activities necessary for postprocessing of fish, from refrigeration and storage of the product at low temperatures for subsequent distribution, to manufacture and supply of industrial ice. The port's facilities include a border inspection post (BIP) approved by the European Union, which is responsible for inspecting all types of imports from third countries or exports to countries outside the European Economic Area.

== Ferries ==
A weekly ferry route operates from Las Palmas to Cádiz on the Spanish mainland. The crossing, operated by Trasmediterránea, takes around 40 hours.

== Gallery ==
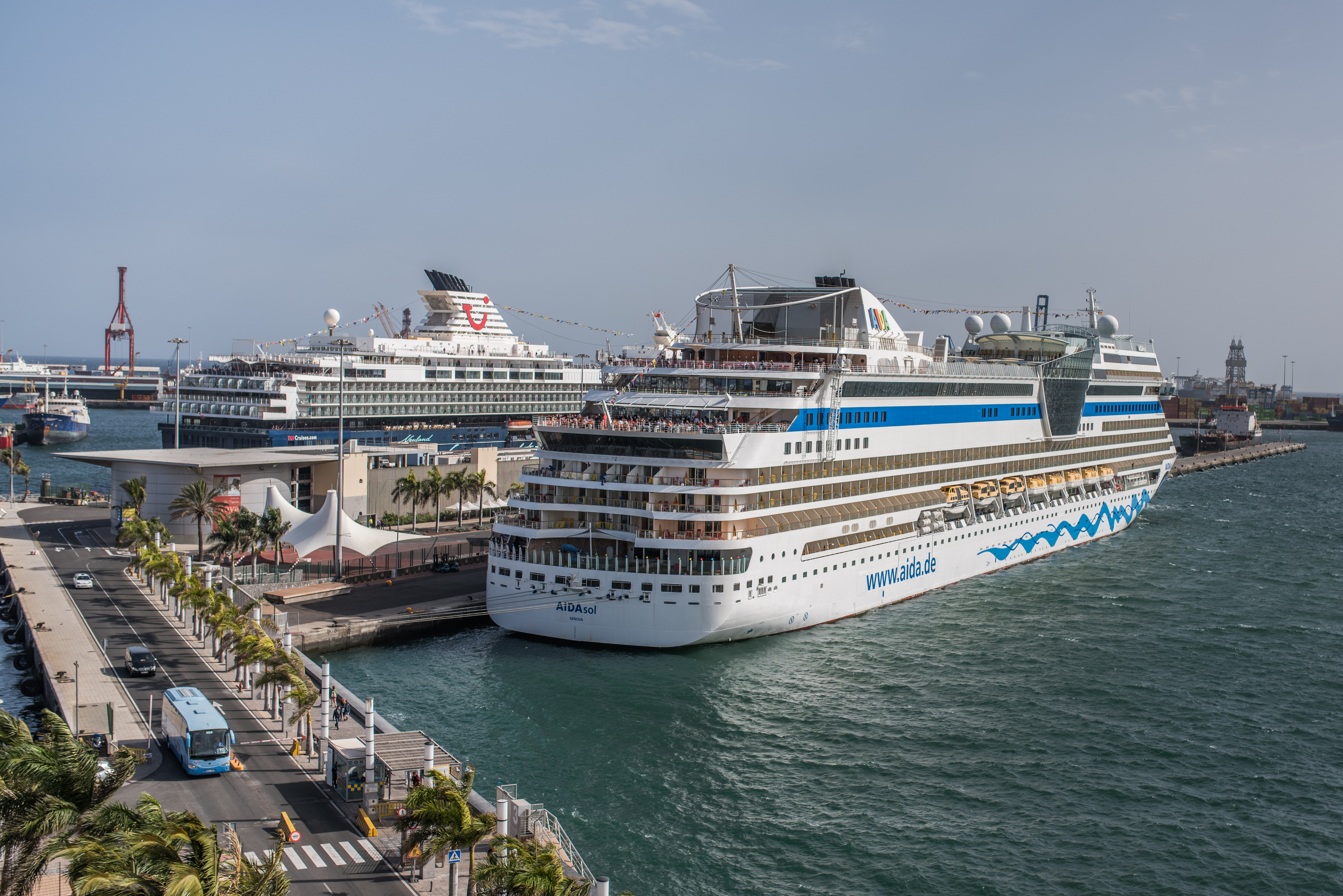
Puerto de Las Palmas 2017

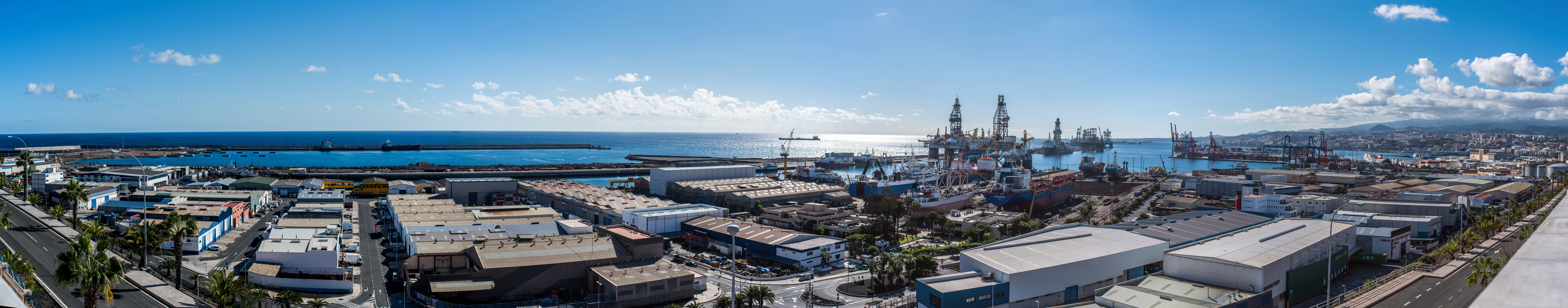
Puerto de Las Palmas 2017

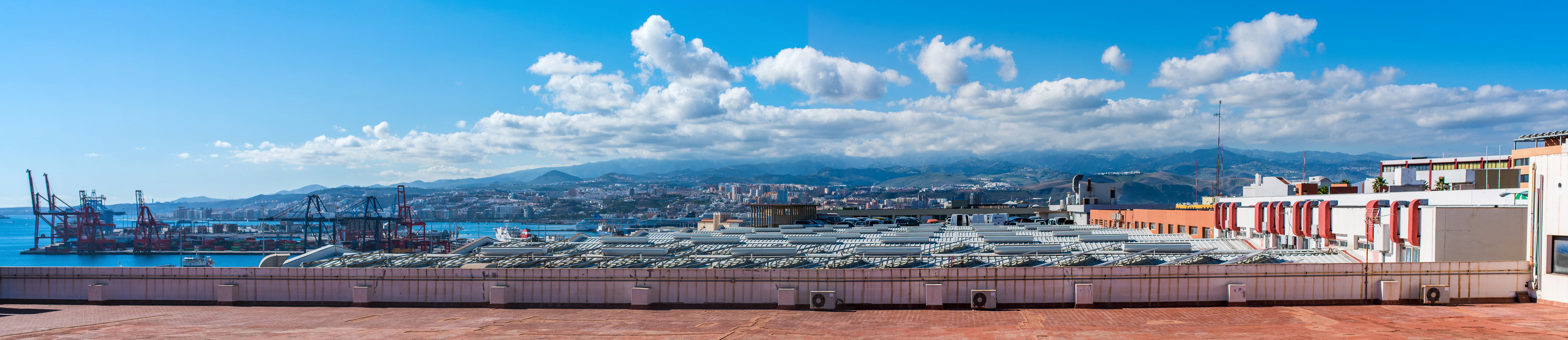
Puerto de Las Palmas 2017
