= Òscar Tusquets =

Spanish architect (born 1941)

Oscar Tusquets Blanca, (born 14 June 1941 in Barcelona) is a Spanish architect.

== Biography ==
Tusquets was born in Barcelona, Catalonia, Spain. His older sister is the novelist Esther Tusquets (30 August 1936 – 23 July 2012).

He studied at the German School of Barcelona, at the Escola de la Llotja, and at the Polytechnic University of Catalonia, where he graduated in 1965. He worked in the studio of Federico Correa and Alfons Milà i Sagnier, and in 1964 he established Studio PER, with Josep Bonet i Bertran, Cristian Cirici i Alomar and Lluís Clotet i Ballús, with whom he collaborated until 1984. His concept of design is a creative task inserted within the corresponding cultural framework.

Together with Beatriz de Moura, in 1968 he established Tusquets Editores.

== Selected works ==
Architecture

- Alfredo Kraus Auditorium, Las Palmas de Gran Canaria, 1993-1997
- Restoration and extension of the Palau de la Música Catalana, Barcelona, 1982 and 1989 (with Carles Díaz)

Urbanism

- Del Liceu al Seminari, 1980-81
- Convent dels Àngels area, 1983
- Avinguda de la Catedral, 1986
- Olympic Village, 1988-92

Furniture

- rattan chairs

Books

- Más que discutible (1994)
- Todo es comparable (1998)
- Dios lo ve (2000)
- Dalí y otros amigos (2003)
- Contra la desnudez (2007)

== Honors ==
- 1988: Premio Nacional de Diseño (with Enric Satué)
- 1987: Creu de Sant Jordi
