= Deutsche Schule Las Palmas =

Coordinates: 28.0814°N 15.4697°W

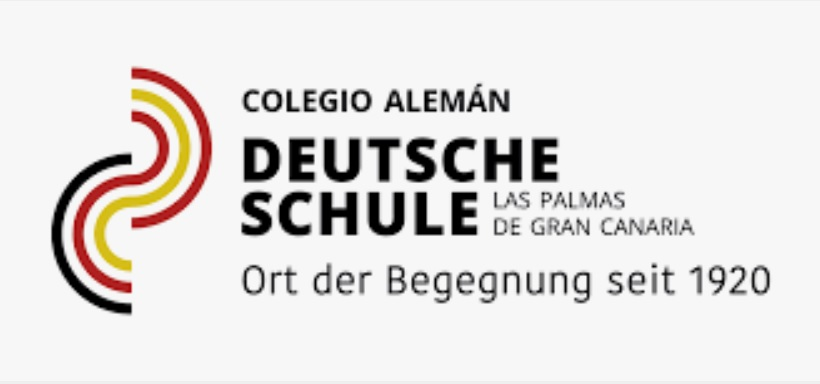
- Las Palmas, Canary Islands; Spain

Information
- Type: German international school
- Established: 1920
- Grades: Preschool, primary school, secondary school levels 5–12

Deutsche Schule Las Palmas de Gran Canaria (DSLPA; Spanish: Colegio Oficial Alemán de Las Palmas de Gran Canaria) is a German international school in Las Palmas, Canary Islands, Spain.

It serves preschool (vorschule), primary school (grundschule), and secondary school (sekundaria) levels 5–12.

It was founded in 1920.
