= Ana Vicente =

Anglo-Portuguese author and feminist

- Born: Ana Maria Lowndes Marques; 8 February 1943; Lisbon, Portugal
- Died: 19 April 2015 (aged 72); Estoril, Portugal
- Occupations: Author, feminist
- Known for: Historical and feminist writing

Ana Vicente (1943 – 2015) was an Anglo-Portuguese writer with a strong Catholic faith, known for her support for feminist causes.

== Background ==
Ana Maria Lowndes Marques Vicente was born in Lisbon on 8 February 1943. She was the daughter of the English writer and journalist Susan Lowndes Marques and the Portuguese journalist Luiz de Oliveira Marques, who jointly published the English-language Anglo-Portuguese News, and about whom she wrote in Arcádia - Notícia de uma Família Anglo-Portuguesa. On her mother's side she was a member of a distinguished line of authors and feminists. One great-grandmother was Bessie Rayner Parkes, a prominent British feminist and champion of women's suffrage. Another was Louise Swanton Belloc, a French writer and translator known for introducing important works of English literature to France and for promoting women's education. Her grandmother, Marie Belloc Lowndes, was a well-known writer of crime novels and biographies, best known for her novel, The Lodger, based on Jack the Ripper, which sold over a million copies and was made into a film by Alfred Hitchcock in 1926. Her great uncle was the poet and novelist Hilaire Belloc.

== Early life ==
Vicente was born at the English hospital in Lisbon. She lived in Lisbon until 1947 when her parents moved to Monte Estoril. For a time, she attended Portuguese-language primary schools before transferring to the English-language St. Julian's School, at which her mother would become a member of the Board of Governors and her brother, Paulo Lowndes Marques, would serve as Chairman of the Annual General Meeting. She also had a younger sister, Antonia Marques Leitão. In her youth she was a member of Catholic Action and, being classified as a Portuguese member of the school, had to join the Mocidade Portuguesa Feminina, a youth movement established by the right-wing Estado Novo government. She also spent two years at a Catholic boarding school in England that had been one of those founded by the nun, Mary Ward (1585 – 1645), to provide an education to poor children.

Vicente graduated from university with a degree in Religion, which qualified her to teach religion, and subsequently obtained a degree in Modern Languages and Portuguese and English Literature from the University of Lisbon. She was a founder-member of the Pragma Cooperative, a Catholic organization opposed to the Estado Novo, and in April 1967, was arrested by the PIDE (International and State Defence Police) and held for three days in Caxias prison near Lisbon. Pragma was subsequently dissolved.

== Working life ==
Vicente was married to António Pedro Vicente (1938 – 2024) and was the mother of two children. Initially, she worked as a teacher and translator. After the Carnation Revolution of 25 April 1974, which saw the overthrow of the Estado Novo, she became a civil servant, working in the offices of Maria de Lourdes Pintassilgo, Portugal's only female prime minister and a woman who, like Vicente, had a strong Catholic faith. She also worked for Leonor Beleza, who served as Minister of Health. Vicente was executive secretary of the Portuguese National Program to Combat Drugs, known as Project VIDA. She also worked at the Comissão para a Igualdade e para os Direitos das Mulheres (Commission for Equality and for Women's Rights), of which she was the Director from 1992 to 1996. On a personal level, Vicente was involved with the international movement We are Church, which she was responsible for introducing to Portugal in 1997, together with Maria João Sande Lemos. She carried out consultancy assignments on reproductive health in Portuguese-speaking African countries, together with Purificação Araújo, on behalf of the United Nations Population Fund.

Vicente stopped working professionally in 1998, but continued to be active as a writer, authoring fifteen books on issues of gender, history, biography, and works for children. She also worked with several non-governmental organizations, including CID, a body that aimed to support Children, the Elderly and the Disabled in institutions. She was a member of the Citizenship Education Forum and a founding member of Novo Futuro, which provides residential homes for children between 5 and 21. She was also a member of Amnesty International and the Portuguese Association of Women's Studies. Ana Vicente died at her home in Estoril on 19 April 2015, at the age of 72, of cancer.

== Publications ==
- Mulheres em Discurso (Women in Speech). 1987.
- Portugal visto pela Espanha, correspondência diplomática 1939-1960 (Portugal seen by Spain, diplomatic correspondence 1939-1960). 1992.
- As mulheres em Portugal na transição do milénio: Valores, vivências, poderes nas relações sociais entre os dois sexos (Women in Portugal in the Millennium Transition). 1998.
- Os Poderes das Mulheres, os Poderes dos Homens (The Powers of Women, the Powers of Men). 2002.
- O Príncipe Real, Luiz Filipe de Bragança (1887-1908) (The Prince Royal, Luiz Filipe of Bragança), with António Pedro Vicente. 1998.
- Direitos das Mulheres/Direitos Humanos (Women's Rights / Human Rights). 1999.,
- As Mulheres Portuguesas vistas por Viajantes Estrangeiros, séc. XVIII, XIX e XX (Portuguese Women seen by Foreign Travelers). 2000.
- Arcádia - Notícia de uma Família Anglo-Portuguesa (Arcádia - News from an Anglo-Portuguese Family). 2006.
- Ser Igreja (with Leonor Xavier). 2007.
- Catholicism in Portugal. Edited writings of Susan Lowndes. 2016.
- Memórias e outras Histórias (Memories and other Stories). 2011.

=== Children's books with illustrations by Madalena Matoso ===
- O H Perdeu uma Perna (The H lost a leg). 2005.
- Para que serve o Zero? (What is Zero for?). 2006.
- Onde Está o Mi? (Where is the Mi?). 2006.
- Onde Acaba o Arco-Íris? (Where does the Rainbow end?). 2007.

=== Contributor ===
- Dicionário no Feminino (Feminine Dictionary) published in 2005
- Feminae – Contemporary Dictionary, published in 2013.
