= Iberian Peninsula =

Peninsula in southwestern Europe

Native names: Península Ibérica (Spanish); Península Ibérica (Portuguese); Peninsula Iberica (Aragonese); Península Ibérica (Asturian); Iberiar Penintsula (Basque); Península Ibèrica (Catalan); Iberian Peninsula (English); Península Ibérica (Extremaduran); Péninsule Ibérique (French); Península Ibérica (Galician); Península Eibérica (Mirandese); Península/Pinínsula Ibérica (Fala); Peninsula Iberica (Occitan)
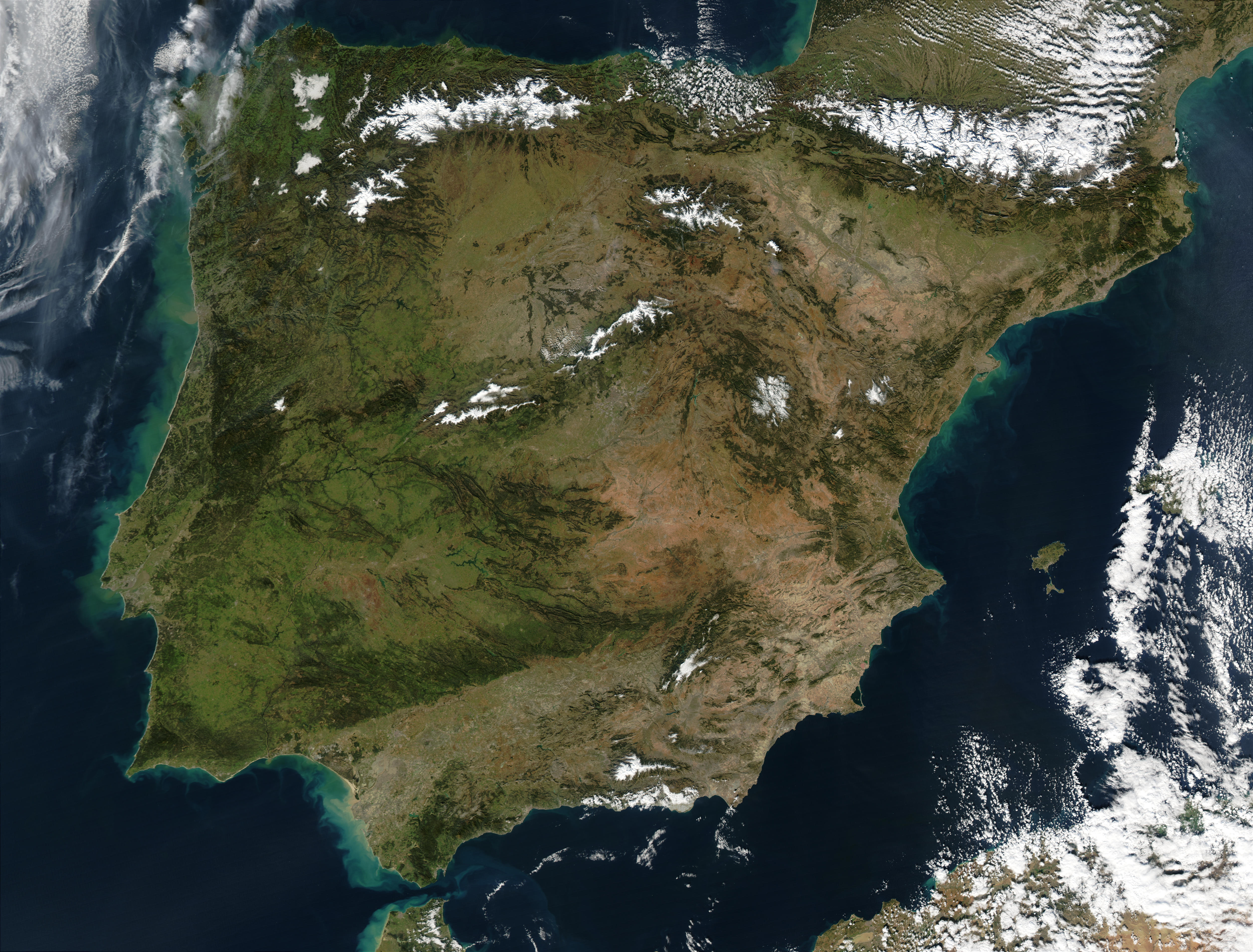
- A satellite image of the Iberian Peninsula taken in 2003

Geography
- Location: Europe
- Coordinates: 40°30′N 4°00′W
- Area: 583,254 km^{2} (225,196 sq mi)
- Highest elevation: 3,478 m (11411 ft)
- Highest point: Mulhacén

Administration
- See below

Demographics
- Demonym: Iberian
- Population: c. 53 million

The Iberian Peninsula (IPA: /aɪˈbɪəriən/ eye-BEER-ee-ən), (Note: In the local languages: Aragonese: Peninsula Iberica [peninˈsula iβeˈɾika]; Asturian: Península Ibérica [peˈninsula jˈβeɾika]; Basque: Iberiar penintsula [iβeɾi.ar penints̺ula]; Catalan: Península Ibèrica, Eastern Catalan: [pəˈninsulə iˈβɛɾikə]; Extremaduran: Península Ibérica [peˈninsula jˈβeɾika]; French: Péninsule Ibérique [penɛ̃syl ibeʁik]; Galician: Península Ibérica [peˈninsʊlɐ iˈβɛɾikɐ]; Mirandese: Península Eibérica [pɨˈnĩsulɐ ejˈβɛɾikɐ]; Occitan: Peninsula Iberica [peninˈsylɔ iβeˈɾikɔ, - ibeˈʀikɔ]; Portuguese: Península Ibérica [pɨˈnĩsulɐ iˈβɛɾikɐ]; Spanish: Península Ibérica [peˈninsula jˈβeɾika] (mostly rendered in lowercase as península ibérica).) also known as Iberia, (Note: In the local languages: Aragonese: Iberia [iˈβeɾja]; Asturian: Iberia [iˈβeɾja]; Basque: Iberia [iβeɾi.a]; Catalan: Ibèria, Eastern Catalan: [iˈβɛɾi.ə]; Extremaduran: Iberia [iˈβeɾja]; French: Ibérie [ibeʁi]; Galician: Iberia [iˈβɛɾjɐ]; Mirandese: Eibéria [ejˈβɛɾi.ɐ]; Occitan: Ibèria [iˈβɛɾi.ɔ, iˈbɛʀi.ɔ]; Portuguese: Ibéria [iˈβɛɾi.ɐ]; Spanish: Iberia [iˈβeɾja].) is a peninsula in southwestern Europe.

Mostly separated from the rest of continental Europe by the Pyrenees, the Iberian Peninsula includes Peninsular Spain (Note: Thus, strictly speaking, leaving out the mainland Spanish territory of the Aran Valley, in the northern Pyrenean watershed.) and Continental Portugal, which together make up almost all of the region, as well as Andorra, Gibraltar, and a small part of Metropolitan France. With an area of approximately 583,254 square kilometres (225,196 sq mi), and a population of roughly 53 million, it is the second-largest European peninsula by area, after the Scandinavian Peninsula.

== Etymology ==
Northeastern Iberian script from Huesca

The Iberian Peninsula was associated with the River Ebro (Ibēros in ancient Greek and Ibērus or Hibērus in Latin). For example, Ibēria was the country "this side of the Ibērus" in Strabo. Pliny asserts that the Greeks had called "the whole of the peninsula" Hiberia because of the Hiberus River.

The river appears in the Ebro Treaty of 226 BCE between Rome and Carthage, setting the limit of Carthaginian interest at the Ebro. The fullest description of the treaty, stated in Appian, uses Ibērus. With reference to this border, Polybius states that the "native name" is Ibēr, apparently the original word, stripped of its Greek or Latin -os or -us termination.

The early range of these natives, which geographers and historians place from the present southern Spain to the present southern France along the Mediterranean coast, is marked by instances of a readable script expressing a yet unknown language, dubbed "Iberian". Whether this was the native name or was given to them by the Greeks for their residence near the Ebro remains unknown. Credence in Polybius imposes certain limitations on etymologizing: if the language remains unknown, the meanings of the words, including Iber, must also remain unknown.

In modern Basque, the word ibar means "valley" or "watered meadow", while ibai means "river", but there is no proof connecting the names with Ebro or Iberia.

=== Greek name ===
The word Iberia comes from the Latin word Hiberia originating from the Ancient Greek word Ἰβηρία (Ibēríā), used by Greek geographers under the rule of the Roman Empire to refer to what is known today in English as the Iberian Peninsula. At that time, the name did not describe a single geographical entity or a distinct population; the same name was used for the Kingdom of Iberia, natively known as Kartli in the Caucasus, the core region of what would later become the Kingdom of Georgia.

It was Strabo who first reported the delineation of Iberia from Gaul (Keltikē) by the Pyrenees and included the entire land mass southwest (he says "west") from there. With the fall of the Western Roman Empire and the consolidation of Romance languages, the word "Iberia" continued the Roman word Hiberia and the Greek word Ἰβηρία.

Hecataeus of Miletus was the first known to use the term Iberia, which he wrote about c. 500 BCE. Herodotus of Halicarnassus says of the Phocaeans that "it was they who made the Greeks acquainted with [...] Iberia." According to Strabo, prior historians used Iberia to mean the country "this side of the Ἶβηρος (Ibēros, the Ebro) as far north as the Rhône, but in his day they set the Pyrenees as the limit. Polybius respects that limit, but identifies Iberia as the Mediterranean side as far south as Gibraltar, with the Atlantic side having no name. Elsewhere he says that Saguntum is "on the seaward foot of the range of hills connecting Iberia and Celtiberia."

=== Roman names ===
According to Charles Ebel, the ancient sources in both Latin and Greek use Hispania and Hiberia (Greek: Iberia) as synonyms. The confusion of the words was because of an overlapping in political and geographic perspectives. The Latin word Hiberia, similar to the Greek Iberia, literally translates to "land of the Hiberians". This word was derived from the river Hiberus, now called Ebro or Ebre. Hiber (Iberian) was thus used as a term for peoples living near the river Ebro. The first mention in Roman literature was by the annalist poet Ennius in 200 BCE. Virgil wrote impacatos (H)iberos ("restless Iberi") in his Georgics.

Roman geographers and other prose writers from the time of the late Roman Republic called the entire peninsula Hispania. In Greek and Roman antiquity, the name Hesperia was used for both the Italian and Iberian Peninsula. For the Iberian Peninsula, Hesperia Ultima, referring to its position in the far west, appears as form of disambiguation from the former among Roman writers. Since Roman antiquity, Jews have used the name Sepharad for the peninsula.

As they became politically interested in the former Carthaginian territories, the Romans began to use the names Hispania Citerior and Hispania Ulterior for 'near' and 'far' Hispania. At the time Hispania was made up of three Roman provinces: Hispania Baetica, Hispania Tarraconensis, and Hispania Lusitania. Strabo says that the Romans use Hispania and Iberia synonymously, distinguishing between the near northern and the far southern provinces. The name Iberia was ambiguous, being also the name of the Kingdom of Iberia in the Caucasus.

Whatever languages may generally have been spoken on the peninsula soon gave way to Latin, except for that of the Vascones, which was preserved as a language isolate by the barrier of the Pyrenees.

=== Modern name ===
The modern phrase "Iberian Peninsula" was coined by the French geographer Jean-Baptiste Bory de Saint-Vincent on his 1823 work "Guide du Voyageur en Espagne". Prior to that date, geographers had used the terms 'Spanish Peninsula' or 'Pyrenaean Peninsula'.

== Prehistory ==
=== Palaeolithic ===
The Iberian Peninsula has been inhabited by members of the Homo genus for at least 1.2 million years as remains found in the sites in the Atapuerca Mountains demonstrate. Among these sites is the cave of Gran Dolina, where six hominin skeletons, dated between 780,000 and one million years ago, were found in 1994. Experts have debated whether these skeletons belong to the species Homo erectus, Homo heidelbergensis, or a new species called Homo antecessor.

Around 200,000 BP, during the Lower Paleolithic period, Neanderthals first entered the Iberian Peninsula. Around 70,000 BP, during the Middle Paleolithic period, the last glacial event began and the Neanderthal Mousterian culture was established. Around 37,000 BP, during the Upper Paleolithic, the Neanderthal Châtelperronian cultural period began. Emanating from Southern France, this culture extended into the north of the peninsula. It continued to exist until around 30,000 BP, when Neanderthal man faced extinction.

About 40,000 years ago, anatomically modern humans entered the Iberian Peninsula from across the Pyrenees. On the Iberian Peninsula, modern humans developed a series of different cultures, such as the Aurignacian, Gravettian, Solutrean and Magdalenian cultures, some of them characterized by the complex forms of the art of the Upper Paleolithic.

=== Neolithic ===
During the Neolithic expansion, various megalithic cultures developed in the Iberian Peninsula. An open seas navigation culture from the east Mediterranean, called the Cardium culture, also extended its influence to the eastern coasts of the peninsula, possibly as early as the 5th millennium BCE. These people may have had some relation to the subsequent development of the Iberian civilization.

As is the case for most of the rest of Southern Europe, the principal ancestral origin of modern Iberians are Early European Farmers who arrived during the Neolithic. The large predominance of Y-Chromosome Haplogroup R1b, common throughout Western Europe, is testimony to a considerable input from various waves of (predominantly male) Western Steppe Herders from the Pontic–Caspian steppe during the Bronze Age. Iberia experienced a significant genetic turnover, with 100% of the paternal ancestry and 40% of the overall ancestry being replaced by peoples with steppe-related ancestry.

=== Chalcolithic ===
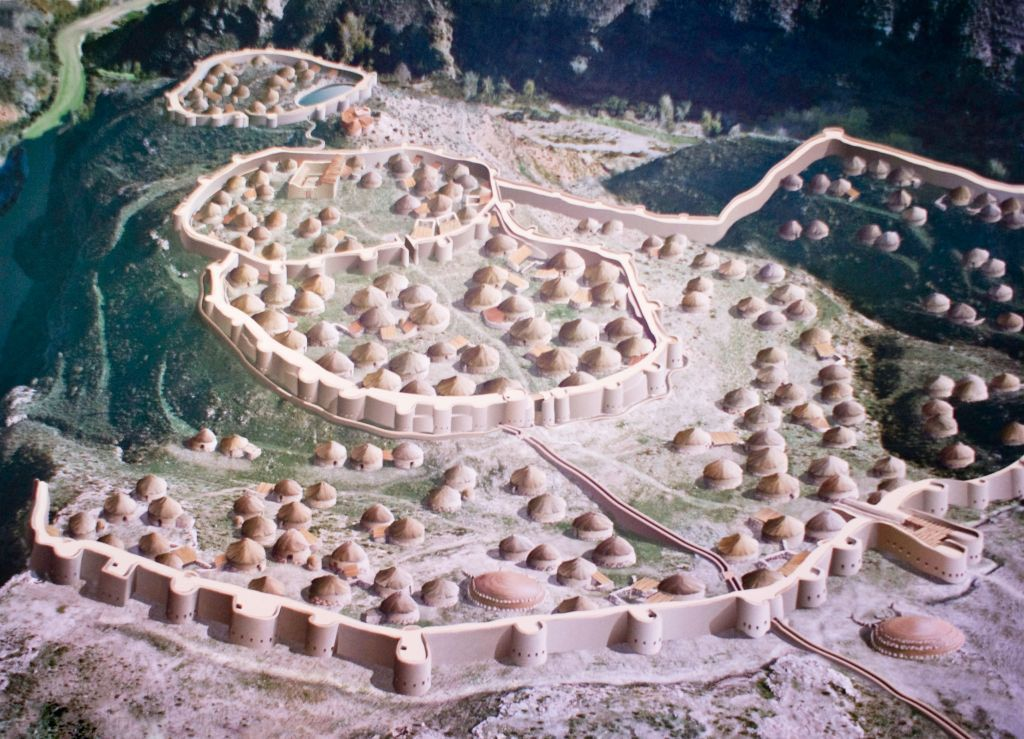
A model recreating the Chalcolithic settlement of Los Millares

In the Chalcolithic (c. 3000 BCE), a series of complex cultures developed that would give rise to the peninsula's first civilizations and to extensive exchange networks reaching to the Baltic, Middle East and North Africa. Around 2800 – 2700 BCE, the Beaker culture, which produced the Maritime Bell Beaker, probably originated in the vibrant copper-using communities of the Tagus estuary and spread from there to many parts of western Europe.

=== Bronze Age ===
The Bronze Age began on the Iberian Peninsula in 2100 cal. BC according to radiocarbon datings of several key sites.

Bronze Age cultures developed beginning c. 1800 BCE, when the culture of Los Millares was followed by that of El Argar. During the Early Bronze Age, southeastern Iberia saw the emergence of important settlements, a development that has compelled some archeologists to propose that these settlements indicate the advent of state-level social structures. From this centre, bronze metalworking technology spread to other cultures like the Bronze of Levante, South-Western Iberian Bronze and Las Cogotas.

Preceded by the Chalcolithic sites of Los Millares, the Argaric culture flourished in southeastern Iberia in from 2200 BC to 1550 BC, when depopulation of the area ensued along with disappearing of copper–bronze–arsenic metallurgy. The most accepted model for El Argar has been that of an early state society, most particularly in terms of class division, exploitation, and coercion, with agricultural production, maybe also human labour, controlled by the larger hilltop settlements, and the elite using violence in practical and ideological terms to clamp down on the population. Ecological degradation, landscape opening, fires, pastoralism, and maybe tree cutting for mining have been suggested as reasons for the collapse.

The culture of the motillas developed an early system of groundwater supply plants (the so-called motillas) in the upper Guadiana basin (in the southern meseta) in a context of extreme aridification in the area in the wake of the 4.2-kiloyear climatic event, which roughly coincided with the transition from the Copper Age to the Bronze Age. Increased precipitation and recovery of the water table from about 1800 BC onward should have led to the forsaking of the motillas (which may have flooded) and the redefinition of the relation of the inhabitants of the territory with the environment.

== Proto-history ==
Iberia before the Carthaginian conquests c. 300 BCE.

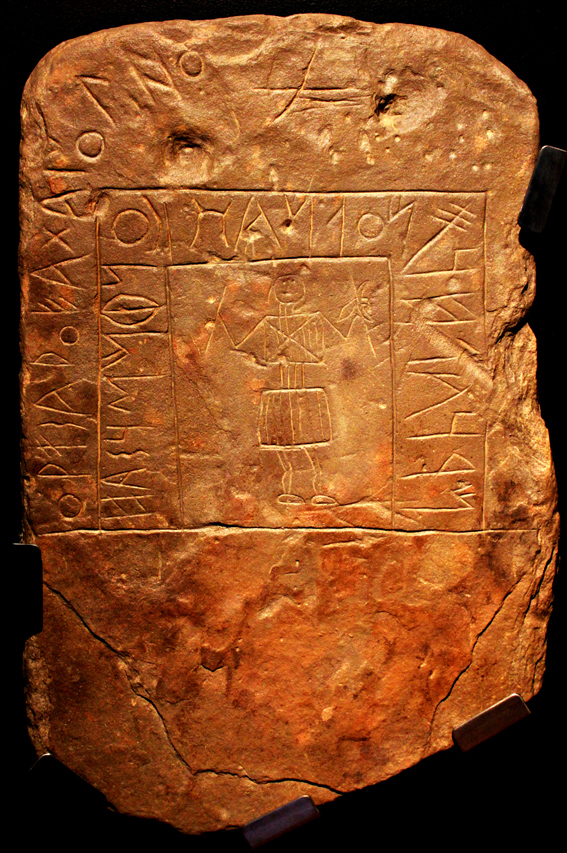
An instance of the Southwest Paleohispanic script inscribed in the Abóbada I stele.

By the Iron Age, starting in the 8th century BCE, the Iberian Peninsula consisted of complex agrarian and urban civilizations, either Pre-Celtic or Celtic (such as the Celtiberians, Gallaeci, Astures, Celtici, Lusitanians and others), the cultures of the Iberians in the eastern and southern zones and the cultures of the Aquitanian in the western portion of the Pyrenees.

As early as the 12th century BCE, the Phoenicians, a thalassocratic civilization originally from the Eastern Mediterranean, began to explore the coastline of the peninsula, interacting with the metal-rich communities in the southwest of the peninsula, contemporarily known as the semi-mythical Tartessos. Around 1100 BCE, Phoenician merchants from Tyre founded the trading colony of Gadir. Phoenicians established a permanent trading port in the Gadir colony c. 800 BCE in response to the increasing demand of silver from the Assyrian Empire.

The seafaring Phoenicians, Greeks and Carthaginians successively settled along the Mediterranean coast and founded trading colonies there over several centuries. While early Greek trade activities in the Western Mediterranean trace back the 8th century BCE, it was not until the 6th century BCE when Phocaeans founded Massalia and Emporion, and thus their footprint on the eastern and northeastern seaboard of the Iberian Peninsula accrued.

Together with the presence of Phoenician and Greek epigraphy, several paleohispanic scripts developed in the Iberian Peninsula along the 1st millennium BCE. The development of a primordial paleohispanic script antecessor to the rest of paleohispanic scripts (originally supposed to be a non-redundant semi-syllabary) derived from the Phoenician alphabet and originated in Southwestern Iberia by the 7th century BCE has been tentatively proposed. The severing of links with Tyre prompted an increase of relations of Phoenician-Punic Gadir with Carthage. The nature of the relationship of the Far West Phoenicians with Carthage has been a moot question in academia, with historiographical approaches ranging in between a straight Carthaginian hegemony over Gadir and a more autonomous Phoenician Far West.

In 348 BCE, the territories of the Iberian Peninsula were formally put under the Carthaginian sphere of influence under the purview of the terms of the second treaty between Rome and Carthage. Following the Carthaginian loss of Sicily and Sardinia to the Romans, the Barcids went on to militarily conquer the peninsular territories in 237 BCE, proceeding to put coastal Iberians and Turdetani as well as some Celtic inland peoples under their grip, and founding Akra Leuké and Qart-Hadast.

== History ==
=== Roman rule ===
Roman conquest: 220 BCE – 19 BCE

In 218 BCE, during the Second Punic War against the Carthaginians, the first Roman troops occupied the Iberian Peninsula, known to them as Hispania. After 197, the territories of the peninsula most accustomed to external contact and with the most urban tradition (the Mediterranean Coast and the Guadalquivir Valley) were divided by Romans into Hispania Ulterior and Hispania Citerior. Local rebellions were quelled, with a 195 Roman campaign under Cato the Elder ravaging hotspots of resistance in the northeastern Ebro Valley and beyond.

The threat to Roman interests posed by Celtiberians and Lusitanians in uncontrolled territories lingered on. Further wars of indigenous resistance, such as the Celtiberian Wars and the Lusitanian War, were fought in the 2nd century. Urban growth took place, and population progressively moved from hillforts to the plains.

An example of the interaction of slaving and ecocide, the aftermath of the conquest increased mining extractive processes in the southwest of the peninsula, which required a massive number of forced laborers, initially from Hispania and latter also from the Gallic borderlands and other locations of the Mediterranean. This caused far-reaching environmental outcomes, vis-à-vis long-term global pollution records, with levels of atmospheric pollution from mining across the Mediterranean during Classical Antiquity having no match until the Industrial Revolution.

In addition to mineral extraction, of which the region was the leading supplier in the early Roman world, with production of the likes of gold, silver, copper, lead, and cinnabar, Hispania also produced manufactured goods, such as sigillata pottery, colourless glass, linen garments. Rural products included fish and fish sauce (garum), and dry crops such as wheat and, more importantly, esparto, olive oil, and wine.

The process of Romanization spurred on throughout the first century BC. The peninsula was also the battleground of civil wars between rulers of the Roman republic; such as the Sertorian War, and the conflict between Caesar and Pompey later in the century.

During their 600-year occupation of the Iberian Peninsula, the Romans introduced the Latin language which developed into the languages of the Iberian peninsula today, with the exception of Basque.

=== Pre-modern Iberia ===
Germanic and Byzantine rule c. 560

In the early fifth century, Germanic peoples occupied the peninsula, namely the Suebi, the Vandals (Silingi and Hasdingi) and their allies, the Alans. Only the kingdom of the Suebi (Quadi and Marcomanni) would endure after the arrival of another wave of Germanic invaders, the Visigoths, who occupied all of the Iberian Peninsula and expelled or partially integrated the Vandals and the Alans. The Visigoths eventually occupied the Suebi kingdom and its capital city, Bracara (modern day Braga), in 584–585. They would also occupy the province of the Byzantine Empire (552–624) of Spania in the south of the peninsula. However, Balearic Islands remained in Byzantine hands until Umayyad conquest, which began in 703 CE and was completed in 902 CE.

In 711, a Muslim army conquered the Visigothic Kingdom in Hispania. Under Tariq ibn Ziyad, the Islamic army landed at Gibraltar and, in an eight-year campaign, occupied all except the northern kingdoms of the Iberian Peninsula in the Umayyad conquest of Hispania. Al-Andalus (Arabic: الإندلس, tr. al-ʾAndalūs, possibly "Land of the Vandals"), is the Arabic name given to Muslim Iberia. The Muslim conquerors were Arabs and Berbers; following the conquest, conversion and arabization of the Hispano-Roman population took place, (muwalladum or Muladí). After a long process, spurred on in the 9th and 10th centuries, the majority of the population in Al-Andalus eventually converted to Islam. The Muslims were referred to by the generic name Moors. The Muslim population was divided per ethnicity (Arabs, Berbers, Muladí), and the supremacy of Arabs over the rest of group was a recurrent causal for strife, rivalry and hatred, particularly between Arabs and Berbers. Arab elites could be further divided in the Yemenites (first wave) and the Syrians (second wave). Christians and Jews were allowed to live as part of a stratified society under the dhimmah system, although Jews became very important in certain fields. Some Christians migrated to the Northern Christian kingdoms, while those who stayed in Al-Andalus progressively arabised and became known as musta'arab (mozarabs). The slave population comprised the Ṣaqāliba (literally meaning "slavs", although they were slaves of generic European origin) as well as Sudanese slaves.

Islamic rule: al-Andalus c. 1000

The Umayyad rulers faced a major Berber Revolt in the early 740s; the uprising originally broke out in North Africa (Tangier) and later spread across the peninsula. Following the Abbasid takeover from the Umayyads and the shift of the economic centre of the Islamic Caliphate from Damascus to Baghdad, the western province of al-Andalus was marginalised and ultimately became politically autonomous as independent emirate in 756, ruled by one of the last surviving Umayyad royals, Abd al-Rahman I. Al-Andalus became a center of culture and learning, especially during the Caliphate of Córdoba. The Caliphate reached the height of its power under the rule of Abd-ar-Rahman III and his successor al-Hakam II, becoming then, in the view of Jaime Vicens Vives, "the most powerful state in Europe". Abd-ar-Rahman III also managed to expand the clout of Al-Andalus across the Strait of Gibraltar, waging war, as well as his successor, against the Fatimid Empire.

Between the 8th and 12th centuries, Al-Andalus enjoyed a notable urban vitality, both in terms of the growth of the preexisting cities as well as in terms of founding of new ones: Córdoba reached a population of 100,000 by the 10th century, Toledo 30,000 by the 11th century and Seville 80,000 by the 12th century.

During the Middle Ages, the North of the peninsula housed many small Christian polities including the Kingdom of Castile, the Kingdom of Aragon, the Kingdom of Navarre, the Kingdom of León or the Kingdom of Portugal, as well as a number of counties that spawned from the Carolingian Marca Hispanica. Christian and Muslim polities fought and allied among themselves in variable alliances. (Note: Christian forces were usually better armoured than their Muslim counterparts, with noble and non-noble milites and cavallers wearing mail hauberks, separate mail coifs and metal helmets, and armed with maces, cavalry axes, sword and lances.) The Christian kingdoms progressively expanded south taking over Muslim territory in what is historiographically known as the "Reconquista" (the latter concept has been however noted as product of the claim to a pre-existing Spanish Catholic nation and it would not necessarily convey adequately "the complexity of centuries of warring and other more peaceable interactions between Muslim and Christian kingdoms in medieval Iberia between 711 and 1492").

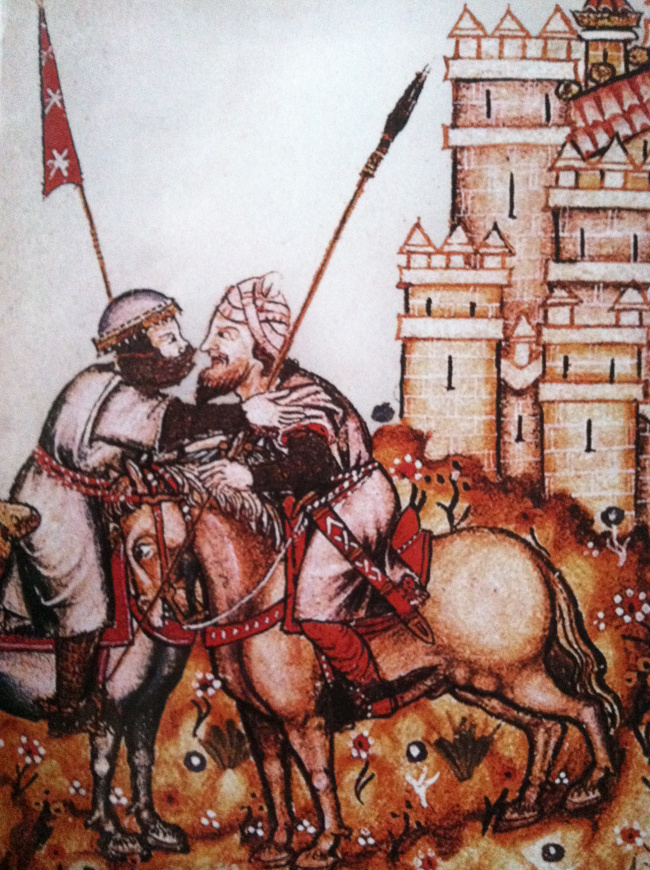
Two warriors embrace before the siege of Chincoya Castle (Cantigas de Santa Maria).

The Caliphate of Córdoba was subsumed in a period of upheaval and civil war (the Fitna of al-Andalus) and collapsed in the early 11th century, spawning a series of ephemeral statelets, the taifas. Until the mid 11th century, most of the territorial expansion southwards of the Kingdom of Asturias/León was carried out through a policy of agricultural colonization rather than through military operations; then, profiting from the feebleness of the taifa principalities, Ferdinand I of León seized Lamego and Viseu (1057–1058) and Coimbra (1064) away from the Taifa of Badajoz (at times at war with the Taifa of Seville); Meanwhile, in the same year Coimbra was conquered, in the Northeastern part of the Iberian Peninsula, the Kingdom of Aragon took Barbastro from the Hudid Taifa of Lérida as part of an international expedition sanctioned by Pope Alexander II. Most critically, Alfonso VI of León-Castile conquered Toledo and its wider taifa in 1085, in what it was seen as a critical event at the time, entailing also a huge territorial expansion, advancing from the Sistema Central to La Mancha. In 1086, following the siege of Zaragoza by Alfonso VI of León-Castile, the Almoravids, religious zealots originally from the deserts of the Maghreb, landed in the Iberian Peninsula, and, having inflicted a serious defeat to Alfonso VI at the battle of Zalaca, began to seize control of the remaining taifas.

The Almoravids in the Iberian peninsula progressively relaxed strict observance of their faith, and treated both Jews and Mozarabs harshly, facing uprisings across the peninsula, initially in the Western part. The Almohads, another North-African Muslim sect of Masmuda Berber origin who had previously undermined the Almoravid rule south of the Strait of Gibraltar, first entered the peninsula in 1146.

Somewhat straying from the trend taking place in other locations of the Latin West since the 10th century, the period comprising the 11th and 13th centuries was not one of weakening monarchical power in the Christian kingdoms. The relatively novel concept of "frontier" (Sp: frontera), already reported in Aragon by the second half of the 11th century become widespread in the Christian Iberian kingdoms by the beginning of the 13th century, in relation to the more or less conflictual border with Muslim lands.

By the beginning of the 13th century, a power reorientation took place in the Iberian Peninsula (parallel to the Christian expansion in Southern Iberia and the increasing commercial impetus of Christian powers across the Mediterranean) and to a large extent, trade-wise, the Iberian Peninsula reorientated towards the North away from the Muslim World.

During the Middle Ages, the monarchs of Castile and León, from Alfonso V and Alfonso VI (crowned Hispaniae Imperator) to Alfonso X and Alfonso XI tended to embrace an imperial ideal based on a dual Christian and Jewish ideology. Despite the hegemonic ambitions of its rulers and the consolidation of the union of Castile and León after 1230, it should be pointed that, except for a brief period in the 1330s and 1340s, Castile tended to be nonetheless "essentially unstable" from a political standpoint until the late 15th century.

Merchants from Genoa and Pisa were conducting an intense trading activity in Catalonia already by the 12th century, and later in Portugal. Since the 13th century, the Crown of Aragon expanded overseas; led by Catalans, it attained an overseas empire in the Western Mediterranean, with a presence in Mediterranean islands such as the Balearics, Sicily and Sardinia, and even conquering Naples in the mid-15th century. Genoese merchants invested heavily in the Iberian commercial enterprise with Lisbon becoming, according to Virgínia Rau, the "great centre of Genoese trade" in the early 14th century. The Portuguese would later detach their trade to some extent from Genoese influence. The Nasrid Kingdom of Granada, neighbouring the Strait of Gibraltar and founded upon a vassalage relationship with the Crown of Castile, also insinuated itself into the European mercantile network, with its ports fostering intense trading relations with the Genoese as well, but also with the Catalans, and to a lesser extent, with the Venetians, the Florentines, and the Portuguese.

Between 1275 and 1340, Granada became involved in the "crisis of the Strait", and was caught in a complex geopolitical struggle ("a kaleidoscope of alliances") with multiple powers vying for dominance of the Western Mediterranean, complicated by the unstable relations of Muslim Granada with the Marinid Sultanate. The conflict reached a climax in the 1340 Battle of Río Salado, when, this time in alliance with Granada, the Marinid Sultan (and Caliph pretender) Abu al-Hasan Ali ibn Othman made the last Marinid attempt to set up a power base in the Iberian Peninsula. The lasting consequences of the resounding Muslim defeat to an alliance of Castile and Portugal with naval support from Aragon and Genoa ensured Christian supremacy over the Iberian Peninsula and the preeminence of Christian fleets in the Western Mediterranean.

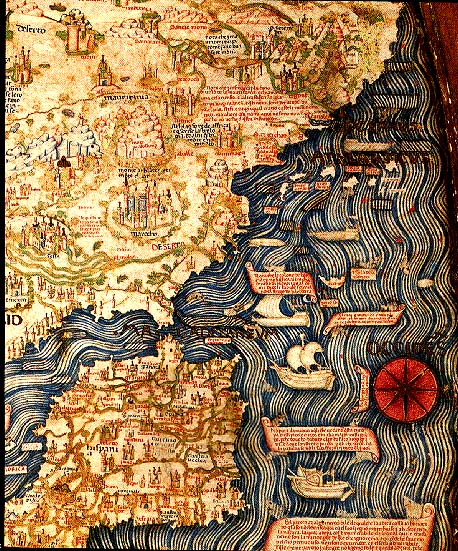
Map of the Iberian Peninsula and Northern Africa (inverted) by Fra Mauro (ca. 1450)

The 1348–1350 bubonic plague devastated large parts of the Iberian Peninsula, leading to a sudden economic cessation. Many settlements in northern Castile and Catalonia were left forsaken. The plague marked the start of the hostility and downright violence towards religious minorities (particularly the Jews) as an additional consequence in the Iberian realms.

The 14th century was a period of great upheaval in the Iberian realms. After the death of Peter the Cruel of Castile (reigned 1350–69), the House of Trastámara succeeded to the throne in the person of Peter's half brother, Henry II (reigned 1369–79). In the kingdom of Aragón, following the death without heirs of John I (reigned 1387–96) and Martin I (reigned 1396–1410), a prince of the House of Trastámara, Ferdinand I (reigned 1412–16), succeeded to the Aragonese throne. The Hundred Years' War also spilled over into the Iberian peninsula, with Castile particularly taking a role in the conflict by providing key naval support to France that helped lead to that nation's eventual victory. After the accession of Henry III to the throne of Castile, the populace, exasperated by the preponderance of Jewish influence, perpetrated a massacre of Jews at Toledo. In 1391, mobs went from town to town throughout Castile and Aragon, killing an estimated 50,000 Jews, or even as many as 100,000, according to Jane Gerber. Women and children were sold as slaves to Muslims, and many synagogues were converted into churches. According to Hasdai Crescas, about 70 Jewish communities were destroyed.

During the 15th century, Portugal, which had ended its southwards territorial expansion across the Iberian Peninsula in 1249 with the conquest of the Algarve, initiated an overseas expansion in parallel to the rise of the House of Aviz, conquering Ceuta (1415) arriving at Porto Santo (1418), Madeira and the Azores, as well as establishing additional outposts along the North-African Atlantic coast. In addition, already in the Early Modern Period, between the completion of the Granada War in 1492 and the death of Ferdinand of Aragon in 1516, the Hispanic Monarchy would make strides in the imperial expansion along the Mediterranean coast of the Maghreb. During the Late Middle Ages, the Jews acquired considerable power and influence in Castile and Aragon.

Throughout the late Middle Ages, the Crown of Aragon took part in the mediterranean slave trade, with Barcelona (already in the 14th century), Valencia (particularly in the 15th century) and, to a lesser extent, Palma de Mallorca (since the 13th century), becoming dynamic centres in this regard, involving chiefly eastern and Muslim peoples. Castile engaged later in this economic activity, rather by adhering to the incipient atlantic slave trade involving sub-saharan people thrusted by Portugal (Lisbon being the largest slave centre in Western Europe) since the mid 15th century, with Seville becoming another key hub for the slave trade. Following the advance in the conquest of the Nasrid kingdom of Granada, the seizure of Málaga entailed the addition of another notable slave centre for the Crown of Castile.

By the end of the 15th century (1490) the Iberian kingdoms (including here the Balearic Islands) had an estimated population of 6.525 million (Crown of Castile, 4.3 million; Portugal, 1.0 million; Principality of Catalonia, 0.3 million; Kingdom of Valencia, 0.255 million; Kingdom of Granada, 0.25 million; Kingdom of Aragon, 0.25 million; Kingdom of Navarre, 0.12 million and the Kingdom of Mallorca, 0.05 million).

For three decades in the 15th century, the Hermandad de las Marismas, the trading association formed by the ports of Castile along the Cantabrian coast, resembling in some ways the Hanseatic League, fought against the latter, an ally of England, a rival of Castile in political and economic terms. Castile sought to claim the Gulf of Biscay as its own. In 1419, the powerful Castilian navy thoroughly defeated a Hanseatic fleet in La Rochelle.

In the late 15th century, the imperial ambition of the Iberian powers was pushed to new heights by the Catholic Monarchs in Castile and Aragon, and by Manuel I in Portugal.

Iberian Kingdoms in 1400

The last Muslim stronghold, Granada, was conquered by a combined Castilian and Aragonese force in 1492. As many as 100,000 Moors died or were enslaved in the military campaign, while 200,000 fled to North Africa. Muslims and Jews throughout the period were variously tolerated or shown intolerance in different Christian kingdoms. After the fall of Granada, all Muslims and Jews were ordered to convert to Christianity or face expulsion—as many as 200,000 Jews were expelled from Spain. Approximately 3,000,000 Muslims fled or were driven out of Spain between 1492 and 1610. Historian Henry Kamen estimates that some 25,000 Jews died en route from Spain. The Jews were also expelled from Sicily and Sardinia, which were under Aragonese rule, and an estimated 37,000 to 100,000 Jews left.

In 1497, King Manuel I of Portugal forced all Jews in his kingdom to convert or leave. That same year he expelled all Muslims that were not slaves, and in 1502 the Catholic Monarchs followed suit, imposing the choice of conversion to Christianity or exile and loss of property. Many Jews and Muslims fled to North Africa and the Ottoman Empire, while others publicly converted to Christianity and became known respectively as Marranos and Moriscos (after the old term Moors). However, many of these continued to practice their religion in secret. The Moriscos revolted several times and were ultimately forcibly expelled from Spain in the early 17th century. From 1609 to 1614, over 300,000 Moriscos were sent on ships to North Africa and other locations, and, of this figure, around 50,000 died resisting the expulsion, and 60,000 died on the journey.

A series of case studies by the Belfer Center for Science and International Affairs at Harvard University demonstrated that the change of relative supremacy from Portugal to the Hispanic Monarchy in the late 15th century was one of the few cases of avoidance of the Thucydides Trap.

=== Modern Iberia ===
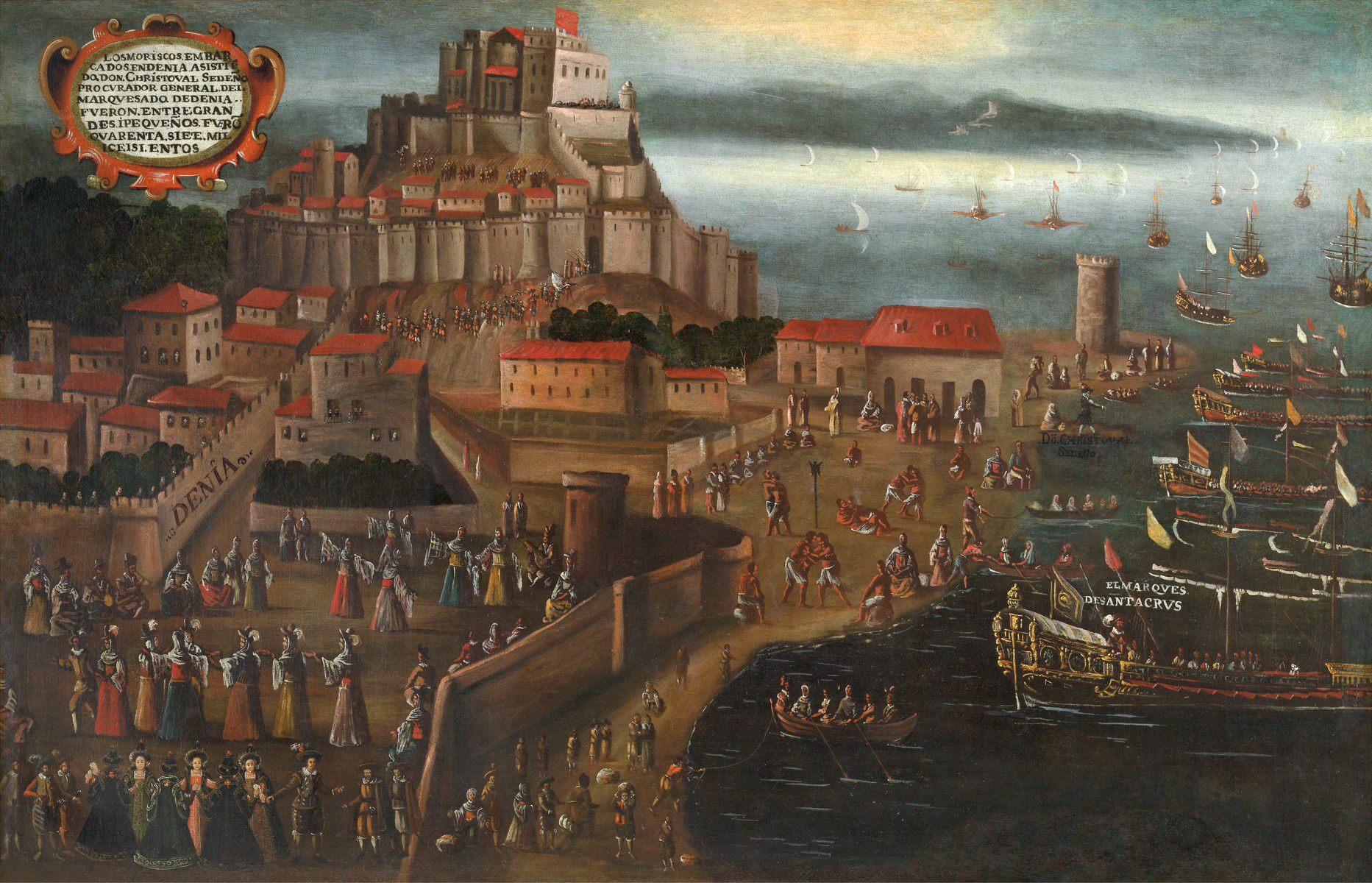
Expelling of the moriscos in the Port of Denia

Challenging the conventions about the advent of modernity, Immanuel Wallerstein pushed back the origins of the capitalist modernity to the Iberian expansion of the 15th century. During the 16th century Spain created a vast empire in the Americas, with a state monopoly in Seville becoming the center of the ensuing transatlantic trade, based on bullion. Iberian imperialism, starting by the Portuguese establishment of routes to Asia and the posterior transatlantic trade with the New World by Spaniards and Portuguese (along Dutch, English and French), precipitated the economic decline of the Italian Peninsula. The 16th century was one of population growth with increased pressure over resources; in the case of the Iberian Peninsula a part of the population moved to the Americas meanwhile Jews and Moriscos were banished, relocating to other places in the Mediterranean Basin. Most of the Moriscos remained in Spain after the Morisco revolt in Las Alpujarras during the mid-16th century, but roughly 300,000 of them were expelled from the country in 1609–1614, and emigrated en masse to North Africa.

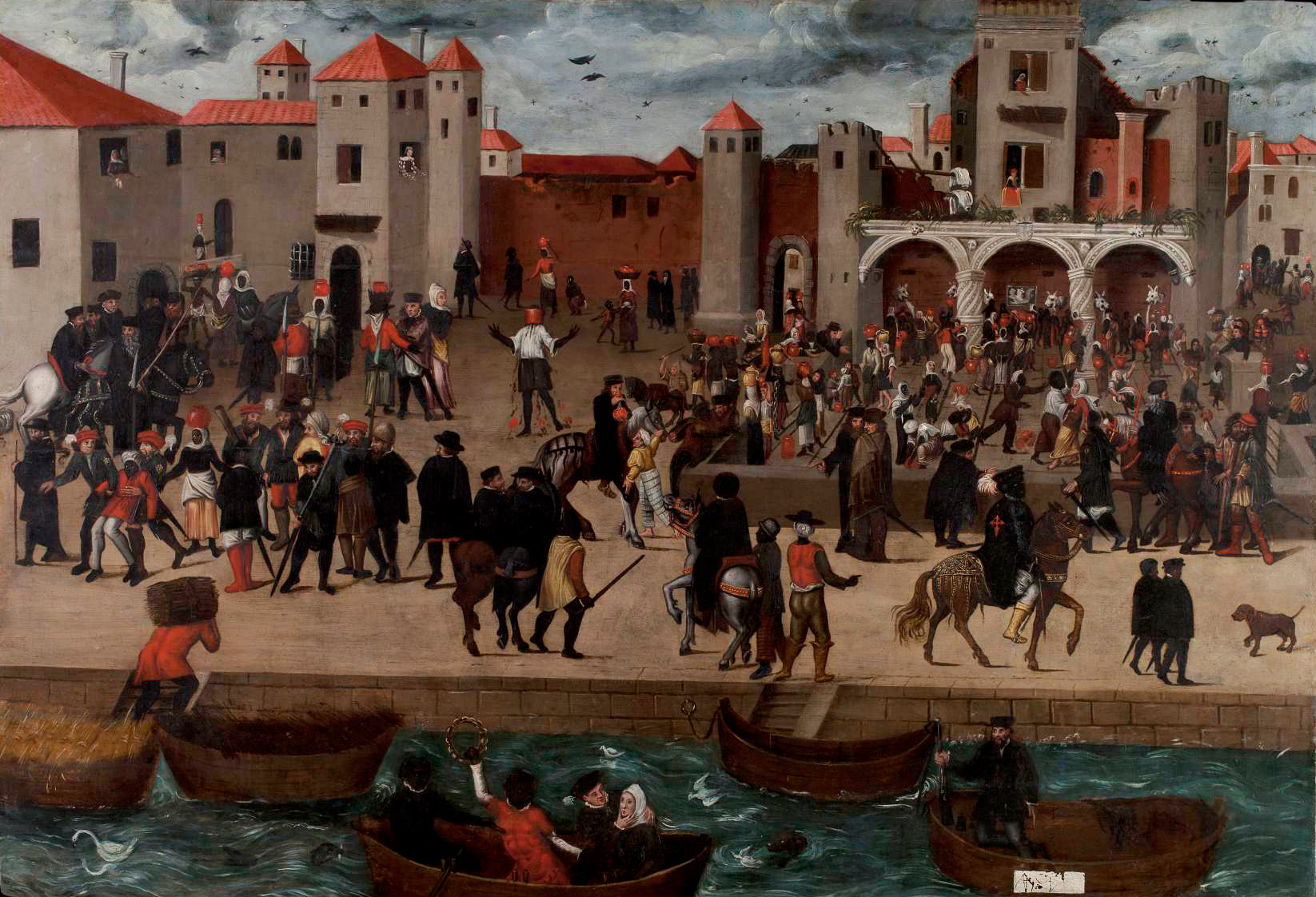
An anonymous picture depicting Lisbon, the centre of the slave trade, by the late 16th century.

In 1580, after the political crisis that followed the 1578 death of King Sebastian, Portugal became a dynastic composite entity of the Hapsburg Monarchy; thus, the whole peninsula was united politically during the period known as the Iberian Union (1580–1640). During the reign of Philip II of Spain (I of Portugal), the Councils of Portugal, Italy, Flanders and Burgundy were added to the group of counselling institutions of the Hispanic Monarchy, to which the Councils of Castile, Aragon, Indies, Chamber of Castile, Inquisition, Orders, and Crusade already belonged, defining the organization of the Royal court that underpinned the Polysynodial System through which the empire operated. During the Iberian union, the "first great wave" of the transatlantic slave trade happened, according to Enriqueta Vila Villar, as new markets opened because of the unification gave thrust to the slave trade.

By 1600, the percentage of urban population for Spain was roughly 11.4%, while for Portugal the urban population was estimated as 14.1%, which were both above the 7.6% European average of the time (edged only by the Low Countries and the Italian Peninsula). Some striking differences appeared among the different Iberian realms. Castile, extending across a 60% of the territory of the peninsula and having 80% of the population was a rather urbanised country, yet with a widespread distribution of cities. Meanwhile, the urban population in the Crown of Aragon was highly concentrated in a handful of cities: Zaragoza (Kingdom of Aragon), Barcelona (Principality of Catalonia), and, to a lesser extent in the Kingdom of Valencia, in Valencia, Alicante and Orihuela. The case of Portugal presented an hypertrophied capital, Lisbon (which greatly increased its population during the 16th century, from 56,000 to 60,000 inhabitants by 1527, to roughly 120,000 by the third quarter of the century) with its demographic dynamism stimulated by the Asian trade, followed at great distance by Porto and Évora (both roughly accounting for 12,500 inhabitants). Throughout most of the 16th century, both Lisbon and Seville were among Western Europe's largest and most dynamic cities.

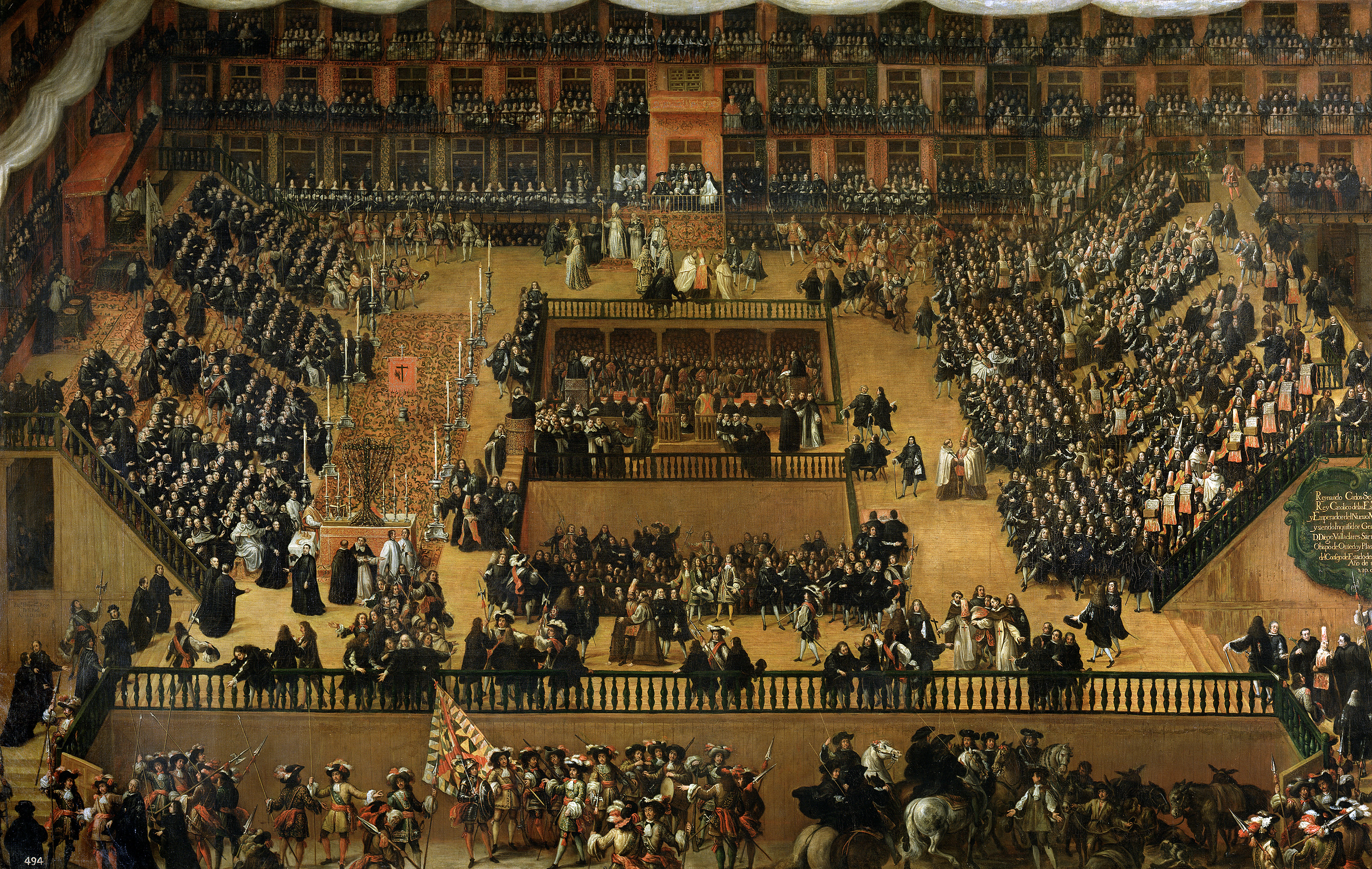
Spanish Inquisition's auto-da-fé held in the Plaza Mayor, Madrid in 1680

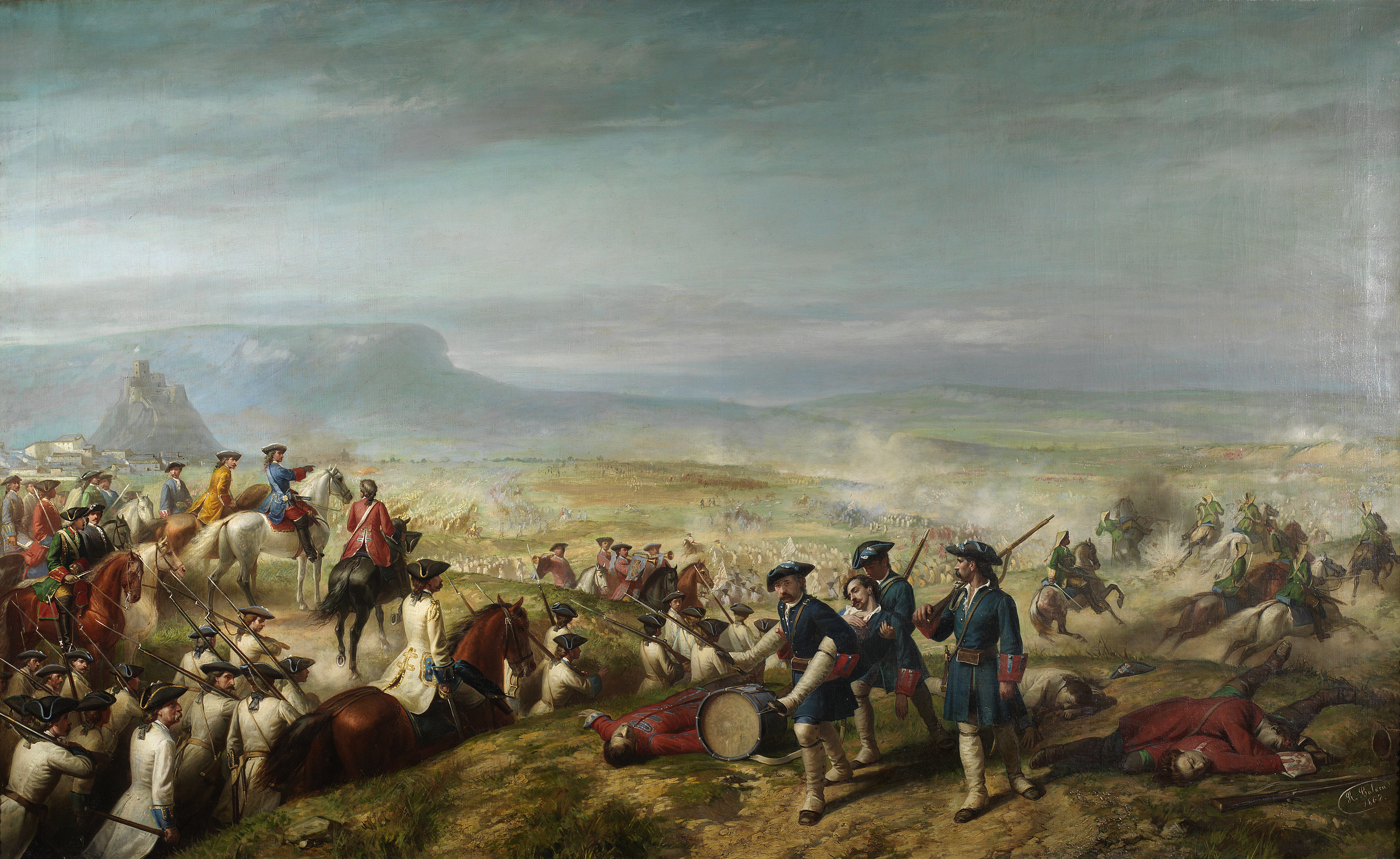
The battle of Almansa was the decisive battle in the War of the Spanish Succession

The 17th century has been largely considered as a very negative period for the Iberian economies, seen as a time of recession, crisis or even decline, the urban dynamism chiefly moving to Northern Europe. A dismantling of the inner city network in the Castilian plateau took place during this period (with a parallel accumulation of economic activity in the capital, Madrid), with only New Castile resisting recession in the interior. Regarding the Atlantic façade of Castile, aside from the severing of trade with Northern Europe, inter-regional trade with other regions in the Iberian Peninsula also suffered to some extent. In Aragon, suffering from similar problems than Castile, the expelling of the Moriscos in 1609 in the Kingdom of Valencia aggravated the recession. Silk turned from a domestic industry into a raw commodity to be exported. However, the crisis was uneven (affecting longer the centre of the peninsula), as both Portugal and the Mediterranean coastline recovered in the later part of the century by fuelling a sustained growth.

The aftermath of the intermittent 1640–1668 Portuguese Restoration War brought the House of Braganza as the new ruling dynasty in the Portuguese territories across the world (bar Ceuta), putting an end to the Iberian Union.

Despite both Portugal and Spain starting their path towards modernization with the liberal revolutions of the first half of the 19th century, this process was, concerning structural changes in the geographical distribution of the population, relatively tame compared to what took place after World War II in the Iberian Peninsula, when strong urban development ran in parallel to substantial rural flight patterns.

== Geography and geology ==
A topographic map of the Iberian Peninsula

The Iberian Peninsula is the westernmost of the three major southern European peninsulas—the Iberian, Italian, and Balkan. It forms the westernmost portion of the larger Eurasian landmass. It is bordered on the southeast and east by the Mediterranean Sea, and on the north, west, and southwest by the Atlantic Ocean. The Pyrenees mountains are situated along the northeast edge of the peninsula, where it adjoins the rest of Europe. Its southern tip, located in Tarifa is the southernmost point of the European continent and is very close to the northwest coast of Africa, separated from it by the Strait of Gibraltar and the Mediterranean Sea.

The Iberian Peninsula encompasses 583,254 km^{2} and has very contrasting and uneven topograph. The mountain ranges of the Iberian Peninsula are mainly distributed from west to east, and in some cases reach altitudes of approximately 3,000 mamsl, resulting in the region having the second highest mean altitude (637 mamsl) in Western Europe.

The Iberian Peninsula extends from the southernmost extremity at Punta de Tarifa to the northernmost extremity at Punta de Estaca de Bares over a distance between lines of latitude of about 865 km (537 mi) based on a degree length of 111 km (69 mi) per degree, and from the westernmost extremity at Cabo da Roca to the easternmost extremity at Cap de Creus over a distance between lines of longitude at 40° N latitude of about 1,155 km (718 mi) based on an estimated degree length of about 90 km (56 mi) for that latitude. The irregular, roughly octagonal shape of the peninsula contained within this spherical quadrangle was compared by the ancient geographer Strabo to an ox-hide.

	Punta de Estaca de Bares (43°47′38″N 7°41′17″W)	
Cabo da Roca (38°46′51″N 9°29′54″W)		Cap de Creus (42°19′09″N 3°19′19″E)
	Punta de Tarifa (36°00′15″N 5°36′37″W)	

About three quarters of that rough octagon is the Meseta Central, a vast plateau ranging from 610 to 760 m in altitude. It is located approximately in the centre, staggered slightly to the east and tilted slightly toward the west. The conventional centre of the Iberian Peninsula has long been considered Getafe just south of Madrid. It is ringed by mountains and contains the sources of most of the rivers, which find their way through gaps in the mountain barriers on all sides.

=== Coastline ===
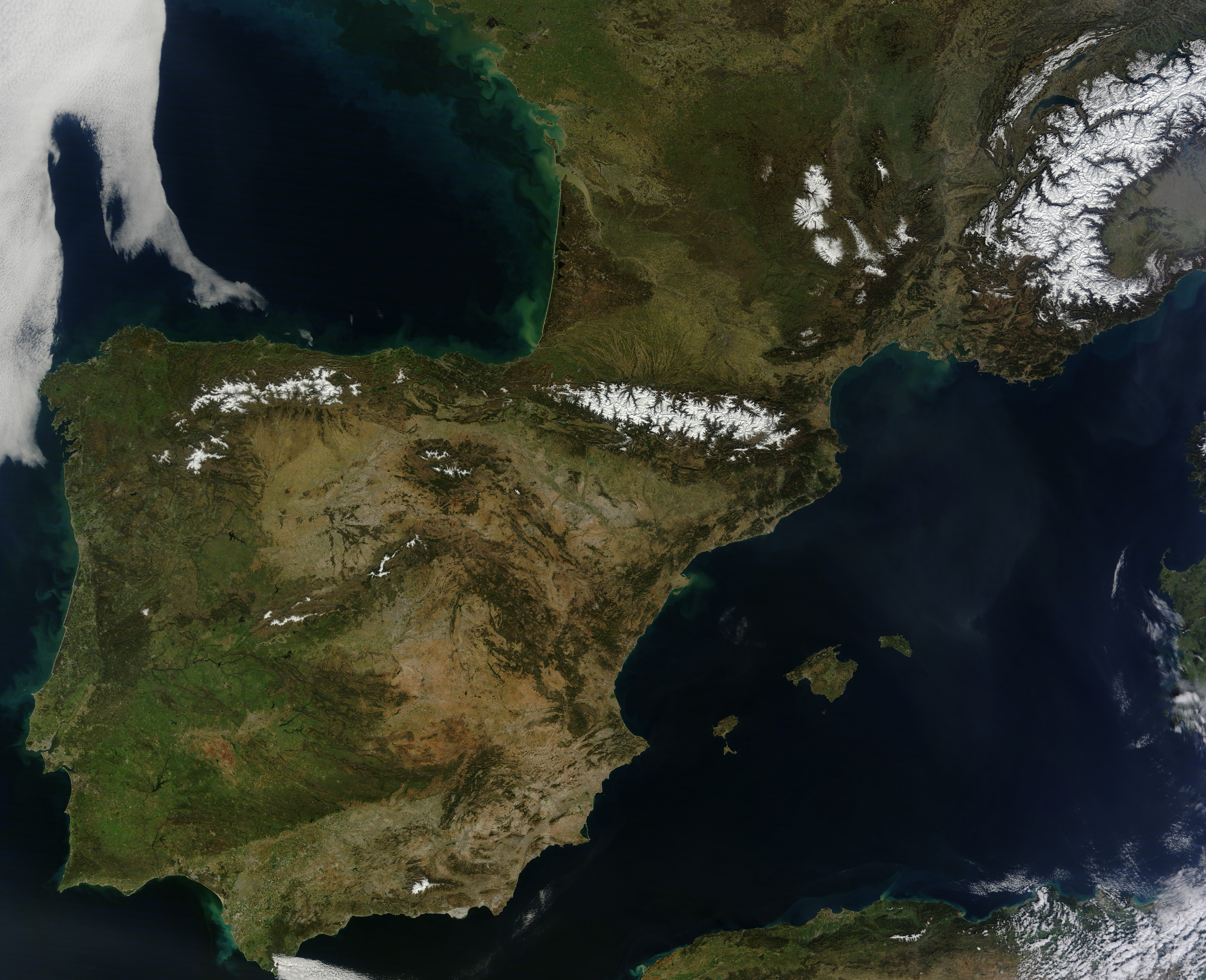
The Iberian Peninsula and Southern France, satellite photo on a cloudless day in March 2014

The coastline of the Iberian Peninsula is 3,313 km (2,059 mi), 1,660 km (1,030 mi) on the Mediterranean side and 1,653 km (1,027 mi) on the Atlantic side. The coast has been inundated over time, with sea levels having risen from a minimum of 115–120 m (377–394 ft) lower than today at the Last Glacial Maximum (LGM) to its current level at 4,000 years BP.

The coastal shelf created by sedimentation during that time remains below the surface. It was never very extensive on the Atlantic side, as the continental shelf drops rather steeply into the depths. An estimated 700 km (430 mi) length of Atlantic shelf is only 10–65 km (6.2–40.4 mi) wide. At the 500 m (1,600 ft) isobath, on the edge, the shelf drops off to 1,000 m (3,300 ft).

The submarine topography of the coastal waters of the Iberian Peninsula has been studied extensively in the process of drilling for oil. Ultimately, the shelf drops into the Bay of Biscay on the north (an abyss), the Iberian abyssal plain at 4,800 m (15,700 ft) on the west, and Tagus abyssal plain to the south. In the north, between the continental shelf and the abyss, is an extension called the Galicia Bank, a plateau that contains the Porto, Vigo, and Vasco da Gama seamounts, which form the Galicia interior basin. The southern border of these features is marked by Nazaré Canyon, which splits the continental shelf and leads directly into the abyss.

=== Rivers ===
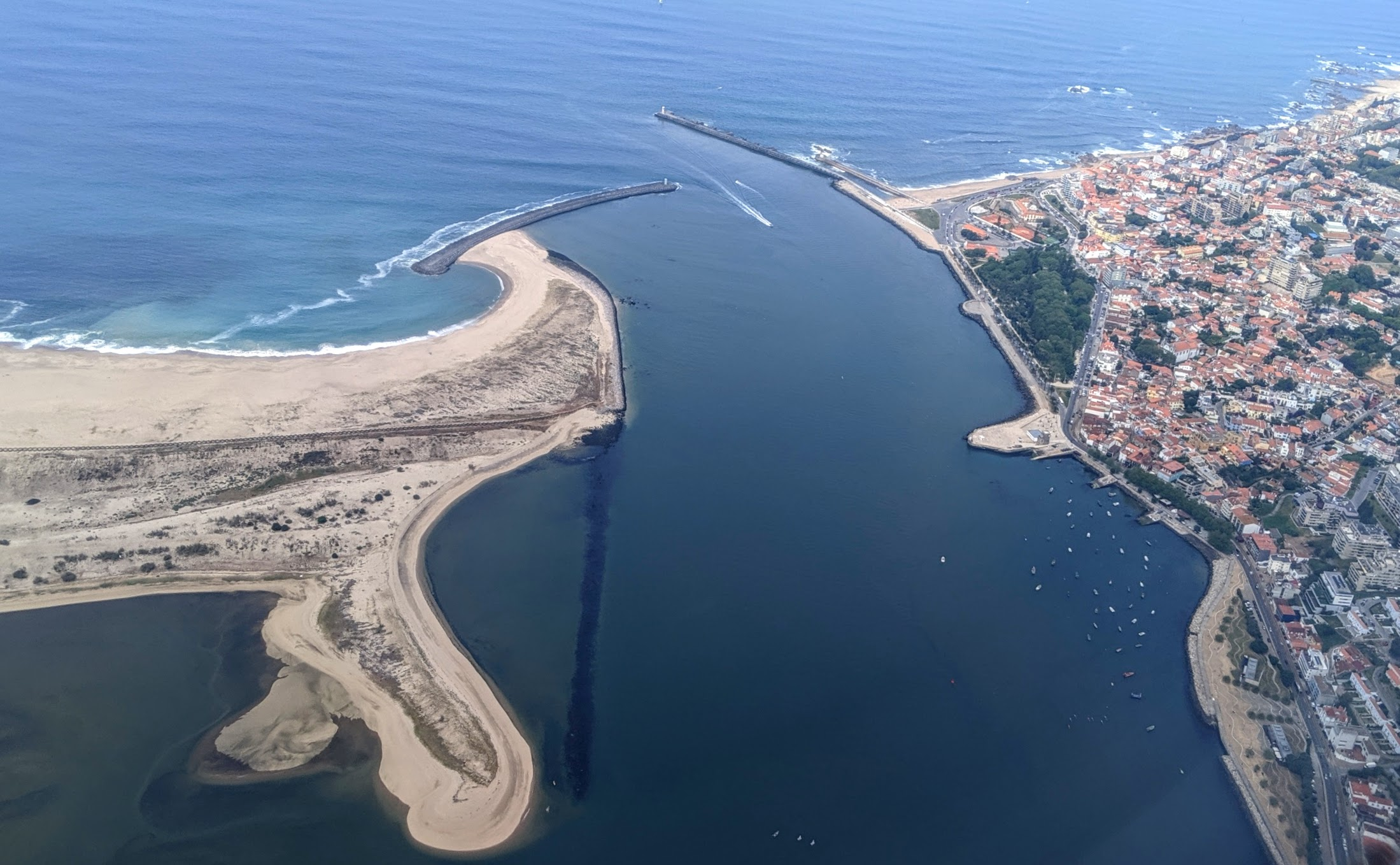
Discharge of the Douro into the Atlantic Ocean near Porto

The major rivers flow through the wide valleys between the mountain systems. These are the Ebro, Douro, Tagus, Guadiana and Guadalquivir. All rivers in the Iberian Peninsula are subject to seasonal variations in flow.

The Tagus is the longest river on the peninsula and, like the Douro, flows westwards with its lower course in Portugal. The Guadiana river bends southwards and forms the border between Spain and Portugal in the last stretch of its course.

=== Mountains ===
The terrain of the Iberian Peninsula is largely mountainous. The major mountain systems are:

- The Pyrenees and their foothills, the Pre-Pyrenees, crossing the isthmus of the peninsula so completely as to allow no passage except by mountain road, trail, coastal road or tunnel. Aneto in the Maladeta massif, at 3,404 m, is the highest point

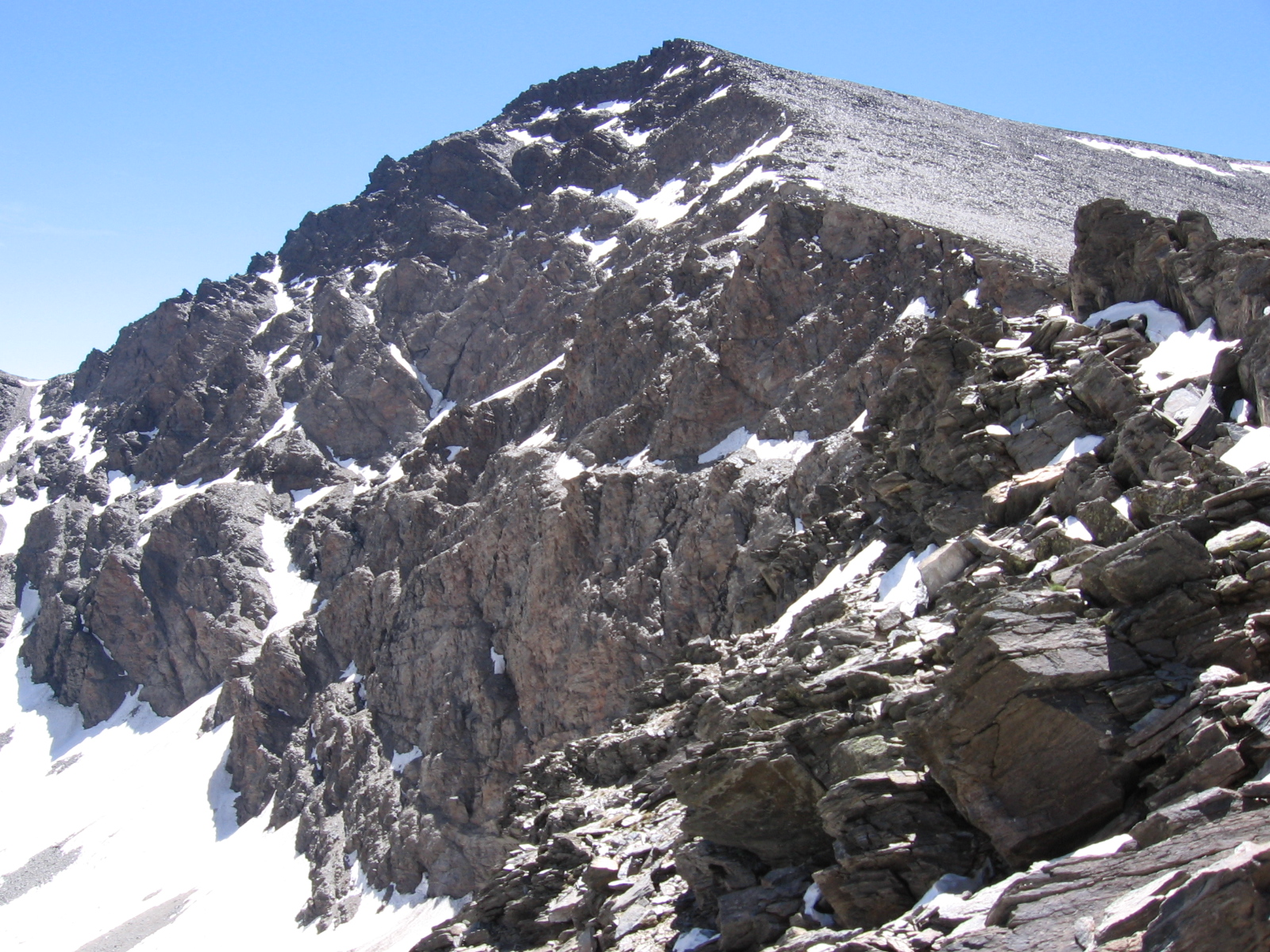
The Mulhacén, the highest peak in the Iberian Peninsula

- The Cantabrian Mountains along the northern coast with the massive Picos de Europa. Torre de Cerredo, at 2,648 m, is the highest point
- The Galicia/Trás-os-Montes Massif in the Northwest is made up of very old heavily eroded rocks. Pena Trevinca, at 2,127 m, is the highest point
- The Sistema Ibérico, a complex system at the heart of the peninsula, in its central/eastern region. It contains a great number of ranges and divides the watershed of the Tagus, Douro and Ebro rivers. Moncayo, at 2,313 m, is the highest point
- The Sistema Central, dividing the Iberian Plateau into a northern and a southern half and stretching into Portugal (where the highest point of Continental Portugal (1,993 m) is located in the Serra da Estrela). Pico Almanzor in the Sierra de Gredos is the highest point, at 2,592 m
- The Montes de Toledo, which also stretches into Portugal from the La Mancha natural region at the eastern end. Its highest point, at 1,603 m, is La Villuerca in the Sierra de Villuercas, Extremadura
- The Sierra Morena, which divides the watershed of the Guadiana and Guadalquivir rivers. At 1,332 m, Bañuela is the highest point
- The Baetic System, which stretches between Cádiz and Gibraltar and northeast towards Alicante Province. It is divided into three subsystems:
  - Prebaetic System, which begins west of the Sierra Sur de Jaén, reaching the Mediterranean Sea shores in Alicante Province. La Sagra is the highest point at 2,382 m.
  - Subbaetic System, which is in a central position within the Baetic Systems, stretching from Cape Trafalgar in Cádiz Province across Andalusia to the Region of Murcia. The highest point, at 2,027 m (6,650 ft), is Peña de la Cruz in Sierra Arana.
  - Penibaetic System, located in the far southeastern area stretching between Gibraltar across the Mediterranean coastal Andalusian provinces. It includes the highest point in the peninsula, the 3,478 m high Mulhacén in the Sierra Nevada.

=== Geology ===
Major Geologic Units of the Iberian Peninsula

The Iberian Peninsula contains rocks of every geological period from the Ediacaran to the Recent, and almost every kind of rock is represented. World-class mineral deposits can be found there. The core of the Iberian Peninsula consists of a Hercynian cratonic block known as the Iberian Massif. On the northeast, this is bounded by the Pyrenean fold belt, and on the southeast it is bounded by the Baetic System. These twofold chains are part of the Alpine belt.

To the west, the peninsula is delimited by the continental boundary formed by the magma-poor opening of the Atlantic Ocean. The Hercynian Foldbelt is mostly buried by Mesozoic and Tertiary cover rocks to the east, and outcrops through the Sistema Ibérico and the Catalan Mediterranean System.

The Iberian Peninsula features one of the largest lithium deposits belts in Europe, an otherwise relatively scarce resource in the continent, scattered along the Iberian Massif's Central Iberian Zone and Galicia Tras-Os-Montes Zone. Also in the Iberian Massif, and similarly to other Hercynian blocks in Europe, the peninsula hosts some uranium deposits, largely located in the Central Iberian Zone unit.

The Iberian Pyrite Belt, located in the SW quadrant of the Peninsula, ranks among the most important volcanogenic massive sulphide districts on Earth, and it has been exploited for millennia.

=== Climate ===
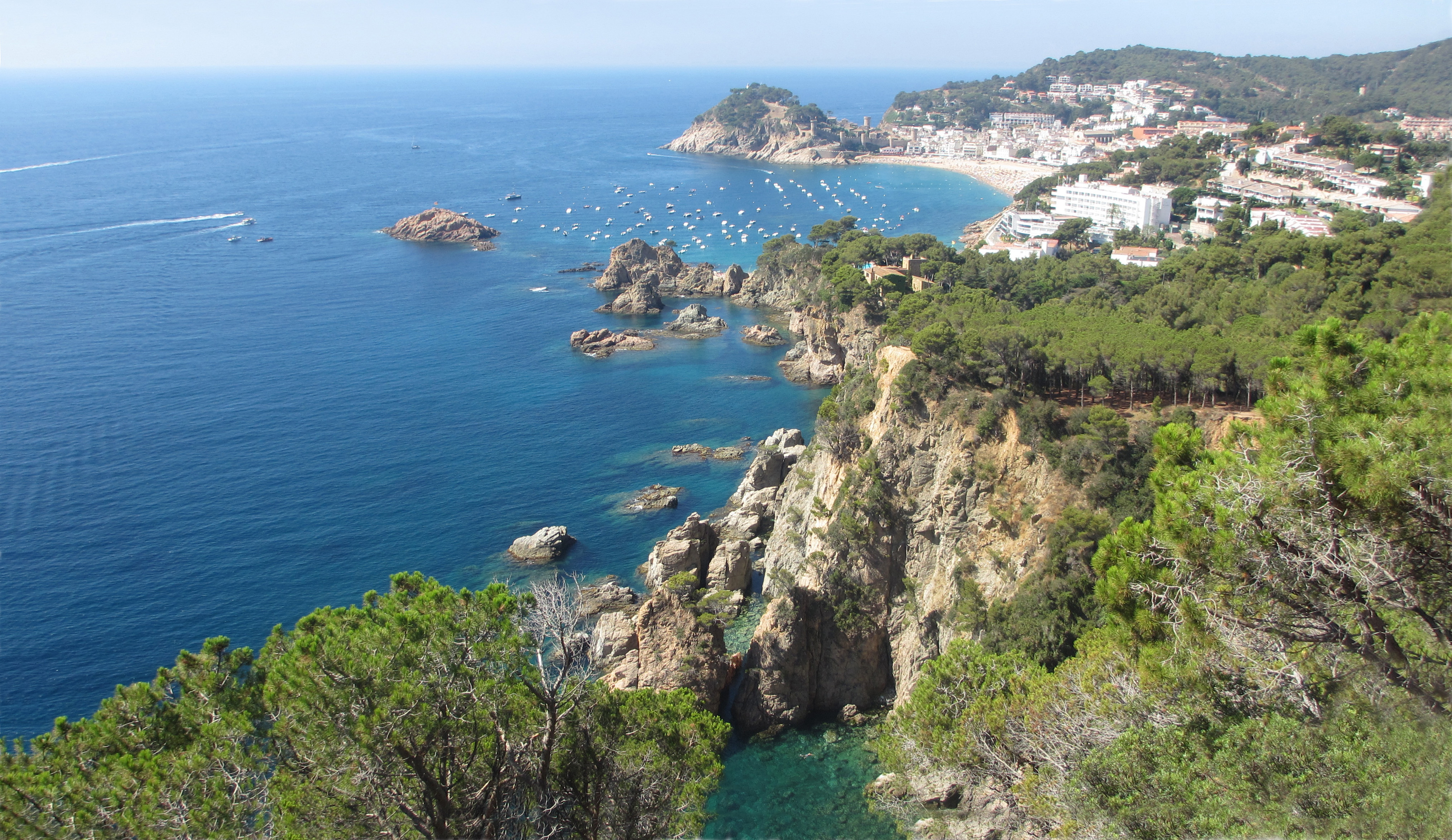
The Mediterranean coast of Spain

The Iberian Peninsula's location and topography, as well as the effects of large atmospheric circulation patterns induce a NW to SE gradient of yearly precipitation, roughly from 2,000 mm to 300 mm.

The Iberian Peninsula has three dominant climate types. One of these is the oceanic climate seen in the northeast, in which precipitation has barely any difference between winter and summer. Most of Portugal and Spain have a Mediterranean climate. The warm-summer Mediterranean climate and the hot-summer Mediterranean climate, with differences in precipitation and temperature depending on latitude and position versus the sea. This applies greatly to the Portuguese and Galician Atlantic coasts where, due to upwelling/downwelling phenomena, average temperatures in summer can vary by as much as 10 °C (18 °F) in only a few kilometers. For example, Peniche vs Santarém.

There are more localized steppe climates in central Spain, with temperatures resembling a more continental Mediterranean climate. In other extreme cases, there are highland alpine climates such as in Sierra Nevada. There are areas with extremely low precipitation and desert climates or semi-desert climates, such as the Almería area, Murcia area and southern Alicante area.

In the southwestern interior of the Iberian Peninsula the hottest temperatures in Europe are found, with Córdoba averaging around 37 °C (99 °F) in July and August. The Spanish Mediterranean coast usually averages around 30 °C (86 °F) in summer. In sharp contrast A Coruña at the northern tip of Galicia has a summer daytime high average at just below 23 °C (73 °F).

This cool and wet summer climate is replicated throughout most of the northern coastline. Winters in the Peninsula are for the most part, mild, although frosts are common in higher altitude areas of central Spain. The warmest winter nights are usually found in downwelling favourable areas of the west coast, such as on capes. Precipitation varies greatly between regions on the Peninsula, in December for example the northern west coast averages above 200 mm (7.9 in) whereas the southeast can average below 30 mm (1.2 in). Insolation can vary from just 1,600 hours in the Bilbao area, to above 3,000 hours in the Algarve and Gulf of Cádiz.

== Political divisions ==
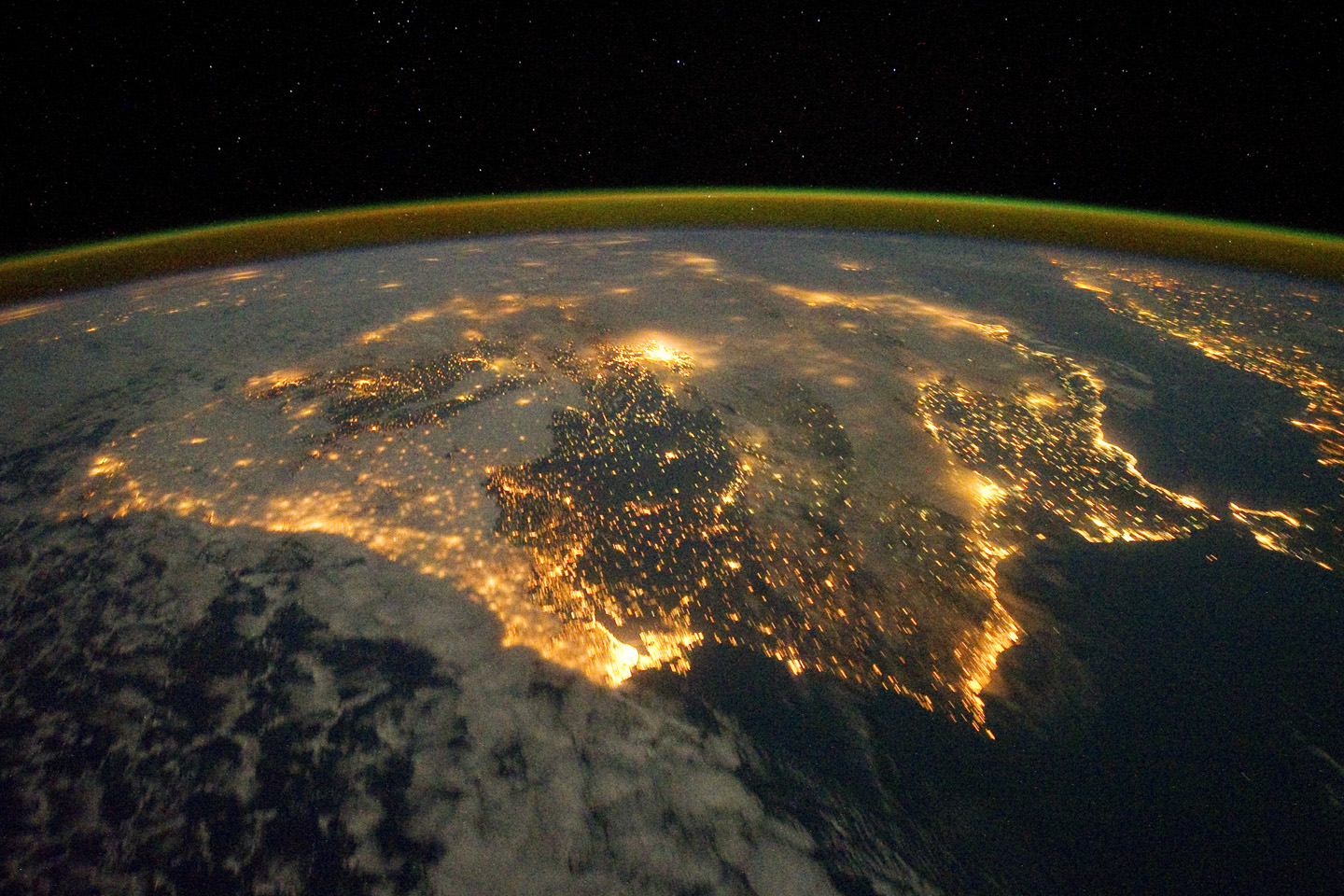
Satellite image of Iberia at night

The current political configuration of the Iberian Peninsula comprises the bulk of Portugal and Spain, the whole landlocked microstate of Andorra, a small part of the French department of Pyrénées-Orientales (French Cerdagne), and the British Overseas Territory of Gibraltar.

French Cerdagne is on the south side of the Pyrenees mountain range, which runs along the border between France and Spain. For example, the Segre river, which runs west and then south to meet the Ebro, has its source on the French side. The Pyrenees range is often considered the northeastern boundary of Iberian Peninsula, although the French coastline curves away from the rest of Europe north of the range, which is the reason why Perpignan, which is also known as the capital of Northern Catalonia, is often considered as the entrance to the Iberian Peninsula.

Regarding Portugal and Spain, this chiefly excludes the Macaronesian archipelagos (the Azores and Madeira of Portugal, and the Canary Islands of Spain), the Balearic Islands (Spain), and the Spanish territories in North Africa (most conspicuously the cities of Ceuta and Melilla, as well as uninhabited islets and rocks).

The countries and territories on the Iberian Peninsula:

Arms	Flag	Country / Territory	Capital	Area (mainland)	% of area	Population (mainland)	% of population	Density (people/km^{2})
Andorra	Flag of Andorra	Andorra	Andorra la Vella	468 km^{2} (181 sq mi)	0.080	85,863	0.154	183.47
Pyrénées-Orientales	Flag of Pyrénées-Orientales	French Cerdagne (France)	Font-Romeu-Odeillo-Via	539 km^{2} (208 sq mi)	0.092	12,035	0.022	22.33
Gibraltar	Flag of Gibraltar	Gibraltar (United Kingdom)	Gibraltar	7 km^{2} (2.7 sq mi)	0.001	32,688	0.059	4,669.71
Portugal	Flag of Portugal	Portugal (mainland)	Lisbon	89,015 km^{2} (34,369 sq mi)	15.254	10,248,477	18.372	115.13
Spain	Flag of Spain	Spain (mainland)	Madrid	493,515 km^{2} (190,547 sq mi)	84.572	45,404,858	81.394	92.00
Total				583,544 km^{2} (225,308 sq mi)	100.000	55,783,921	100.000	95.60

== Cities ==
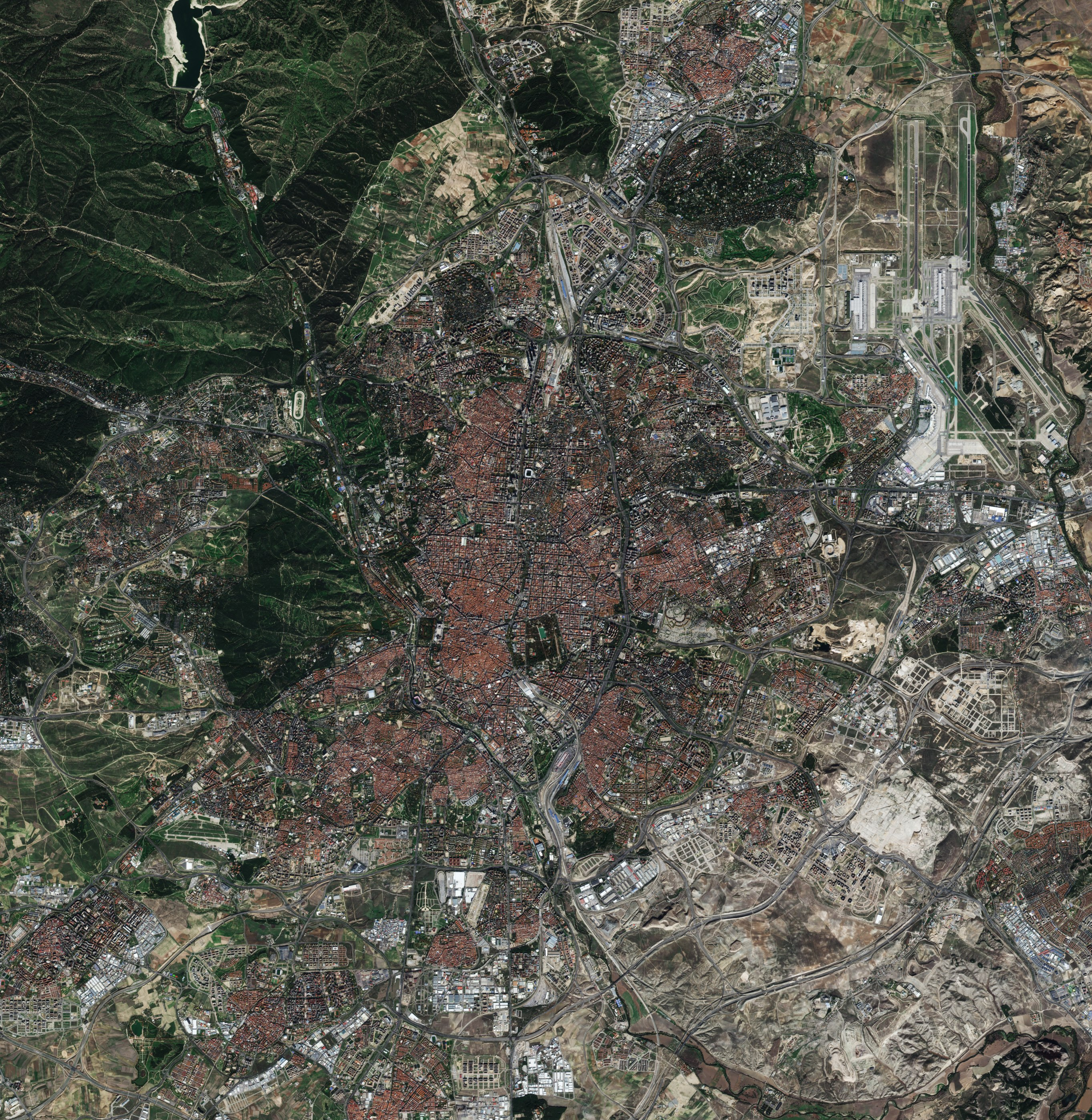
Madrid

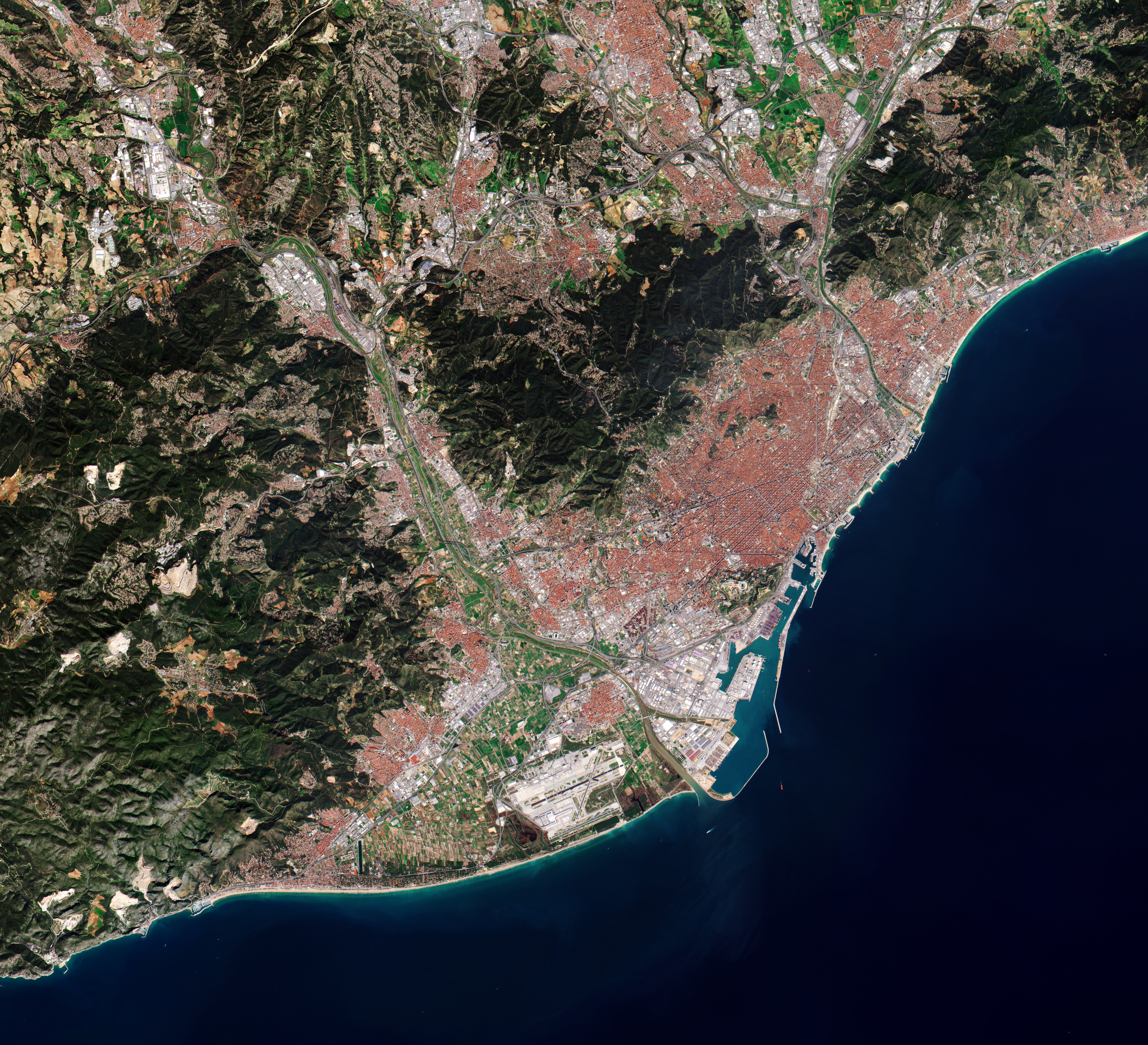
Barcelona

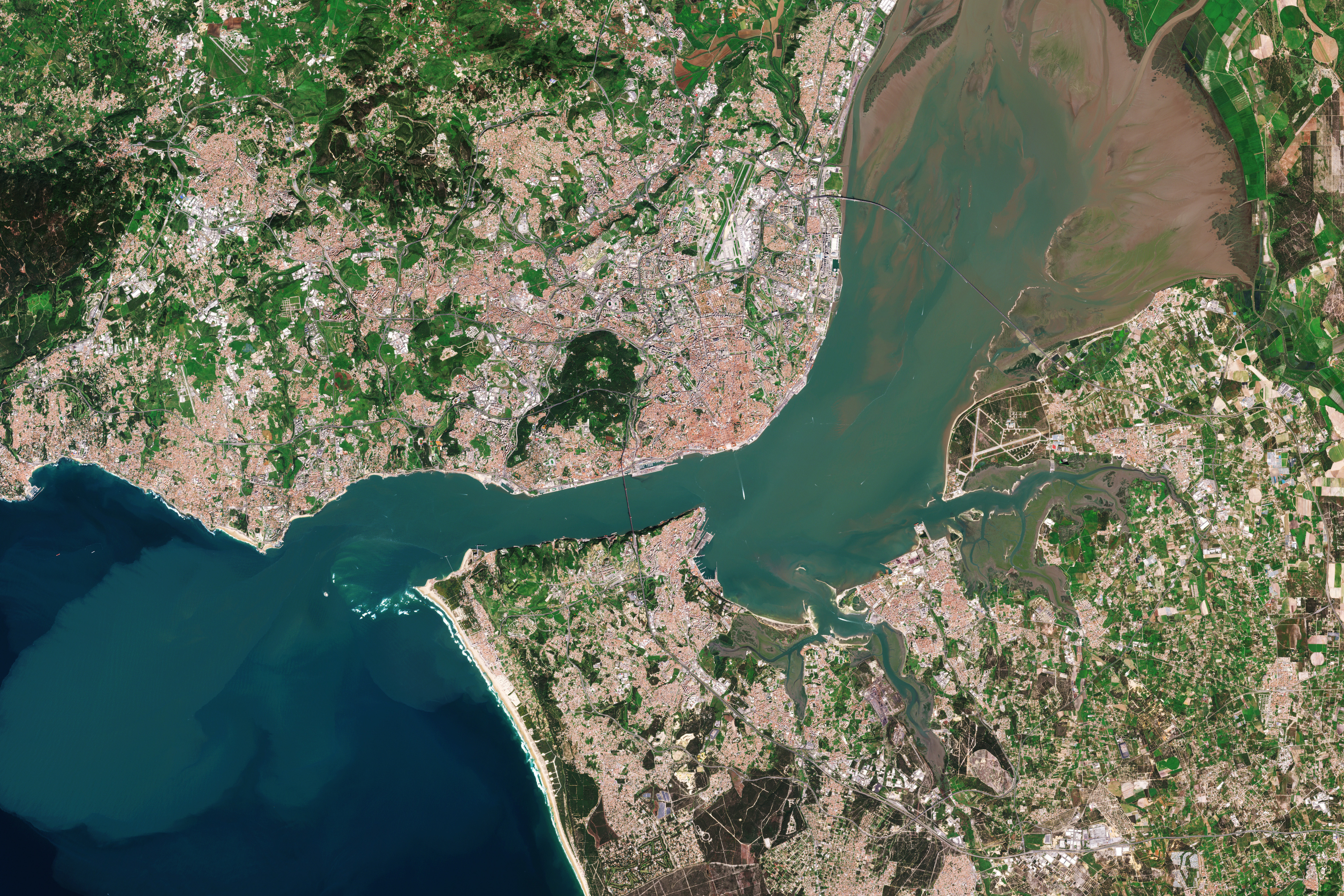
Lisbon

The Iberian city network is dominated by three international metropolises (Barcelona, Lisbon, and Madrid) and four regional metropolises (Bilbao, Porto, Seville, and Valencia). The relatively weak integration of the network favours a competitive approach vis-à-vis the inter-relation between the different centres. Among these metropolises, Madrid stands out within the global urban hierarchy in terms of its status as a major service centre and enjoys the greatest degree of connectivity.

=== Major metropolitan regions ===
According to Eurostat (2019), the metropolitan regions with a population over one million are listed as follows:

Metropolitan region	State	Population (2019)
Madrid	Spain	6,641,649
Barcelona	Spain	5,575,204
Lisbon	Portugal	2,846,332
Valencia	Spain	2,540,588
Seville	Spain	1,949,640
Alicante-Elche-Elda	Spain	1,862,780
Porto	Portugal	1,722,374
Málaga-Marbella	Spain	1,660,985
Murcia-Cartagena	Spain	1,487,663
Cádiz	Spain	1,249,739
Bilbao	Spain	1,137,191
Oviedo-Gijón	Spain	1,022,205

== Ecology ==
=== Forests ===
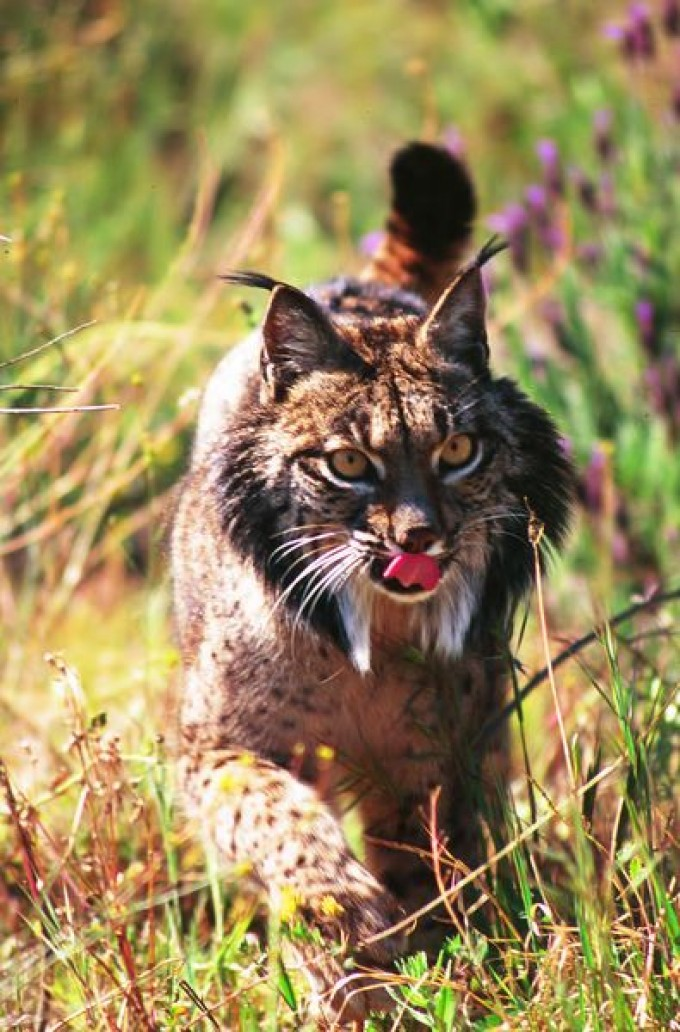
An Iberian lynx

The woodlands of the Iberian Peninsula are distinct ecosystems. Although the various regions are each characterized by distinct vegetation, there are some similarities across the peninsula.

While the borders between these regions are not clearly defined, there is a mutual influence that makes it very hard to establish boundaries and some species find their optimal habitat in the intermediate areas.

The endangered Iberian lynx (Lynx pardinus) is a symbol of the Iberian mediterranean forest and of the fauna of the Iberian Peninsula altogether. Many species are almost if not completely endemic to the peninsula including Iberian ibex, European rabbit, Pyrenean desman, Spanish eagle, Iberian green woodpecker and Iberian magpie.

A new Podarcis lizard species, Podarcis virescens, was accepted as a species by the Taxonomic Committee of the Societas Europaea Herpetologica in 2020. This lizard is native to the Iberian Peninsula and found near rivers in the region.

=== East Atlantic flyway ===
The Iberian Peninsula is an important stopover on the East Atlantic flyway for birds migrating from northern Europe to Africa. For example, curlew sandpipers rest in the region of the Bay of Cádiz.

In addition to the birds migrating through, some seven million wading birds from the north spend the winter in the estuaries and wetlands of the Iberian Peninsula, mainly at locations on the Atlantic coast. In Galicia are Ría de Arousa (a home of grey plover), Ria de Ortigueira, Ria de Corme and Ria de Laxe. In Portugal, the Aveiro Lagoon hosts pied avocet, the common ringed plover, grey plover and little stint. Ribatejo Province on the Tagus supports pied avocet, grey plover, dunlin, bar-tailed godwit and common redshank.

The Sado Estuary holds dunlin, Eurasian curlew, grey plover and common redshank. The Algarve hosts red knot, common greenshank and turnstone. The Guadalquivir Marshes region of Andalusia and the Salinas de Cádiz are especially rich in wintering wading birds: Kentish plover, common ringed plover, sanderling, and black-tailed godwit in addition to the others. The Ebro delta is home to all the species mentioned above.

== Languages ==
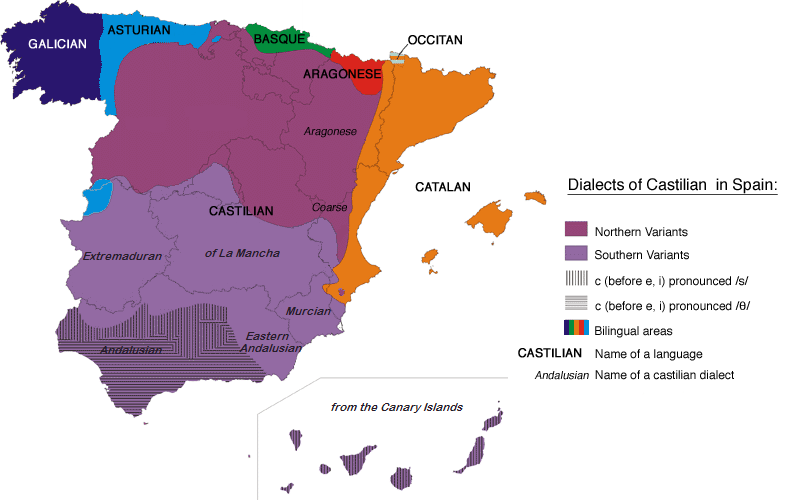
A map of languages and dialects in Spain.

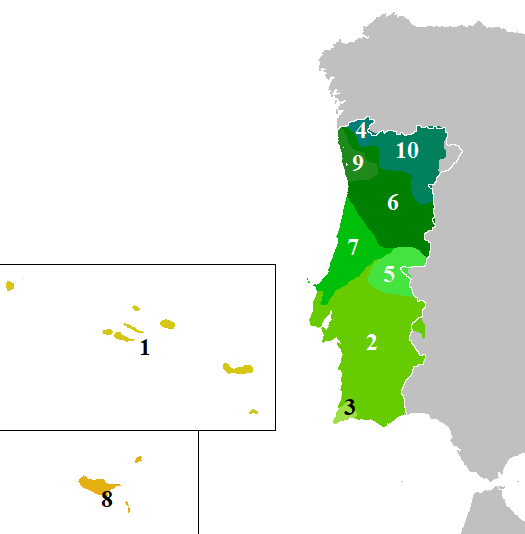
A map of dialects in Portugal.

With the sole exception of Basque, which is of unknown origin, all modern Iberian languages descend from Vulgar Latin and belong to the Western Romance languages. Throughout history and pre-history, many different languages have been spoken in the Iberian Peninsula, contributing to the formation and differentiation of the contemporaneous languages of Iberia. Most of them have become extinct or fallen into disuse. Basque is the only non-Indo-European surviving language in Iberia and Western Europe.

In modern times, Spanish (the official language of Spain, spoken by the entire 45 million population in the country, the native language of about 36 million in Europe), Portuguese (the official language of Portugal, with a population over 10 million), Catalan (over 7 million speakers in Europe, 3.4 million with Catalan as first language), Galician (understood by the 93% of the 2.8 million Galician population) and Basque (cf. around 1 million speakers) are the most widely spoken languages in the Iberian Peninsula. Spanish and Portuguese have expanded beyond Iberia to the rest of world, becoming global languages.

Other minority romance languages with some degree of recognition, include the several varieties of Astur-leonese, collectively amounting to about 0.6 million speakers, and Aragonese (spoken by barely 8% of the 130,000 people inhabiting the Alto Aragón).

English is the official language of Gibraltar. Llanito is a unique language in the territory, an amalgamation of mostly English and Spanish. In Spain in 2019, 54.3% could speak a foreign language, below that of the EU-28 average. Portugal meanwhile achieved 69%, above the EU average, but still below the EU median. Spain ranks 25th out of 33 European countries in the English Proficiency Index.

== Transportation ==
Both Spain and Portugal have traditionally used a non-standard rail gauge (the 1,668 mm Iberian gauge) since the construction of the first railroads in the 19th century. Spain has progressively introduced the 1,435 mm standard gauge in its new high-speed rail network (one of the most extensive in the world), inaugurated in 1992 with the Madrid–Seville line, followed to name a few by the Madrid–Barcelona (2008), Madrid–Valencia (2010), an Alicante branch of the latter (2013) and the connection to France of the Barcelona line. Portugal however suspended all the high-speed rail projects in the wake of the 2008 financial crisis, putting an end for the time being to the possibility of a high-speed rail connection between Lisbon, Porto and Madrid.

Handicapped by the Pyrenees mountain range hindering the connection to the rest of Europe, Spain and subsidiarily Portugal only have two meaningful rail connections to France able for freight transport, located at both ends of the mountain range. An international rail line across the Central Pyrenees linking Zaragoza and the French city of Pau through a tunnel existed in the past. An accident in the French part destroyed a stretch of the railroad in 1970 and the Canfranc Station has been a cul-de-sac since then.

There are four points connecting the Portuguese and Spanish rail networks: Valença do Minho–Tui, Vilar Formoso–Fuentes de Oñoro, Marvão-Beirã–Valencia de Alcántara and Elvas–Badajoz.

The prospect of the development (as part of a European-wide effort) of the Central, Mediterranean and Atlantic rail corridors is expected to be a way to improve the competitiveness of the ports of Tarragona, Valencia, Sagunto, Bilbao, Santander, Sines and Algeciras vis-à-vis the rest of Europe and the World.

In 1980, Morocco and Spain started a joint study on the feasibility of a fixed link (tunnel or bridge) across the Strait of Gibraltar, possibly through a connection of Punta Paloma with Cape Malabata. Years of studies have made no real progress thus far.

A transit point for many submarine cables, the Fibre-optic Link Around the Globe, Europe India Gateway, and the SEA-ME-WE 3 feature landing stations in the Iberian Peninsula. The West Africa Cable System, Main One, SAT-3/WASC, Africa Coast to Europe also land in Portugal. MAREA, a high capacity communication transatlantic cable, connects the north of the Iberian Peninsula (Bilbao) to North America (Virginia), whereas Grace Hopper is an upcoming cable connecting the Iberian Peninsula (Bilbao) to the UK and the US intended to be operative by 2022. EllaLink is an upcoming high-capacity communication cable expected to connect the Peninsula (Sines) to South America and the mammoth 2Africa project intends to connect the peninsula to the United Kingdom, Europe and Africa via Portugal and Barcelona by 2023–24.

Two gas pipelines: the Pedro Duran Farell pipeline and more recently the Medgaz from, respectively, Morocco and Algeria link the Maghreb and the Iberian Peninsula, providing Spain with Algerian natural gas. The contract for the first pipeline expires on 31 October 2021 and—amidst a tense climate of Algerian–Moroccan relations—there are no plans to renew it.

== Economy ==
The official currency across Iberia is the Euro, with the exception of Gibraltar, which uses the Gibraltar Pound (at parity with Sterling).

Major industries include mining, tourism, small farms, and fishing. Because the coast is so long, fishing is popular, especially sardines, tuna and anchovies. Commodities mined include iron, gold, coal, lead, silver, zinc, quicksilver, and salt.

Regarding their role in the global economy, both the microstate of Andorra and the British Overseas Territory of Gibraltar have been described as tax havens.

The Galician region of Spain, in the north-west of the Iberian Peninsula, became one of the biggest entry points of cocaine in Europe, on a par with the Dutch ports. Hashish is smuggled from Morocco via the Strait of Gibraltar.

== See also ==
- Iberism
- 2025 Iberian Peninsula blackout
- Genetic history of the Iberian Peninsula
