= Anglo-Portuguese News =

English-language newspaper in Portugal (1937-2004)

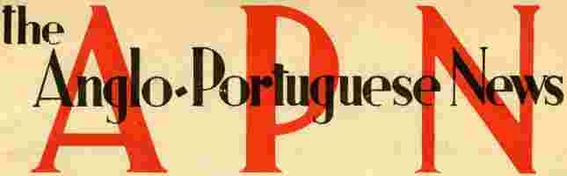
- Type: Weekly or fortnightly newspaper
- Format: Various
- Owner: Various
- Editor: Luiz Artur de Oliveira Marques (1937-76); Susan Lowndes Marques (1976-80); Nigel Batley (1980-2004)
- Founded: 20 February 1937
- Ceased publication: 19 February 2004
- Country: Portugal
- Circulation: 8,500 (as of 1992)
- Website: https://angloportuguesenews.cascais.pt/

The Anglo-Portuguese News (APN) was an English-language paper aimed mainly at the British community in Portugal. First published in February 1937, it also served as a propaganda tool for the British government during World War Two, when Portugal was neutral, and when the paper was described by the Germans as "the voice of Churchill in Lisbon". For much of its life the APN was run by a Portuguese, Luiz Marques, and his British wife, Susan Lowndes Marques. In 1980 it was sold to a British journalist, Nigel Batley, who managed the paper until 2004 when it suddenly closed. Published mainly fortnightly during the Marques era, it became a weekly under Batley, reaching sales of up to 8,500 per issue.

== Beginnings ==
There had been many attempts to publish English-language newspapers in Portugal, particularly Lisbon, going back to 1830. However, they tended not to last more than a few issues. Nevertheless, Charles Eric Wakeham, a retired British Cavalry Officer who had moved to Portugal for his health and had become the Lisbon correspondent of The Times, thought he could succeed where others had failed. The first issue of the APN was published on 20 February 1937. Luiz Marques, who had been educated in England for twelve years and also worked there as the London correspondent of the Diário de Notícias, became editor, as papers could not be published in Portugal with a foreign editor. Wakeham returned to the UK soon after the beginning of World War II, to be director of the BBC Monitoring Service at Caversham Park. He was succeeded as director of the paper by Walter Lucas and then Douglas Brown, both also correspondents of The Times, with ownership being transferred to the Jornal do Comércio. In 1954, Marques bought the APN from that newspaper, for a nominal sum.

Marques met Susan Lowndes in Portugal in August 1938. They married in December 1938 in Westminster Cathedral in London. Initially living in Lisbon, they made their home in Monte Estoril from 1947. Their house doubled as the APN office. Lowndes came from a prominent family of writers, which would serve the paper well in subsequent years.

== Early years ==
During World War II, the couple worked on the paper and assisted the British Embassy by reviewing the Portuguese press for items of interest to the British military and by carrying out translations. Marques was also the Lisbon correspondent for the Daily Telegraph and New York Times. Intended to be published only in English, during the war the APN received financial support from the British Government to publish pages in Portuguese and to be issued weekly rather than the original fortnightly. It was subject to criticism by the Germans and, as a result, the couple was on the embassy's list of people to be evacuated should the Germans invade Lisbon.

The subsidy ended in early 1946 and the paper returned to being fortnightly. Apart from one regular page that continued until 1949, the pages in Portuguese ceased at the end of 1945. The APN's financial situation was then precarious and Marques sought help from the British community by encouraging them to take out subscriptions and asking British-owned companies to place advertisements in the paper. The Portuguese government at the time was the right-wing dictatorship known as the Estado Novo. The APN was generally pro-Government in its approach, even when considering its need to comply with the requirements of the dictatorship's censors.

Copy of issue in August 1981

== Contributors in the early years ==
Although they wrote much of the paper themselves, often using pseudonyms (with the couple's cat "Sabina" being the shopping correspondent) or publishing anonymously, Marques and Lowndes were also able to call on an impressive list of contributors, in many cases drawing on the connections of Lowndes in London. Contributors included the Porto-based Anglo-French historian, Elaine Sanceau; the diplomat and author, Marcus Cheke, who was attached to the British embassy during World War Two and was later the British Minister to the Holy See; the British politician, Harold Nicolson, best known for being married to Vita Sackville-West; the historian, Edgar Prestage, who was considered to be Britain's leading authority on Portugal; and Rose Macaulay, best known outside Portugal for her work The Towers of Trebizond but inside Portugal for her book They Went to Portugal. Between 1945 and 1947 Lowndes was able to obtain contributions from the novelist Ann Bridge, who was the wife of Owen O'Malley, the British Ambassador to Portugal. Bridge also collaborated with Lowndes on a travel guide on Portugal. Many long-time British residents also contributed. Marques was similarly able to call on his contacts in Portugal. Contributors to the Portuguese pages during the war included the Portuguese writer and activist, Maria Archer, the archaeologist and historian, Virgínia Rau; the Portuguese composer Luís de Freitas Branco; the actress and feminist, Manuela Porto; the writer and diplomat, Aquilino Ribeiro; and the writer, Vitorino Nemésio.

== Political changes ==
The Carnation Revolution of 25 April 1974 in Portugal overthrew the Estado Novo. While the APN acknowledged this, it did so largely by reproducing press releases of the incoming government and its successors. The paper provided no description of events in the streets of Portugal during and after the revolution or of the rivalries between the various left-wing factions competing for power. According to Lowndes the paper deliberately kept a low profile, limiting itself to publishing new regulations that could impact the expatriate community. The revolution was followed by the seizure of companies and farms, some of which were British owned. One consequence of this was that the paper's advertising revenue declined and the number of pages had to be reduced.

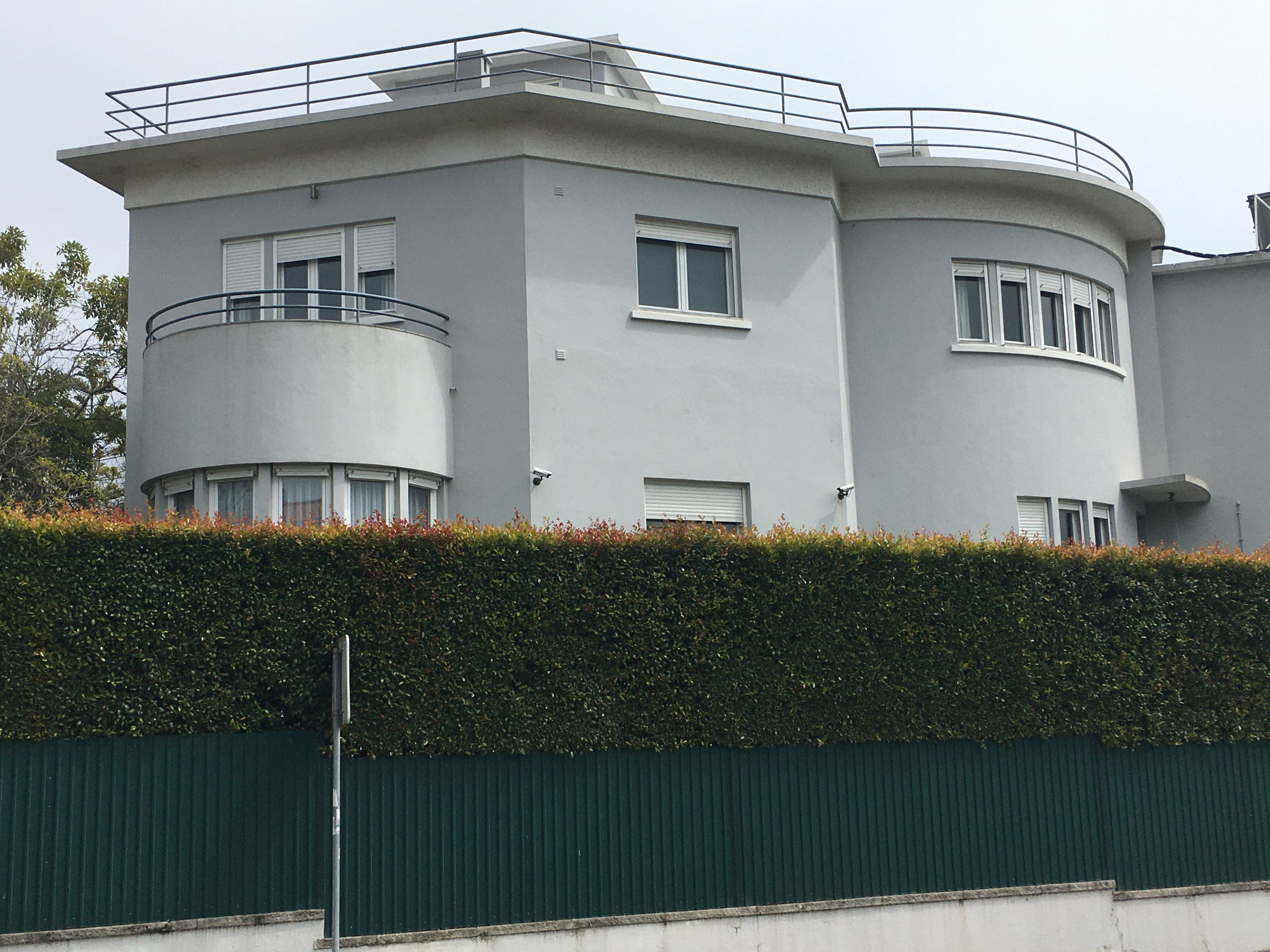
Building housing the office of the paper after Nigel Batley became owner

== Death of Marques and sale of the paper ==
Marques died on 1 October 1976. Lowndes took over the running of the paper but, by 1979, she had decided that she could not continue on her own. Following an advertisement placed in the British trade press the paper was purchased by Nigel Batley, a British journalist from Leamington Spa, who took control on 1 November 1980. The paper had previously been printed externally but from 1982 Batley operated his own printing presses, also doing contract printing for others.

Batley gave the paper a greater focus on news: under Marques and Lowndes it had had more of a magazine style. Special sections were introduced on the Algarve, Madeira and Porto as a way of extending readership to the British community in those locations, and a weekly guide to Portuguese property was introduced, attracting considerable advertising. In November 1986, he changed the paper from being fortnightly to weekly, and gradually increased the average number of pages. Circulation increased from 1,800 when Batley bought the paper to 5,000 in 1986 and 8,500 in 1992. A Golden Jubilee Commemorative Souvenir, with a lengthy article by Lowndes, was published on 20 February 1987 and a dinner was held with speakers including Lowndes. A Diamond Anniversary party was held in November 1997 with speeches by Batley, the British Ambassador, Roger Westbrook, and the son of Marques and Lowndes, Paulo Lowndes Marques.

Batley also succeeded in attracting a talented team of staff and freelance contributors. They included Gerald Luckhurst, the gardening correspondent, who would be responsible for restoring the gardens of Monserrate Palace in Sintra and Barry Hatton, deputy editor from 1987 to 1992, who would later become the Associated Press correspondent in Portugal and publish two books on the country, The Portuguese and Queen of the Sea, about Lisbon. Lowndes continued to contribute articles, which was appreciated by Batley who felt this offered continuity and was also an endorsement of the changes he had been making.

Batley continued to produce the APN until 2004. The final issue was published on 19 February 2004. No mention was made of the impending closure but staff had been aware that the paper was facing financial difficulties. Four days later, a one-page notice in English and Portuguese was sent out, stating that the paper had temporarily suspended publication pending restructuring. APN - Publicações, Lda was declared insolvent on 11 April 2005.

== A historical record ==
Even while it was being published there was an awareness that the issues of the paper were creating a valuable historical record of the life of British residents in Portugal. After the death of Marques, a friend, Lloyd McCune, collected several complete sets of the first 40 years of the paper from the basement of the family home in Monte Estoril, and sent one to the Library of Congress in the US to be microfilmed. Other institutions received copies of the microfilms, including the British Library and Oxford and Cambridge universities. In 1985, an Index of the first 40 years (1937–77) of the APN was published by McCune and Guy J. Riccio of the US Naval Academy, with support from the Tinker Foundation of New York and the Calouste Gulbenkian Foundation in Lisbon. In 2024, a grandson of Marques and Lowndes, working with the British Historical Society of Portugal, made all copies of the paper available online.
