= Luiz Marques =

Portuguese journalist (1898–1976)

Luiz Artur de Oliveira Marques
- Marques in 1958
- Born: 25 November 1898; Alcântara, Lisbon, Portugal
- Died: 1 October 1976 (aged 77); Estoril, Portugal
- Occupations: Journalist and proprietor of the Anglo-Portuguese News
- Spouse: Susan Lowndes Marques
- Children: 3, including Paulo Lowndes Marques and Ana Vicente
- Relatives: A. H. de Oliveira Marques, nephew

Luiz Artur de Oliveira Marques (1898–1976) was the editor of the Anglo-Portuguese News (APN), based in Lisbon and, later, Monte Estoril, Portugal from 1937, and also owner of the paper from 1954 until his death.

== Early life ==
Marques was born on 25 November 1898 in Alcântara, a parish in the Portuguese capital of Lisbon. He was the oldest child of Jayme Arthur Marques, a consulting engineer and of Ema Oliveira Marques. His father, a strong Anglophile who had studied engineering as an apprentice in Leith, Scotland and had then attended classes in Manchester, was keen that his children should be educated in English and in the United Kingdom. Marques first went to an English school in Lisbon and then, at the age of twelve, was sent to Penketh School in Warrington in Lancashire, a non-denominational, co-educational boarding school established by the Society of Friends in 1834. There, he founded and largely wrote the school magazine, The Penketh Trumpet. In 1913 he moved to Rossall School near Fleetwood, also in Lancashire, sometimes referred to as the "Eton of the North".He was on holiday in Portugal at the beginning of World War I in July 1914 and did not return.

Marques returned to England in 1919, entering the City and Guilds College, now part of Imperial College London, with the intention of following in his father's footsteps as an engineer. He stayed in many different parts of London, mainly in the west of the city, including Maida Vale, Bloomsbury and Bayswater and took up rowing on the River Thames, although with little success. Following the collapse of the Portuguese currency, his parents were unable to pay his expenses, so he obtained a job at the Anglo-Portuguese Colonial and Overseas Bank. He then became London correspondent for the Portuguese daily newspaper, the Diário de Notícias.

== Journalism career ==
Realising that he was not suited to banking, Marques returned to Portugal in 1932 and started to teach at the Liceu Pedro Nunes high school in Lisbon. He also worked as a translator and trained British ambassadors in Portuguese. The Anglo-Portuguese News was founded in 1937 by Charles Eric Wakeham but, as foreigners were not permitted to edit Portuguese newspapers, he asked Marques to become the editor. ln 1938, he met Susan Lowndes when she was visiting Estoril. Her father worked for The Times and her mother, Marie Belloc Lowndes, was a novelist who came from a distinguished literary family. They were married in December of the same year in Westminster Cathedral in London.

With the outbreak of World War II, Wakeham returned to England to head up the BBC Monitoring Service at Caversham Park, with ownership of the APN being transferred to the Jornal do Commercio. Marques remained as editor, increasing the size and frequency of the paper through a British government subsidy that enabled it to carry articles in both English and Portuguese; the latter for propaganda purposes. The APN was the only newspaper in the English language to be published on the continent of Europe throughout the war. In one German broadcast it was referred to as "Churchill’s mouthpiece in Lisbon", a title that gave Marques great pride. His wife was now also involved with the paper and both also worked with the British embassy. His name and that of Lowndes were on an embassy list of people to be evacuated should the Germans invade Portugal. Marques received an MBE for his translation work during the war.

Following the withdrawal of British subsidies after the war, it appeared likely that the APN would have to close as many of its readership had left Portugal during the war. However, Marques sought help from the British Community Council, a body that had coordinated the British community's support for the war effort. This responded by writing to British companies in Portugal, urging them to place advertisements in the paper, and to British residents, encouraging them to take out an annual subscription. The paper managed to continue publishing, albeit by returning to a fortnightly basis. Marques purchased the paper for a nominal sum in 1954. Gradually, it became very successful, in no small part due to the capacity of both Marques and Lowndes for hard work. Despite being able to call on a large number of distinguished writers to contribute columns, they both wrote much of the paper themselves, often using pseudonyms or publishing anonymously. Marques was described by Riccio and McCune as writing a "truly astonishing number of essays" on topics ranging "from travel to literary criticism, from politics to linguistics, from history to social commentary" as well as "a steady stream of excellent book reviews". Marques also worked as the Lisbon correspondent of the The Daily Telegraph, having started in this role before the war. He was one of the founders of the Foreign Press Association in Portugal.

== Family ==
Marques and Lowndes had three children: Paulo Lowndes Marques, a lawyer and politician, a founding member of the CDS – People's Party and Secretary of State for Foreign Affairs in Portugal; Ana Vicente, a leading supporter of women's rights and an author, including of children's books, who also published a book about life with her parents; and Antonia Marques Leitão who married the Portuguese diplomat Rui Burnay Morales de Los Rios da Silva Leitão. Through his brother, Henrique António, Marques was the uncle of the Portuguese historian, A. H. de Oliveira Marques.

== Death ==
Marques suffered from the crippling effects of spondylitis, which left him completely hunched over in his later years. He also had sight problems. He died at his home and APN headquarters in Monte Estoril on 1 October 1976. He was buried at the Galiza Cemetery in Estoril after a Requiem Mass attended by hundreds of friends. In 1995, his son Paulo published a book of articles by Marques, entitled Contacts, Memoirs and Collected Pieces.
