= Susan Lowndes Marques =

British author and journalist living in Portugal

- Born: Susan Antonia Dorothea Priestley Lowndes; 15 February 1907; London, England
- Died: 3 February 1993 (aged 85); Lisbon, Portugal
- Occupations: Author, journalist
- Known for: Contributor to Anglo-Portuguese relations

Susan Antonia Dorothea Priestley Lowndes Marques OBE (15 February 1907 - 3 February 1993) was a writer and journalist who became a leading figure in the British community in Lisbon, Portugal.

== Family and early life ==
Generally known as Susan Lowndes, or Susan Lowndes Marques after her marriage to the Portuguese, Luís Marques, she was born into a distinguished family. Her great, great-grandfather was the British scientist and philosopher Joseph Priestley, who was credited with the discovery of oxygen. Her grandmother was Bessie Rayner Parkes, a prominent British feminist and champion of women's suffrage. Her mother, Marie Belloc Lowndes, was a well-known writer of crime novels and biographies, best known for her novel, The Lodger, based on Jack the Ripper, which sold over a million copies and was made into a film by Alfred Hitchcock in 1926. Her uncle was the poet and novelist Hilaire Belloc.

== Marriage and Lisbon ==
Brought up in inter-war London, Susan Lowndes was therefore always surrounded by books and met many writers who visited the family home. Her father, Frederick Lowndes, worked as an editor for The Times. She was educated at St Mary's Convent, Ascot. On leaving school she did voluntary work and, for a time, ran an antique shop in London. In August 1938 she went with her father for a brief holiday in Lisbon, where she met Luiz Artur de Oliveira Marques (1898-1976), an English-educated journalist. They were married in December of the same year in Westminster Cathedral in London and made their home in Lisbon, later moving to Monte Estoril.

Her husband was the editor (later owner) of the Anglo-Portuguese News, a newspaper targeted primarily at the British community in Portugal. She would carry on running it after his death until 1980. He was the Lisbon correspondent for the Daily Telegraph, the Sunday Times and the New York Times, as well as doing some English teaching. Writers remained at the centre of her life. Their son, Paulo Lowndes Marques, recalled visits to Lisbon from Evelyn Waugh, Cyril Connolly, Aldous Huxley and Graham Greene. Other visitors included Rose Macaulay, Angus Wilson and Sachaverell Sitwell.

== World War II ==
During World War 2, in addition to working on the Anglo-Portuguese News, Susan Lowndes Marques and her husband helped out at the Press section of the British Embassy, reviewing the Portuguese press for items of British interest. The Anglo-Portuguese News was the only British newspaper published in Continental Europe during the war and received support from the British Government. Luís was referred to by Joseph Goebbels as “a man to be destroyed” and in a German propaganda radio programme the paper was called “the voice of Churchill in Lisbon”. As a consequence, the couple was on the special embassy list for immediate evacuation should Portugal have been invaded and a large sum of cash was always kept at their house just in case. During the war they were also active in supporting the refugees who passed through Lisbon in large numbers.

== A writer ==
After the war, Lowndes, writing under her maiden name, collaborated with Ann Bridge, wife of the then British ambassador in Lisbon, Lord O'Malley, to publish The Selective Traveller in Portugal (1949), which became a classic in travel writing on Portugal. It involved the two authors in travelling throughout Portugal on poor roads in search of interesting places to recommend to potential visitors. She subsequently wrote Good Food from Spain and Portugal (1956) and Portugal: A Travellers' Guide (1982), as well as annually revising Fodor's Guide to Portugal. Lowndes also wrote two small books on Fatima for thousands of English-speaking pilgrims. She often gave lectures on Portuguese topics in Portugal and Britain. Together with her elder sister, Elizabeth, Countess of Iddesleigh, she edited The Diaries and Letters of Marie Belloc Lowndes (1971), which described the atmosphere of the interwar years in London. English Art in Portugal, written together with Alice Berkeley, was published posthumously in 1994.

== Children ==
Susan Lowndes and her husband had three children. Paulo Lowndes Marques (1941-2011) was a lawyer, historian, a founding member of the CDS – People's Party and Secretary of State for Foreign Affairs in Portugal. Ana Vicente (1943-2015) was a leading supporter of women's rights and an author, including of children's books. She also wrote about life with her parents and compiled some of the letters of her mother. Her sister, Antonia Marques Leitão (born 1946), married the Portuguese diplomat Rui Burnay Morales de Los Rios da Silva Leitão.

== Religious faith ==
Susan Lowndes was awarded an OBE in 1975 for services to the British community in Lisbon. Someone with strong Catholic beliefs, she was, at the time of her death, the Lisbon correspondent of the London-based Catholic Herald and of the US Catholic News Service. She attached great importance to charity, believing that Christianity was lived in solidarity with the most vulnerable people. Hundreds of letters of thanks in her archives attest to the assistance she gave others. She worked voluntarily at the British Hospital in Lisbon and at St. Julian's International School, among several other organizations. Towards the end of her life she established the British Retirement Home in São Pedro do Estoril for British people in Portugal who had fallen on hard times. She also had a very developed sense of humour. Two days before her death, when she was offered oxygen in the hospital, she referred back to her great, great-grandfather's discovery of oxygen, saying, “Dear Doctor Priestley”.
