= Paulo Lowndes Marques =

Portuguese politician, lawyer and historian

- Born: 21 August 1941; Lisbon, Portugal
- Died: 1 January 2011 (aged 69); Lisbon, Portugal
- Occupations: Lawyer, politician, diplomat and author
- Known for: Co-founder of CDS – People's Party political party; contributor to Anglo-Portuguese relations

Paulo Henrique Lowndes Marques (21 August 1941 – 1 January 2011) was a Portuguese politician, lawyer, author, historian and conservationist. He was a founder member of the CDS – People's Party and Secretary of State for Foreign Affairs in Portugal. With a Portuguese father and a British mother, he was an active promoter of Anglo-Portuguese relations.

== Early life ==
Lowndes Marques was the son of Luiz de Oliveira Marques (1898 -1976) and the British writer Susan Lowndes Marques (1907 - 1993). Luís de Oliveira Marques had been educated in Britain during World War I and had worked there after the war. Susan Lowndes was the daughter of the journalist Frederick Lowndes and the writer Marie Belloc Lowndes, granddaughter of Bessie Rayner Parkes, a prominent campaigner for women's rights, and niece of the author Hilaire Belloc. She travelled to Portugal with her father in September 1938 where she met Luís. The couple were married in London four months later. During World War II, he was involved with the Anglo-Portuguese News in Lisbon and was referred to in a German propaganda radio programme as "Churchill's spokesman in Lisbon". During the war the couple was active in supporting refugees, who passed through Lisbon in large numbers. They published the Anglo-Portuguese News together until Luís Marques' death in 1976, with Susan Lowndes continuing to publish it until 1980. Susan Lowndes wrote or co-wrote several books on Portugal, such as The selective traveller in Portugal and Portugal: A Traveller's Guide.

Paulo Lowndes Marques was born in 1941. He had two sisters, Ana Vicente (1943-2015) and Antonia Marques Leitão (born 1946). In his youth he would have been exposed to many English writers who passed through Lisbon and visited his parents, including Graham Greene, Evelyn Waugh, Cyril Connolly, Rose Macaulay, Aldous Huxley, Angus Wilson and Sachaverell Sitwell. He attended the English-language St. Julian's School, of which his mother was a member of the Board of Governors. He obtained a law degree from the Faculty of Law of the University of Lisbon and became a distinguished lawyer, setting up his own practice. Lowndes Marques served in the Portuguese Navy, joining the Naval School in 1965 as an officer cadet and being promoted to officer in 1966. This was part of a programme designed to augment naval forces through short-term appointments at a time when Portugal was struggling to keep its colonies. As part of the Companhia de Fuzileiros nº 10, he was posted between 1966 and 1969 in Angola, with the task of patrolling the Congo River between Angola and what was then the Belgian Congo.

== Political career ==
In 1968 he married Maria Isabel Simões Neves de Andrade e Silva (b. 1945), who also graduated in Law and became a lawyer. The couple had a son and a daughter. In 1974, after the collapse of the right-wing Estado Novo government in what became known as the Carnation Revolution, he became one of the founder members of the Christian Democratic CDS – People's Party. Never wanting high party positions, he took responsibility for the party's international relations. Described as the most English of the Portuguese and the most Portuguese of the English, Lowndes Marques was Secretary of State for Foreign Affairs in the Government of Francisco Pinto Balsemão (1981–83). Representing his minister at the Council of Ministers meeting in Brussels, he caused confusion as the other participants assumed that he must be British and was sitting in the wrong chair.

== Social and business activities ==
Lowndes Marques was also President of the Portuguese-British Chamber of Commerce; Honorary Legal Adviser to the British Ambassador; Chairman of the British Historical Society of Portugal for 25 years; Honorary Vice-president of the Anglo-Portuguese Society; and President of the World Monuments Fund Portuguese branch. In this capacity he was instrumental in the restoration of the Belém Tower and Jerónimos Monastery in Belém, which are both now popular tourist attractions for visitors to Lisbon. He was also legal advisor to and Chairman of the Annual General Meeting of St. Julian's School (which named its library after him), the Association of Friends of Monserrate Palace at Sintra, and of an organization that funded maternity wards in the former Portuguese colony of East Timor. Professionally, he was a director at SOPORCEL (a pulp and paper company), Executive Legal Director in the International Department of Plessey in London, and Director of Plessey Automatic Electric in Portugal. He was also Secretary-General of the Cabinda Gulf Oil Company Ltd. As a lawyer he was a member of the Portuguese, British and International Bar Associations.

== Writing ==
Lowndes Marques was the author of O Marquês de Soveral, Seu Tempo e Seu Modo (The Marquis of Soveral: his time and his style), a biography of the best-known Portuguese diplomat to the Court of St James's. As the long-time Chairman of the British Historical Society of Portugal he also produced numerous papers and articles on Portuguese history from a British perspective.

== Honours ==
He was appointed to the Order of the British Empire (OBE), was a Knight of the Sovereign Military Order of Malta, and a Grand Officer of the Order of Infante D. Henrique.

== Death ==
Described as a "patriotic Portuguese who looked like an English conservative", Paulo Lowndes Marques died on 1 January 2010 at the age of 69. According to his friend Diogo Freitas do Amaral, he "died standing up", in reference to the commitments he fulfilled until his death.
