= Purificação Araújo =

Portuguese obstetrician and family planning pioneer (1926–2026)

- Born: Maria da Purificação Araújo; 5 November 1926; Lisbon, Portugal
- Died: 22 July 2026 (aged 99); Lisbon, Portugal
- Occupations: Obstetrician and gynaecologist
- Known for: Known as the "mother of family planning" in Portugal

Maria da Purificação Araújo (5 November 1926 – 22 July 2026) was a Portuguese obstetrician and gynaecologist who has been called the "Mother of Family Planning" in Portugal.

== Life and career ==
Maria da Purificação Araújo was born in Lisbon, Portugal on 5 November 1926. She obtained a degree from the Faculty of Medicine of the University of Lisbon in 1950 and, after a number of internships, became a specialist in Obstetrics and Gynaecology in 1964, having taken a post-graduate course in those subjects at the University of London. She later took further courses in Maternal Health and Family Planning in London, Paris and the USA. Portugal at that time suffered from high incidences of maternal deaths and perinatal mortality, reflecting the lack of care available to pregnant women, foetuses and newborns. Only 65% of births were in hospital. Maternity clinics did not have operating rooms nor did they have obstetricians and neonatologists, which meant they were ill-equipped to deal with complications that could arise suddenly. Araújo campaigned for maternity facilities to be linked to hospitals.

In 1971 Araújo was made head of the Maternal Health Service of the Portuguese Directorate-General for Health. The Service was responsible for pregnancy and child health care, as well as the integration of Family Planning into the newly created national Health Centres. Her introduction of prenatal and postnatal care made a major contribution to reducing negative outcomes from pregnancy and childbirth. Arguing that family planning contributed to the promotion of the health of women and children by making it possible to avoid unwanted pregnancies and by spacing births, she promoted the contraceptive pill, together with the Portuguese Family Planning Association. This was very much against the opposition of the Catholic Church. She also campaigned in favour of abortion. Furthermore, Araújo played an important role in the introduction of the Pap test in Portugal. She was a visiting professor at the National School of Public Health (1973–1978). In 1973, she initiated Family Planning Training Courses for doctors and nurses, together with the Family Planning Association.

Asked how many births she had assisted she replied that she had lost count, but that it ran into "a few thousand". As an opponent of the authoritarian government of Portugal, known as the Estado Novo, she assisted many pregnant women who were in hiding from the government, risking her own arrest. After the Carnation Revolution of 25 April 1974, when the Estado Novo was overthrown, Araújo was able to carry out training courses on family planning both in Portugal and, between 1978 and 1992, for the United Nations Population Fund in Portuguese-speaking countries, together with Ana Vicente and others.

Araújo was a member of the National Commission for Maternal and Child Health, created by the Minister of Health in 1989, and a member of the National Committee of Baby-Friendly Hospitals. In her private practice she promoted the ideas of painless childbirth first introduced into Portugal by Cesina Bermudes and Pedro Monjardino. In 1996 she was awarded the Distinguished Services Medal by the Ministry of Health and this was followed by a Gold Medal in 2008. On International Women's Day in 1998 she was made a Commander of the Order of Merit, a national award given to those making sacrifices of benefit to the community. Also in 2008, she received a Gold Medal from Lisbon City Council in recognition of her development of family planning services. In 2014 she was awarded a Medal of Merit from the Portuguese Medical Association.

Araújo died on 22 July 2026, at the age of 99.
