= Virgínia Rau =

Portuguese archaeologist and historian (1907–1973)

Virgínia de Bivar Robertes Rau
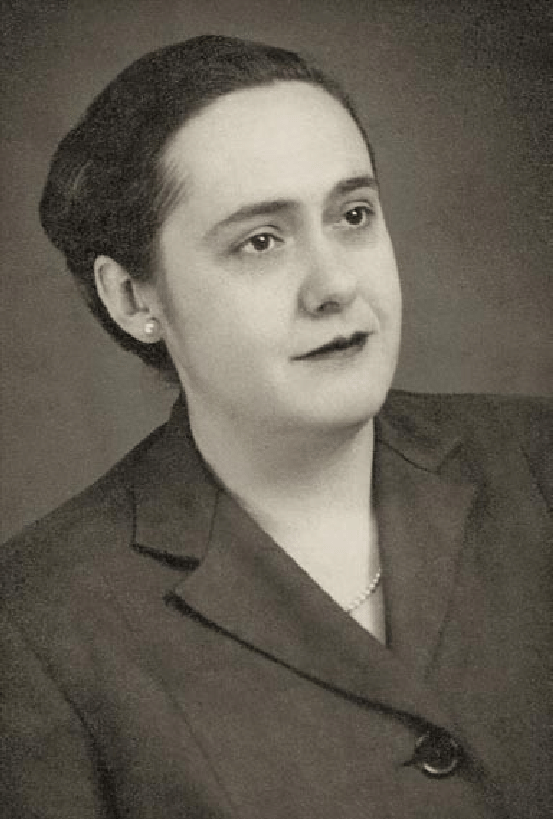
- Born: December 4, 1907; Lisbon, Portugal
- Died: November 2, 1973 (aged 65)
- Education: University of Lisbon; University of Toulouse
- Occupations: Archaeologist, Historian
- Known for: Research on Portuguese and Portuguese colonial history Pioneering historiography of António Coelho Guerreiro
- Notable work: Publications on Portuguese and colonial medieval and modern history; economic history of Brazil and Angola
- Awards: Grand Officer of the Order of Public Instruction (1969)

Virgínia de Bivar Robertes Rau (4/9 December 1907 – 2 November 1973) was a Portuguese archaeologist and historian. She was an expert on Portuguese and Portuguese colonial history and author of many history books.

She was the daughter of Luís Rau, Jr. (1865–1943) of German descent, and his wife Matilde de Bivar de Paula Robertes (1879–1961) of Spanish descent, who married in Lisbon in 1902. She enrolled in the Faculty of Letters of the University of Lisbon in 1927, but the following year went aboard, where she attended several courses including at the University of Toulouse. In 1939, due to the beginning of the Second World War, she returned to Lisbon, where she joined the Historical and Philosophical Sciences of the Faculty of Arts. A member of the Academia Portuguesa da História, Rau published a vast collection of works on Portuguese and colonial medieval and modern history. On 2 July 1969 she was awarded the rank of Grand Officer of the Order of Public Instruction. Portuguese Studies Review cites her as a pioneer of the historiographical research of Timor governor António Coelho Guerreiro, after a work she published in 1956. She has also commented on the economic history of Brazil and Angola.

Rau worked very closely with the British community in Lisbon. In 1943 she became a member of the governing council of the Lisbon branch of the Historical Association, contributing several articles to its annual reports, including one on Catherine of Braganza. In 1953, she was one of three people, all women, who made donations to the branch when it was experiencing financial difficulties.
