= El Hierro (Senate constituency) =

Senate constituency in Spain

Coordinates: 27°45′N 18°0′W

- Senate of Spain; Electoral constituency
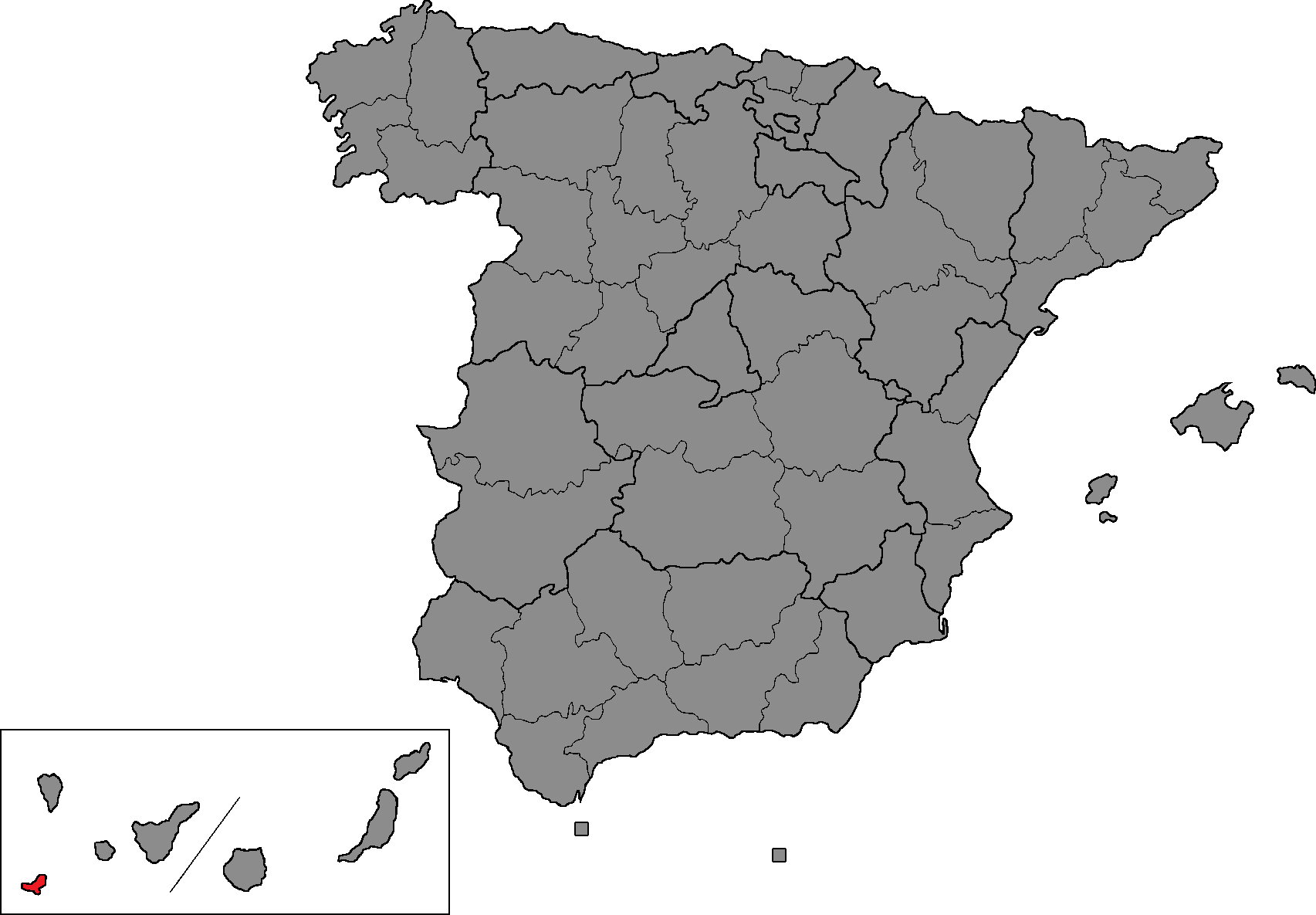
- Location of El Hierro within Spain
- Island: El Hierro
- Autonomous community: Canary Islands
- Population: ▲11,806 (2024)
- Electorate: ▲11,155 (2023)
- Major settlements: Valverde

Current constituency
- Created: 1979
- Seats: 1
- Member: AHI (1)

El Hierro is one of the 60 constituencies represented in the Senate of Spain, the upper chamber of the Spanish parliament, the Cortes Generales. The constituency (whose boundaries correspond to those of the homonymous island) elects one senator. The electoral system uses open-list (Note: Parties can group candidates into lists, although each candidate is treated separately for the purpose of the voting procedure.) partial block voting, allowing electors to vote for individual candidates rather than parties.

== Electoral system ==
The constituency was created as per the Political Reform Law and was first contested in the 1977 general election. The Law provided for the provinces of Spain to be established as multi-member districts in the Senate, with this regulation being maintained under the Spanish Constitution of 1978. Additionally, the Constitution requires for any modification of the provincial limits to be approved under an organic law, needing an absolute majority in the Cortes Generales.

Voting is based on universal suffrage, comprising all Spanish nationals over 18 years of age with full political rights, provided that they have not been deprived of the right to vote by a final sentence. The only exception was in 1977, when this was limited to nationals over 21 years of age and in full enjoyment of their political and civil rights. Amendments in 2011 required non-resident citizens to apply for voting, a system known as "begged" voting (Spanish: Voto rogado). which was abolished in 2022. Further, amendments in 2018 granted the right to vote to those legally incapacitated. 209 Senate seats (207 in 1977, 208 from 1978 to 2026) are elected using open-list partial block voting: voters in constituencies electing four seats can choose up to three candidates; in those with two or three seats, up to two; and in single-member districts, one. Each of the 47 peninsular provinces is allocated four seats, while in insular provinces—such as the Balearic and Canary Islands—the districts are the islands themselves, with the larger ones (Mallorca, Gran Canaria and Tenerife) being allocated three seats each, and the smaller ones (Menorca, Ibiza, Formentera, Fuerteventura, La Gomera, El Hierro, Lanzarote and La Palma) one each. (Note: La Gomera and El Hierro comprised a single constituency for the 1977 election. A constitutional reform in 2026 awarded Formentera an independent senator separate from Ibiza.) Ceuta and Melilla elect two seats each. Until 1985, the law also provided for by-elections to fill Senate seats vacated up to two years into the legislature; subsequently, any vacancies arising after the proclamation of candidates and during the legislative term are filled by the next candidates on the party lists or, when required, by designated substitutes.

The electoral law allows for parties and federations registered in the interior ministry, alliances and groupings of electors to present lists of candidates. Parties and federations intending to form an alliance are required to inform the relevant electoral commission within 10 days of the election call—15 before 1985—whereas groupings of electors need to secure the signature of at least one percent of the electorate in the constituencies for which they seek election—one permille of the electorate, with a compulsory minimum of 500 signatures, until 1985—disallowing electors from signing for more than one list. Also since 2011, parties, federations or alliances that have not obtained a mandate in either chamber of the Cortes at the preceding election are required to secure the signature of at least 0.1 percent of electors in the aforementioned constituencies. Amendments in 2007 required a balanced composition of men and women in the electoral lists, so that candidates of either sex made up at least 40 percent of the total composition; further amendments in 2024 required the use of a zipper system.

== Senators ==
Senators for El Hierro 1977–
Key to parties PSOE AHI UCD
| Legislature | Election | Distribution |
| 1st | 1979 | 1 |
| 2nd | 1982 | 1 |
| 3rd | 1986 | 1 |
| 4th | 1989 | 1 |
| 5th | 1993 | 1 |
| 6th | 1996 | 1 |
| 7th | 2000 | 1 |
| 8th | 2004 | 1 |
| 9th | 2008 | 1 |
| 10th | 2011 | 1 |
| 11th | 2015 | 1 |
| 12th | 2016 | 1 |
| 13th | 2019 (Apr) | 1 |
| 14th | 2019 (Nov) | 1 |
| 15th | 2023 | 1 |

== General elections ==
=== 2023 ===
Summary of the 23 July 2023 Senate of Spain election results in El Hierro
| Parties and alliances | Popular vote | | | Seats | |
| Parties and alliances | Votes | % | ±pp | Total | +/− |
|---|---|---|---|---|---|
| Independent Herrenian Group (AHI) | 2,189 | 36.89 | +2.06 | 1 | +1 |
| Spanish Socialist Workers' Party (PSOE) | 1,759 | 29.64 | –9.16 | 0 | –1 |
| People's Party (PP) | 1,173 | 19.77 | +3.81 | 0 | ±0 |
| Herrenian Assembly (AH) | 360 | 6.07 | New | 0 | ±0 |
| Vox (Vox) | 262 | 4.42 | New | 0 | ±0 |
| Canaries Now–Communist Party of the Canarian People (ANC–UP–PCPC) | 68 | 1.15 | +1.02 | 0 | ±0 |
| Zero Cuts (Recortes Cero) | 24 | 0.40 | +0.11 | 0 | ±0 |
| Blank ballots (Note: The percentage of blank ballots is calculated over the official number of valid votes cast, irrespective of the total number of votes shown as a result of adding up the individual results for each party.) | 99 | 1.67 | +0.27 | | |
| Total | 5,934 | | | 1 | ±0 |
| Valid votes | 5,934 | 96.80 | –0.26 | | |
| Invalid votes | 196 | 3.20 | +0.26 | | |
| Votes cast / turnout | 6,130 | 54.95 | +5.39 | | |
| Abstentions | 5,025 | 45.05 | –5.39 | | |
| Registered voters | 11,155 | | | | |

=== November 2019 ===
Summary of the 10 November 2019 Senate of Spain election results in El Hierro
| Parties and alliances | Popular vote | | | Seats | |
| Parties and alliances | Votes | % | ±pp | Total | +/− |
|---|---|---|---|---|---|
| Spanish Socialist Workers' Party (PSOE) | 2,025 | 38.80 | | 1 | ±0 |
| Independent Herrenian Group–Canarian Coalition–New Canaries (AHI–CCa–NC) | 1,818 | 34.83 | | 0 | ±0 |
| People's Party (PP) | 833 | 15.96 | | 0 | ±0 |
| United We Can (Podemos–IU) | 324 | 6.21 | | 0 | ±0 |
| Citizens–Party of the Citizenry (Cs) | 82 | 1.57 | | 0 | ±0 |
| Animalist Party Against Mistreatment of Animals (PACMA) | 42 | 0.80 | | 0 | ±0 |
| Zero Cuts–Green Group (Recortes Cero–GV) | 15 | 0.29 | | 0 | ±0 |
| Canaries Now (ANC–UP) | 7 | 0.13 | New | 0 | ±0 |
| Blank ballots | 73 | 1.40 | | | |
| Total | 5,219 | | | 1 | ±0 |
| Valid votes | 5,219 | 97.06 | | | |
| Invalid votes | 158 | 2.94 | | | |
| Votes cast / turnout | 5,377 | 49.56 | | | |
| Abstentions | 5,473 | 50.44 | | | |
| Registered voters | 10,850 | | | | |

=== April 2019 ===
Summary of the 28 April 2019 Senate of Spain election results in El Hierro
| Candidates | Parties and coalitions | Popular vote | |
| Candidates | Parties and coalitions | Votes | % |
|---|---|---|---|
| Esther Carmona Delgado | PSOE | 2,328 | 39.82 |
| • Daniel Morales Barrera | AHI–CCa | 1,465 | 25.06 |
| • José Miguel Sánchez Padrón | PP | 1,091 | 18.66 |
| • Teresa de las Nieves Ruiz González | Podemos–IU–Equo | 431 | 7.37 |
| • Lisardo Gaspar Cejas Padrón | Cs | 366 | 6.26 |
| • Silvana Ferreira Pérez | PACMA | 76 | 1.30 |
| • Neido González Alvarez | Recortes Cero–GV | 13 | 0.22 |
| Blank ballots | | 77 | 1.32 |
| Total | | 5,847 | |
| Valid votes | | 5,847 | 96.98 |
| Invalid votes | | 182 | 3.02 |
| Votes cast / turnout | | 6,029 | 55.53 |
| Abstentions | | 4,828 | 44.47 |
| Registered voters | | 10,857 | |

=== 2016 ===
Summary of the 26 June 2016 Senate of Spain election results in El Hierro
| Candidates | Parties and coalitions | Popular vote | |
| Candidates | Parties and coalitions | Votes | % |
|---|---|---|---|
| Pablo Rodríguez Cejas | CCa–AHI | 2,149 | 40.32 |
| • José Miguel Sánchez Padrón | PP | 1,282 | 24.05 |
| • Juan Castañeda Acosta | PSOE–NCa | 966 | 18.12 |
| • Sandra Magdalena Lima Casañas | Podemos–IU–Equo | 578 | 10.84 |
| • Lisardo Gaspar Cejas Padrón | C's | 186 | 3.49 |
| • María Josefa González Chinea | PACMA | 51 | 0.96 |
| • Selene Benítez Ghersi | Recortes Cero–GV | 14 | 0.26 |
| • Bruno Díaz González | PCPC | 9 | 0.17 |
| Blank ballots | | 95 | 1.78 |
| Total | | 5,330 | |
| Valid votes | | 5,330 | 96.47 |
| Invalid votes | | 195 | 3.53 |
| Votes cast / turnout | | 5,525 | 51.09 |
| Abstentions | | 5,290 | 48.91 |
| Registered voters | | 10,815 | |

=== 2015 ===
Summary of the 20 December 2015 Senate of Spain election results in El Hierro
| Candidates | Parties and coalitions | Popular vote | |
| Candidates | Parties and coalitions | Votes | % |
|---|---|---|---|
| Pablo Rodríguez Cejas | CCa–AHI | 2,133 | 40.46 |
| • Juan Castañeda Acosta | PSOE–NCa | 1,107 | 21.00 |
| • Rita Beatriz Machín González | PP | 1,019 | 19.33 |
| • Raimundo Casañas Ortiz | Podemos | 455 | 8.63 |
| • Sara María Pérez Padrón | C's | 230 | 4.36 |
| • Miguel Ángel Peraza Chinea | IUC–IpH–UPeC | 153 | 2.90 |
| • María Candelaria Oval Afonso | PACMA | 43 | 0.82 |
| • Selene Alexandra Benítez Ghersi | Recortes Cero–GV | 12 | 0.23 |
| • Ángel Basilio González Mesa | UPyD | 8 | 0.15 |
| • Sara María Martín Pimentel | PCPC | 7 | 0.13 |
| Blank ballots | | 105 | 1.99 |
| Total | | 5,272 | |
| Valid votes | | 5,272 | 96.13 |
| Invalid votes | | 212 | 3.87 |
| Votes cast / turnout | | 5,484 | 51.17 |
| Abstentions | | 5,233 | 48.83 |
| Registered voters | | 10,717 | |

=== 2011 ===
Summary of the 20 November 2011 Senate of Spain election results in El Hierro
| Candidates | Parties and coalitions | Popular vote | |
| Candidates | Parties and coalitions | Votes | % |
|---|---|---|---|
| Narvay Quintero Castañeda | CC–AHI–NC | 1,837 | 34.69 |
| • Juan Luis González Padrón | PSOE | 1,695 | 32.01 |
| • Ángel Luis Lima Moeck | PP | 1,415 | 26.72 |
| • Abel Fernández Acosta | IUC–IpH–LV | 181 | 3.42 |
| • José Antonio De Vera Alventosa | UPyD | 45 | 0.85 |
| • Aitor González Padilla | PCPE | 16 | 0.30 |
| Blank ballots | | 106 | 2.00 |
| Total | | 5,295 | |
| Valid votes | | 5,295 | 97.35 |
| Invalid votes | | 144 | 2.65 |
| Votes cast / turnout | | 5,439 | 53.26 |
| Abstentions | | 4,773 | 46.74 |
| Registered voters | | 10,212 | |

=== 2008 ===
Summary of the 9 March 2008 Senate of Spain election results in El Hierro
| Candidates | Parties and coalitions | Popular vote | |
| Candidates | Parties and coalitions | Votes | % |
|---|---|---|---|
| Narvay Quintero Castañeda | AHI–CC | 2,412 | 40.15 |
| • Alpidio Valentín Armas González | PSOE | 2,204 | 36.69 |
| • Desirée Padrón Mendoza | PP | 1,201 | 19.99 |
| • Juan Hernández Lutzardo | MUPC | 42 | 0.70 |
| • Rafael Parra Hernanz | IUC | 32 | 0.53 |
| • Ana María Pérez Herrera | LV | 16 | 0.27 |
| • Ana Mercedes Padrón Fernández | LV–GV | 8 | 0.13 |
| • Luis Alberto Hernández González | PCPC | 7 | 0.12 |
| • María Isabel De Martín Padrón | UPyD | 6 | 0.10 |
| • Ana Cristina González Figueroa | ANC | 5 | 0.08 |
| • Victoria Alonso Plasencia | POSI | 5 | 0.08 |
| • Juan Miguel Gutiérrez García | PUM+J | 4 | 0.07 |
| • Echedey Padrón Guerra | UP | 2 | 0.03 |
| • Cristina Estévez Llorente | PH | 2 | 0.03 |
| • Rubén González Gutiérrez | FE–JONS | 1 | 0.02 |
| • Jesús María Ibáñez Estévez | CTC | 1 | 0.02 |
| Blank ballots | | 59 | 0.98 |
| Total | | 6,007 | |
| Valid votes | | 6,007 | 98.11 |
| Invalid votes | | 116 | 1.89 |
| Votes cast / turnout | | 6,123 | 64.11 |
| Abstentions | | 3,428 | 35.89 |
| Registered voters | | 9,551 | |

=== 2004 ===
Summary of the 14 March 2004 Senate of Spain election results in El Hierro
| Candidates | Parties and coalitions | Popular vote | |
| Candidates | Parties and coalitions | Votes | % |
|---|---|---|---|
| Félix Ayala Fonte | CC–AHI | 2,182 | 38.72 |
| • María Carmen Morales Hernández | PP | 1,603 | 28.45 |
| • Luciano Eutimio Armas Morales | PSOE–PNC | 1,554 | 27.58 |
| • María Felina León Beltrán | LV–IU–AC25M | 74 | 1.31 |
| • Manuel Luis Espinosa Krawany | CDS | 66 | 1.17 |
| • Álvaro Juan Monzón Santana | LV–GV | 39 | 0.69 |
| • Eduardo José Hernández López | CTC | 2 | 0.04 |
| Blank ballots | | 115 | 2.04 |
| Total | | 5,635 | |
| Valid votes | | 5,635 | 97.41 |
| Invalid votes | | 150 | 2.59 |
| Votes cast / turnout | | 5,785 | 64.67 |
| Abstentions | | 3,160 | 35.33 |
| Registered voters | | 8,945 | |

=== 2000 ===
Summary of the 12 March 2000 Senate of Spain election results in El Hierro
| Candidates | Parties and coalitions | Popular vote | |
| Candidates | Parties and coalitions | Votes | % |
|---|---|---|---|
| Venancio Acosta Padrón | CC–AHI | 2,141 | 43.33 |
| • Regina García Casañas | PP | 1,425 | 28.84 |
| • Juan Castañeda Acosta | PSOE–p | 1,250 | 25.30 |
| • Jesús Peñas Artero | FE | 8 | 0.16 |
| Blank ballots | | 117 | 2.37 |
| Total | | 4,941 | |
| Valid votes | | 4,941 | 98.31 |
| Invalid votes | | 85 | 1.69 |
| Votes cast / turnout | | 5,026 | 62.37 |
| Abstentions | | 3,033 | 37.63 |
| Registered voters | | 8,059 | |

=== 1996 ===
Summary of the 3 March 1996 Senate of Spain election results in El Hierro
| Candidates | Parties and coalitions | Popular vote | |
| Candidates | Parties and coalitions | Votes | % |
|---|---|---|---|
| Pedro Luis Padrón Rodríguez | CC | 2,093 | 44.93 |
| • Inocencio Hernández González | PSOE | 1,257 | 26.99 |
| • Federico Padrón Padrón | PP | 1,122 | 24.09 |
| • Ramón Morales González | IUC | 71 | 1.52 |
| • Víctor Manuel Padrón Barrera | UC | 19 | 0.41 |
| Blank ballots | | 96 | 2.06 |
| Total | | 4,658 | |
| Valid votes | | 4,658 | 98.56 |
| Invalid votes | | 68 | 1.44 |
| Votes cast / turnout | | 4,726 | 69.94 |
| Abstentions | | 2,031 | 30.06 |
| Registered voters | | 6,757 | |

=== 1993 ===
Summary of the 6 June 1993 Senate of Spain election results in El Hierro
| Candidates | Parties and coalitions | Popular vote | |
| Candidates | Parties and coalitions | Votes | % |
|---|---|---|---|
| Pedro Luis Padrón Rodríguez | CC (AHI–AIC) | 1,944 | 43.52 |
| • Eulalio Elviro Reboso Gutiérrez | PP | 1,222 | 27.36 |
| • José Francisco Armas Pérez | PSOE | 1,195 | 26.75 |
| • Manuel Luis Espinosa Krawany | CDS | 34 | 0.76 |
| • María Lourdes Rodríguez Figueroa | PH | 5 | 0.11 |
| Blank ballots | | 67 | 1.50 |
| Total | | 4,467 | |
| Valid votes | | 4,467 | 98.78 |
| Invalid votes | | 55 | 1.22 |
| Votes cast / turnout | | 4,522 | 72.53 |
| Abstentions | | 1,713 | 27.47 |
| Registered voters | | 6,235 | |

=== 1989 ===
Summary of the 29 October 1989 Senate of Spain election results in El Hierro
| Candidates | Parties and coalitions | Popular vote | |
| Candidates | Parties and coalitions | Votes | % |
|---|---|---|---|
| Venancio Acosta Padrón | AHI | 1,219 | 31.33 |
| • José Francisco Armas Pérez | PSOE | 1,133 | 29.12 |
| • Longinos Morales Pérez | PP | 983 | 25.26 |
| • Aurelio Ayala Fonte | IU–ICU | 535 | 13.75 |
| • Agustina Tomás Fernández | LV–LV | 5 | 0.13 |
| • Jesús Valentín Padrón Febles | PST | 1 | 0.03 |
| • José Manuel Quevedo Talavera | CEES | 0 | 0.00 |
| Blank ballots | | 15 | 0.39 |
| Total | | 3,891 | |
| Valid votes | | 3,891 | 98.18 |
| Invalid votes | | 72 | 1.82 |
| Votes cast / turnout | | 3,963 | 72.62 |
| Abstentions | | 1,494 | 27.38 |
| Registered voters | | 5,457 | |

=== 1986 ===
Summary of the 22 June 1986 Senate of Spain election results in El Hierro
| Candidates | Parties and coalitions | Popular vote | |
| Candidates | Parties and coalitions | Votes | % |
|---|---|---|---|
| José Francisco Armas Pérez | PSOE | 1,097 | 33.96 |
| • Federico Padrón Padrón | AP–PDP–PL | 886 | 27.43 |
| • Aurelio Ayala Fonte | ICU | 791 | 24.49 |
| • Cayo Francisco Armas Benítez | CDS | 430 | 13.31 |
| • Florán Avelino Eulalio Fernández Darías | PRD | 5 | 0.15 |
| • Juan Bautista Correas | UCE | 2 | 0.06 |
| Blank ballots | | 19 | 0.59 |
| Total | | 3,230 | |
| Valid votes | | 3,230 | 98.30 |
| Invalid votes | | 56 | 1.70 |
| Votes cast / turnout | | 3,286 | 63.82 |
| Abstentions | | 1,863 | 36.18 |
| Registered voters | | 5,149 | |

=== 1982 ===
Summary of the 28 October 1982 Senate of Spain election results in El Hierro
| Candidates | Parties and coalitions | Popular vote | |
| Candidates | Parties and coalitions | Votes | % |
|---|---|---|---|
| Federico Padrón Padrón | UCD | 1,251 | 36.24 |
| • Eligio Hernández Gutiérrez | PSOE | 855 | 24.77 |
| • Longinos Morales Pérez | AP–PDP | 802 | 23.23 |
| • Aurelio Ayala Fonte | AC–CC | 416 | 12.05 |
| • Ramón Martín Febles Castañeda | FN | 71 | 2.06 |
| • Raúl Antonio Alamo Panizo | CDS | 57 | 1.65 |
| • José Francisco Armas Pérez | PSOE | 0 | 0.00 |
| Blank ballots | | 0 | 0.00 |
| Total | | 3,452 | |
| Valid votes | | 3,452 | 100.00 |
| Invalid votes | | 0 | 0.00 |
| Votes cast / turnout | | 3,452 | 72.48 |
| Abstentions | | 1,311 | 27.52 |
| Registered voters | | 4,763 | |

=== 1979 ===
Summary of the 1 March 1979 Senate of Spain election results in El Hierro
| Candidates | Parties and coalitions | Popular vote | |
| Candidates | Parties and coalitions | Votes | % |
|---|---|---|---|
| Federico Padrón Padrón | UCD | 1,871 | 65.70 |
| • Aurelio Ayala Fonte | PCE | 382 | 13.41 |
| • Manuel Hernández Quintero | PSOE | 299 | 10.50 |
| • Cándido Magdaleno Cruz | CD | 148 | 5.20 |
| • Ramón Febles Castañeda | UN | 131 | 4.60 |
| Blank ballots | | 17 | 0.60 |
| Total | | 2,848 | |
| Valid votes | | 2,848 | 99.23 |
| Invalid votes | | 22 | 0.77 |
| Votes cast / turnout | | 2,870 | 49.84 |
| Abstentions | | 2,889 | 50.16 |
| Registered voters | | 5,759 | |

== Bibliography ==
- Ley 1/1977, de 4 de enero, para la Reforma Política (Fundamental Law 1/1977). Official State Gazette (in Spanish). 4 January 1977. BOE-A-1977-165.
- Real Decreto-ley 20/1977, de 18 de marzo, sobre Normas Electorales (Royal Decree-Law 20/1977). Official State Gazette (in Spanish). 18 March 1977. BOE-A-1977-7445.
- Constitución Española (Constitution). Official State Gazette (in Spanish). 27 December 1978. BOE-A-1978-31229.
- Ley Orgánica 5/1985, de 19 de junio, del Régimen Electoral General (Organic Law 5/1985). Official State Gazette (in Spanish). 19 June 1985. BOE-A-1985-11672.
- Carreras de Odriozola, Albert; Tafunell Sambola, Xavier (2005) [1989]. Estadísticas históricas de España, siglos XIX-XX (PDF) (in Spanish). Vol. 1 (II ed.). Bilbao: Fundación BBVA. pp. 1072–1097. ISBN 84-96515-00-1. Archived from the original (PDF) on 24 September 2015.
