= Valverde, Santa Cruz de Tenerife =

Valverde
- Municipality
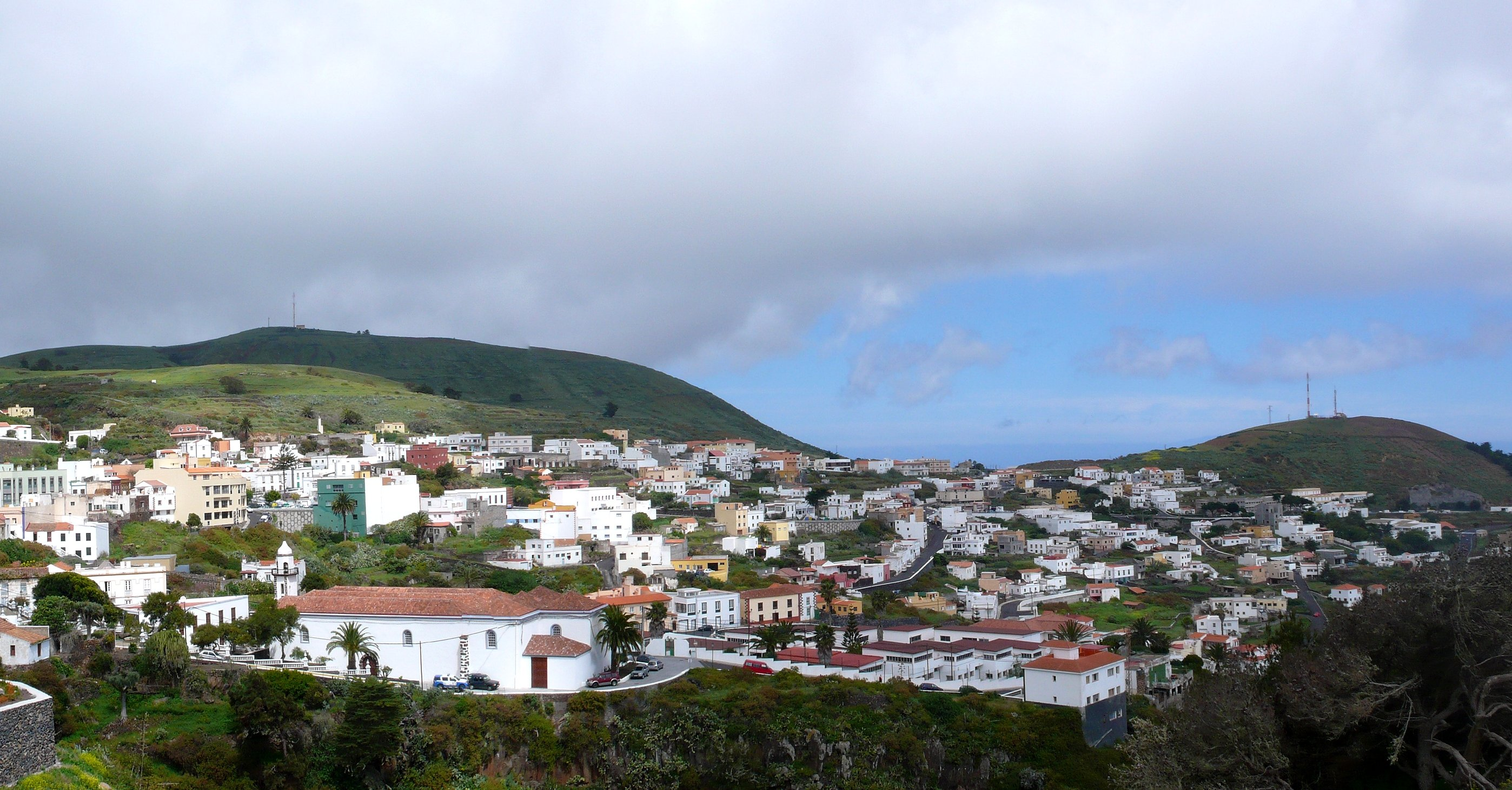

- Coat of arms

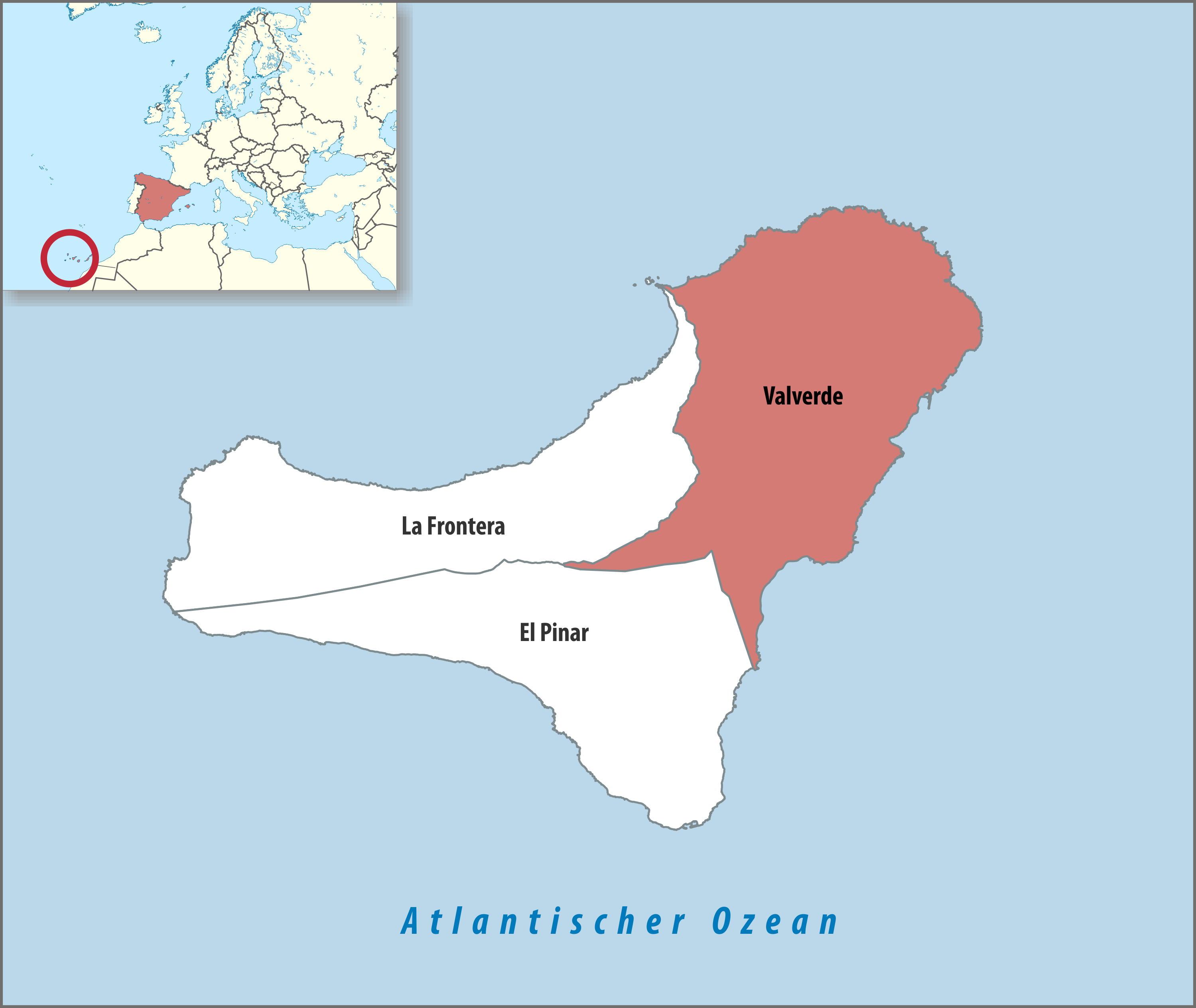
- Location of the municipality within El Hierro
- Location of Valverde
- Location within Canary Islands Location within Spain, Canary Islands
- Coordinates: 27°48′0″N 17°55′0″W
- Country: Spain
- Autonomous community: Canary Islands
- Province: Santa Cruz de Tenerife
- Island: El Hierro

Area
  - Total: 103.65 km^{2} (40.02 sq mi)
- Elevation: 571 m (1,873 ft)

Population (2025-01-01)
  - Total: 5,338
  - Density: 51.50/km^{2} (133.4/sq mi)
- Postal code: E-38900

Valverde (Spanish pronunciation: [balˈβeɾðe]; lit. 'Greenvalley') is a municipality in the Canary Islands in the province of Santa Cruz de Tenerife. It is located on the northeast part of El Hierro (the rest of the island being the municipalities of Frontera and El Pinar). The town of the same name serves as the island's official capital. It is both the smallest Canarian capital and the only one not located by the sea. The town's airport and seaport are both several kilometres away on the island's east coast.

Pastureland and smallholdings dominate the central plateau area with pine and cloud forest at progressively higher elevations. The coastal areas and lower slopes are arid and mainly left to unimproved scrub and sparse grassland. Volcanism is prominent, with several cinder cones and areas of lava flow to be seen.

== Historical population ==
Year	Population
2001	4,227
2002	4,643
2003	4,727
2013	5,048

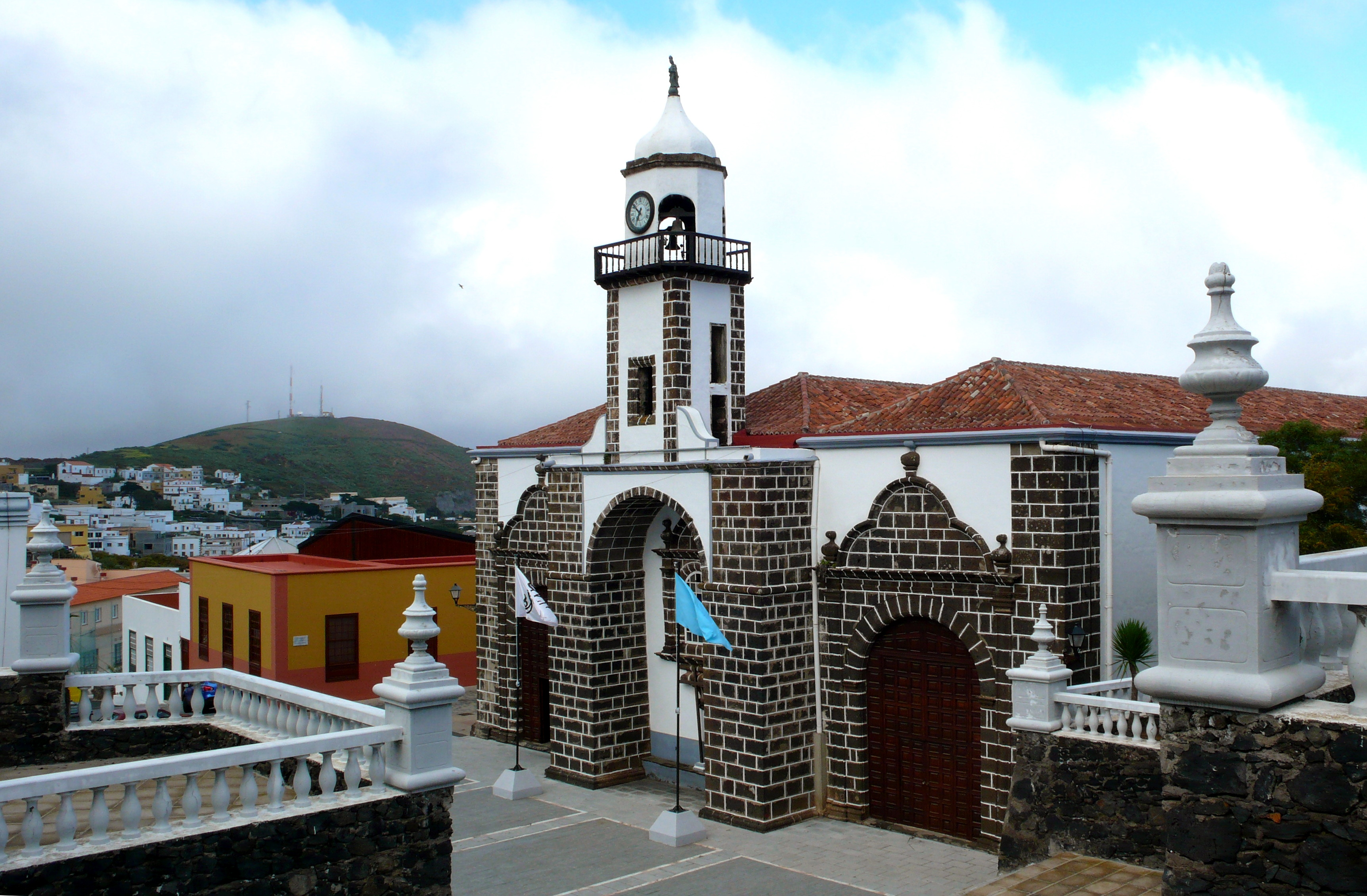
Church of Nuestra Señora de la Concepción, Valverde

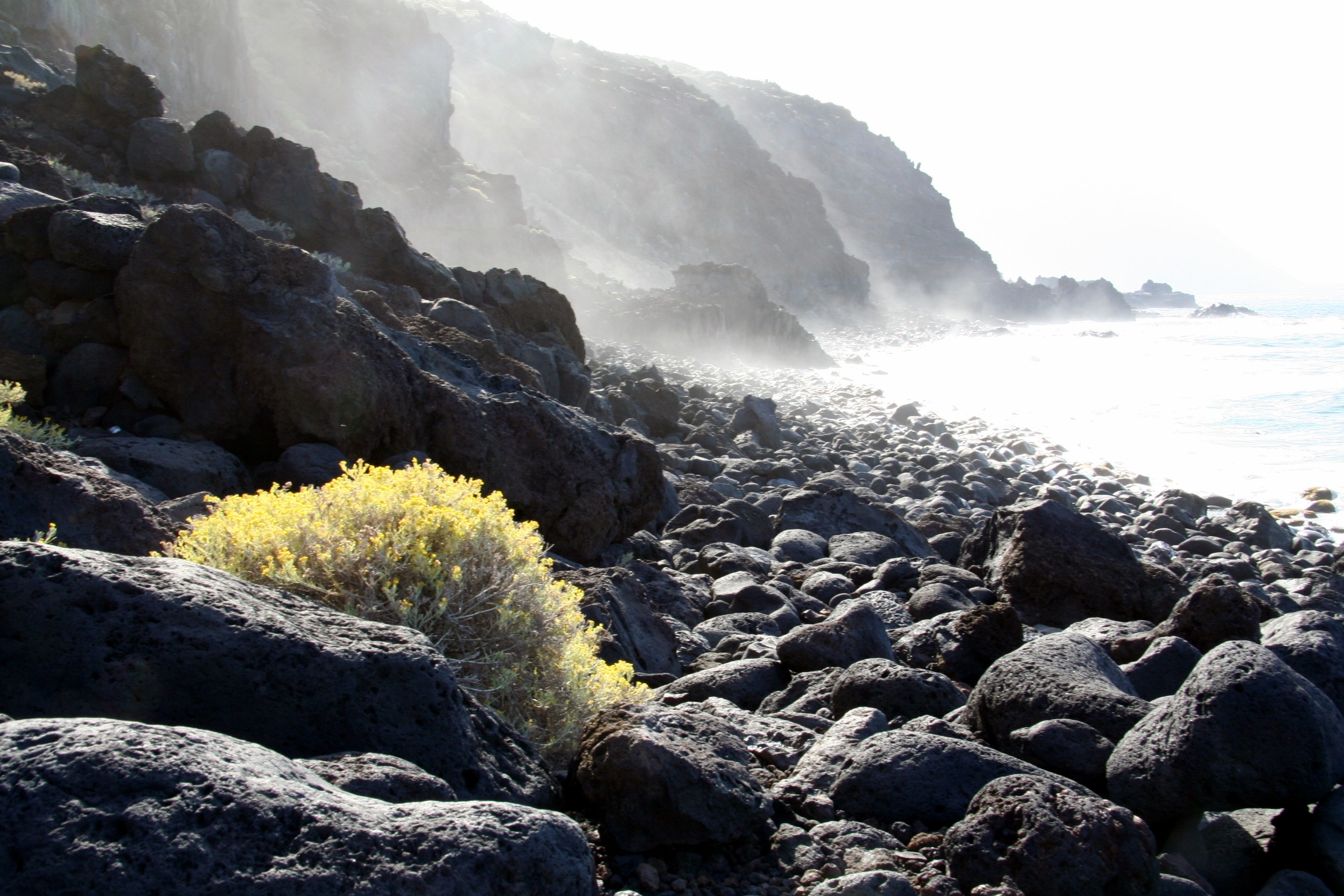
Charco Azul, Valverde

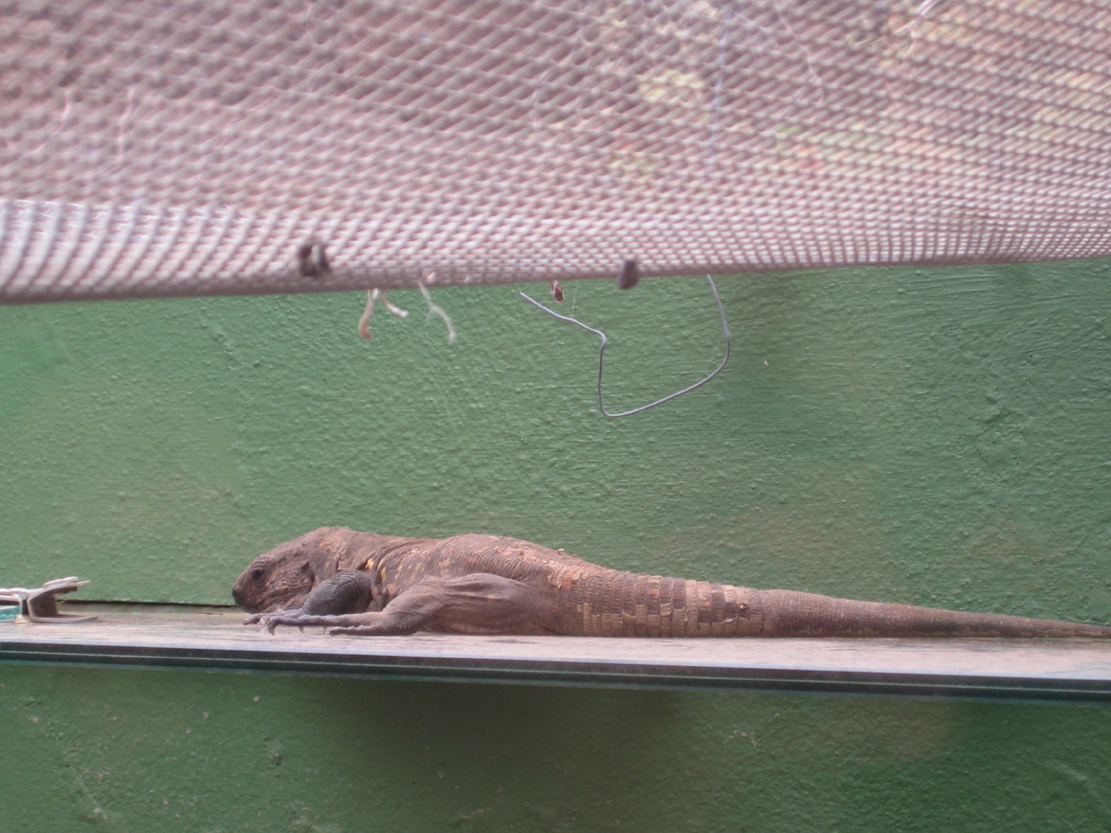
The Giant Lizard of El Hierro, endemic to this island

== Climate ==
The city has a tropical desert climate (Köppen climate classification BWh) with mild temperatures year round. Winters are mild and warm with a January mean of 18.8 °C (65.8 °F). Temperatures rarely go below 10 °C (50.0 °F) with the record low being 8.0 °C (46.4 °F) on January 16, 1981. Frosts are non-existent. Most of the precipitation falls during the winter months. Summers are warm with the warmest month, September averaging 24.1 °C (75.4 °F), indicating a seasonal lag. Precipitation is scarce during this time, averaging 0 millimetres (0 in) to 2 millimetres (0 in). Owing to its proximity to the sea, extreme temperatures are rare with the highest temperature recorded being 34.2 °C (93.6 °F) on October 16, 1983.

Valverde is at an altitude of 571 metres above sea level, while El Hierro airport is just 32 metres above sea level. The difference in altitude can have a significant effect on the weather.

Climate data for Hierro Airport
Month	Jan	Feb	Mar	Apr	May	Jun	Jul	Aug	Sep	Oct	Nov	Dec	Year
Record high °C (°F)	28.5 (83.3)	29.4 (84.9)	32.6 (90.7)	33.2 (91.8)	31.4 (88.5)	32.0 (89.6)	32.4 (90.3)	33.8 (92.8)	33.3 (91.9)	34.2 (93.6)	32.4 (90.3)	28.3 (82.9)	34.2 (93.6)
Mean daily maximum °C (°F)	20.9 (69.6)	20.8 (69.4)	21.4 (70.5)	21.6 (70.9)	22.6 (72.7)	24.0 (75.2)	25.0 (77.0)	26.1 (79.0)	26.5 (79.7)	25.6 (78.1)	23.7 (74.7)	22.2 (72.0)	23.4 (74.1)
Daily mean °C (°F)	18.8 (65.8)	18.6 (65.5)	19.0 (66.2)	19.3 (66.7)	20.3 (68.5)	21.7 (71.1)	22.8 (73.0)	23.7 (74.7)	24.1 (75.4)	23.3 (73.9)	21.6 (70.9)	20.0 (68.0)	21.1 (70.0)
Mean daily minimum °C (°F)	16.6 (61.9)	16.4 (61.5)	16.7 (62.1)	17.0 (62.6)	17.9 (64.2)	19.3 (66.7)	20.5 (68.9)	21.3 (70.3)	21.7 (71.1)	20.9 (69.6)	19.5 (67.1)	17.8 (64.0)	18.8 (65.8)
Record low °C (°F)	8.0 (46.4)	9.0 (48.2)	9.2 (48.6)	10.0 (50.0)	10.0 (50.0)	10.0 (50.0)	14.0 (57.2)	14.2 (57.6)	15.2 (59.4)	11.0 (51.8)	12.0 (53.6)	9.6 (49.3)	8.0 (46.4)
Average precipitation mm (inches)	28 (1.1)	29 (1.1)	20 (0.8)	14 (0.6)	2 (0.1)	1 (0.0)	0 (0)	0 (0)	2 (0.1)	12 (0.5)	26 (1.0)	33 (1.3)	170 (6.7)
Average precipitation days (≥ 1.0 mm)	3	2	3	1	0	0	0	0	0	2	2	4	19
Average relative humidity (%)	74	76	74	74	74	75	77	78	77	76	74	74	75
Mean monthly sunshine hours	140	158	184	197	233	229	210	234	210	189	157	143	2,339
Source 1: Agencia Estatal de Meteorología (normals 1971-2010)
Source 2: Agencia Estatal de Meteorología (extremes only 1973-present)

== See also ==
- List of municipalities in Santa Cruz de Tenerife
