= La Frontera, Santa Cruz de Tenerife =

La Frontera
- Municipality
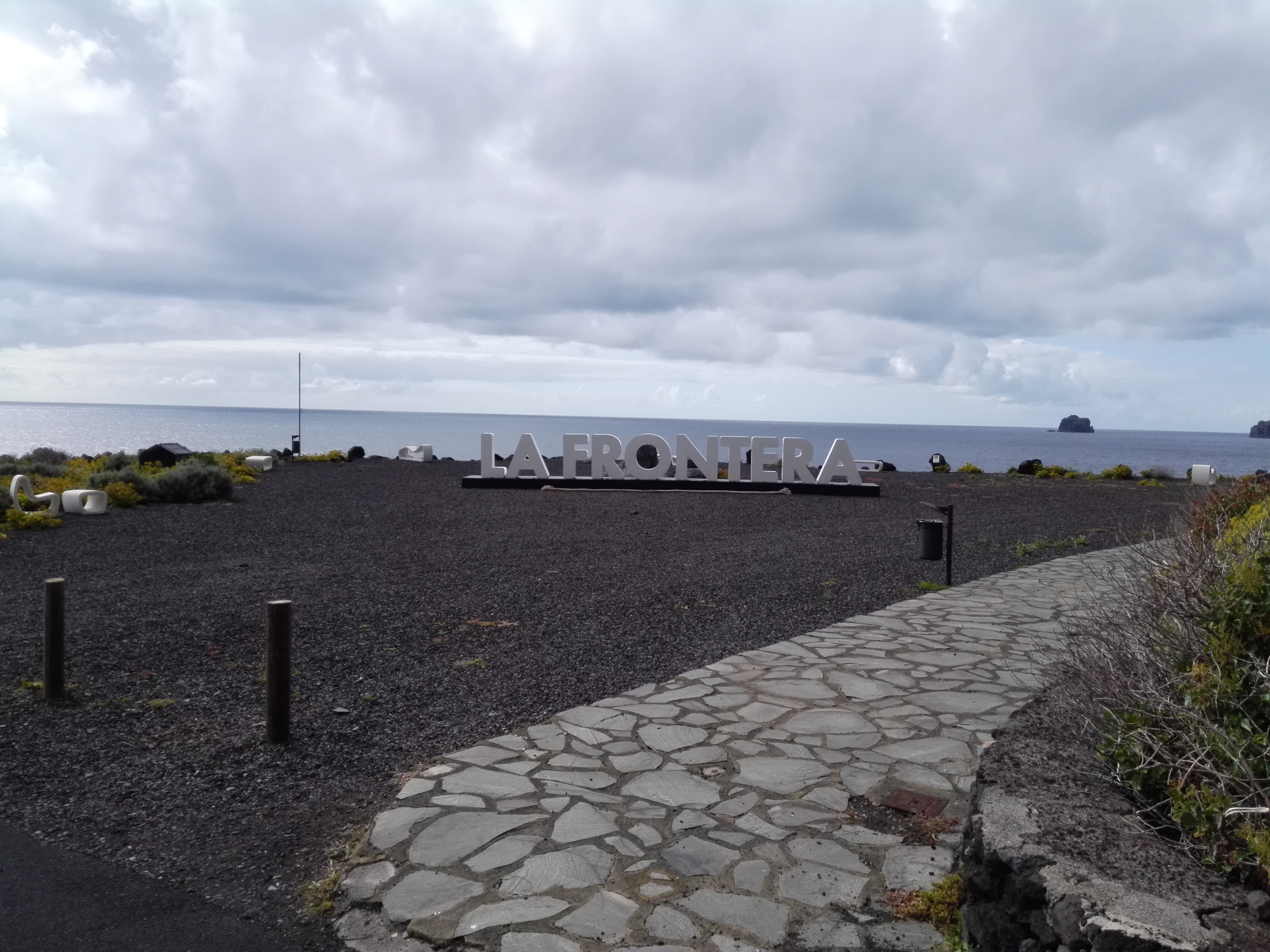

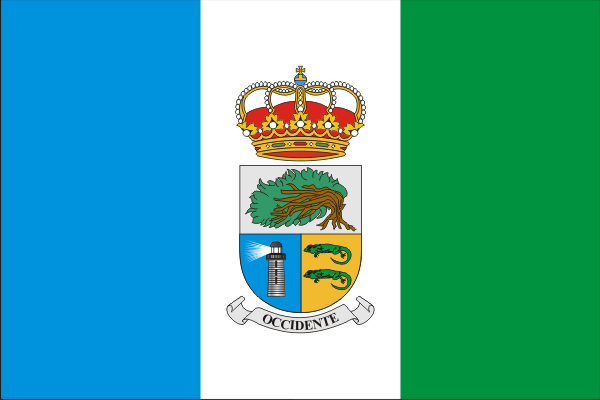
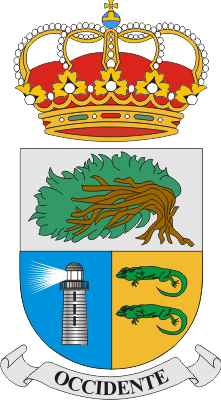
- Flag Coat of arms

- Location in the Canary Islands La Frontera (Spain, Canary Islands)
- Coordinates: 27°45′0″N 18°1′0″W
- Country: Spain
- Autonomous community: Canary Islands
- Province: Santa Cruz de Tenerife
- Island: El Hierro

Area
  - Total: 84.20 km^{2} (32.51 sq mi)
- Elevation: 300 m (980 ft)

Population (2025-01-01)
  - Total: 4,660
  - Density: 55.3/km^{2} (143/sq mi)
- Postal code: E-38911
- Climate: BSh
- Website: http://www.aytofrontera.org/

La Frontera (Spanish for "the border") is a municipality in the northwestern part of the island El Hierro, Santa Cruz de Tenerife, Canary Islands, Spain. In 2007, the southern part of the territory of La Frontera was split off to form the new municipality of El Pinar.

== Sites of interest ==
- Punta de la Orchilla – the lighthouse west of the municipality; after building taken to be the prime meridian, being the westernmost point of the known world – identified with the island at large by Ptolemy in the 2nd century AD. It was taken as one of two prime meridians by Cardinal Richelieu and hence scientists and cartographers under Louis XIII in 1634. Many 16th and 17th century international maps noted a co- or nominal only prime meridian here, among other contenders such as Rome or Paris. In 1884 the International Meridian Conference agreed to use the meridian of the Greenwich Royal Observatory as the standard prime meridian, which institution had carried out major work on the studies of longitude. Between these years the island bore an alternate name equally used, Isla del Meridiano (Meridian Island).
- La Dehesa - the hermitage of the Virgen de los Reyes, patron saint of the island whose feast day is 24 September, the statue of which is celebrated in a procession across every settlement of the island every four years on the first Saturday of July, examples being 2001, 2021 etc.

== Historical population ==
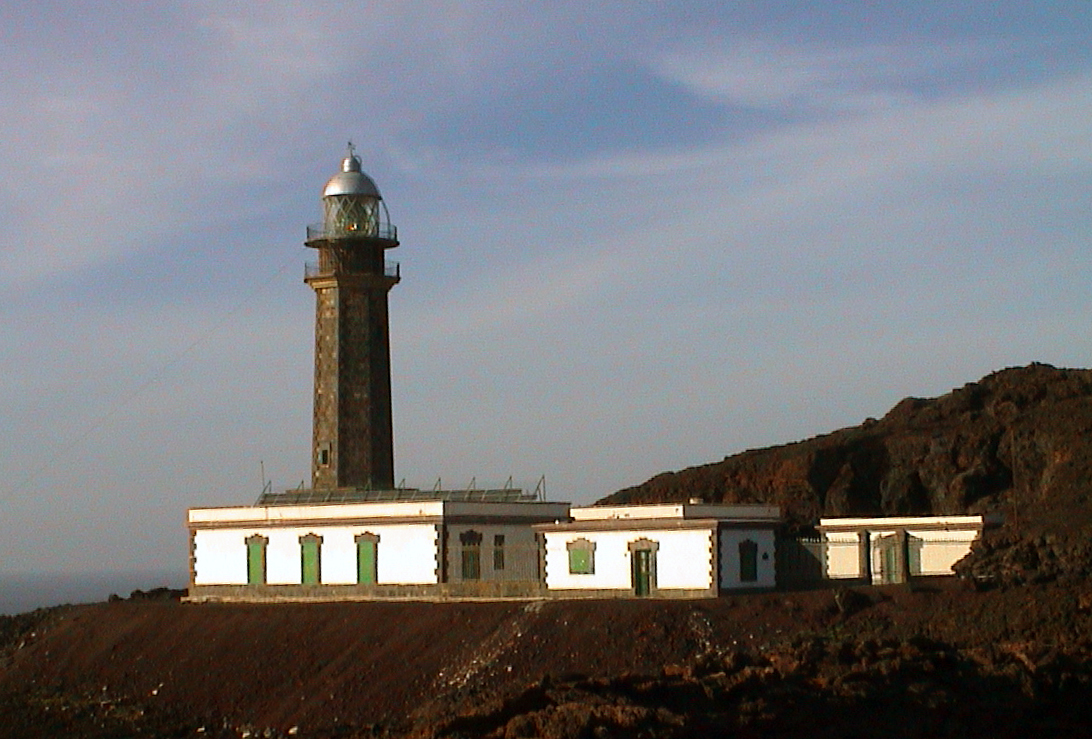
Lighthouse of Orchilla

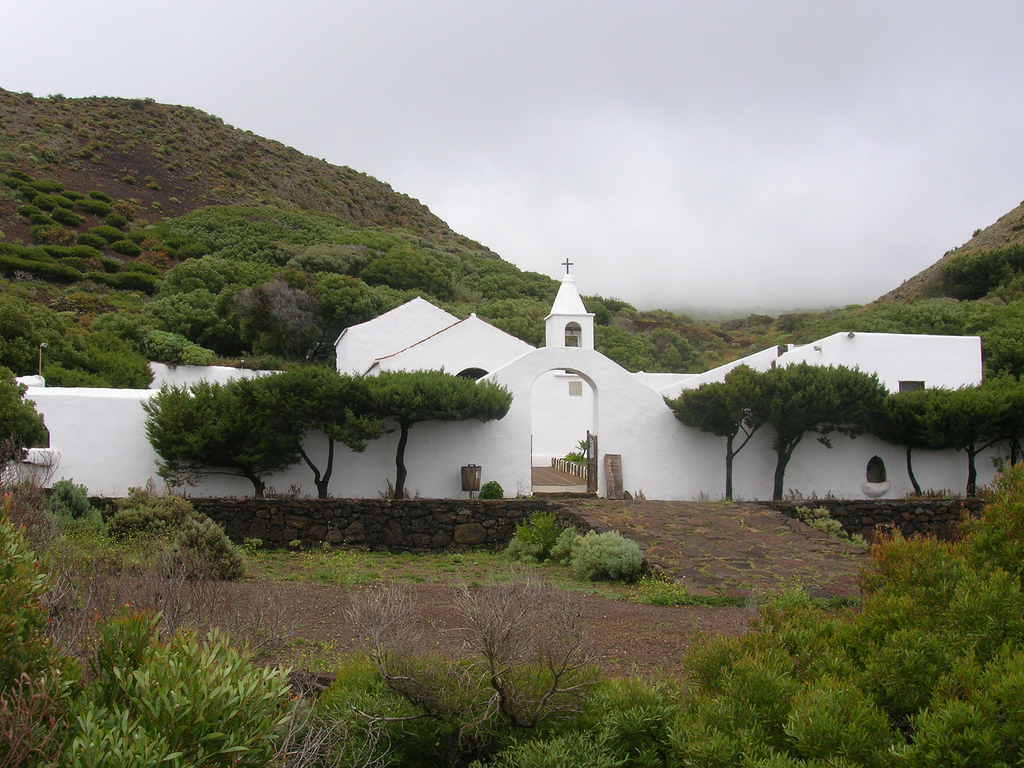
Virgen de los Reyes hermitage

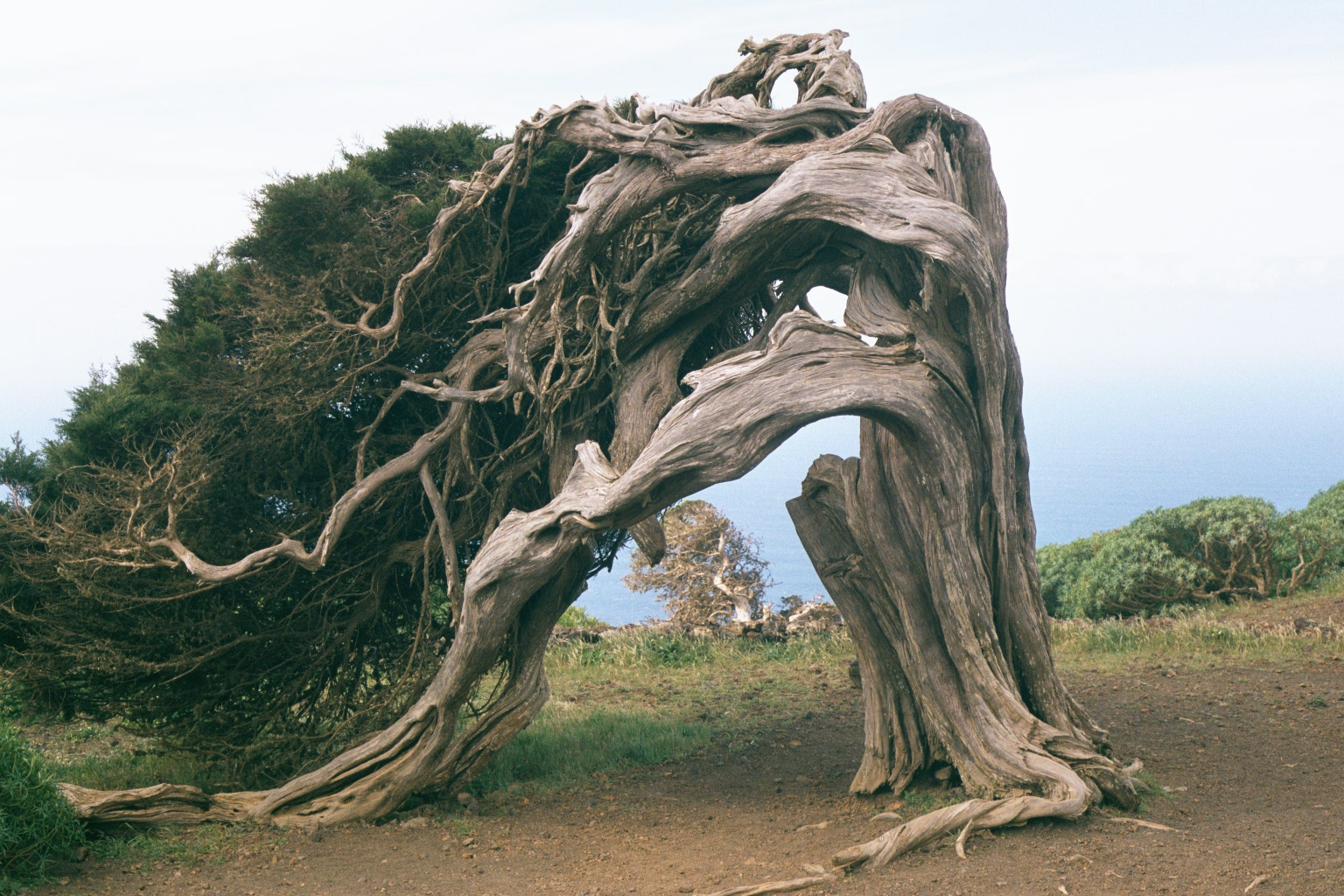
Phoenicean Juniper (Juniperus phoenicea) at El Sabinar, El Hierro, Canary Islands (Spain)

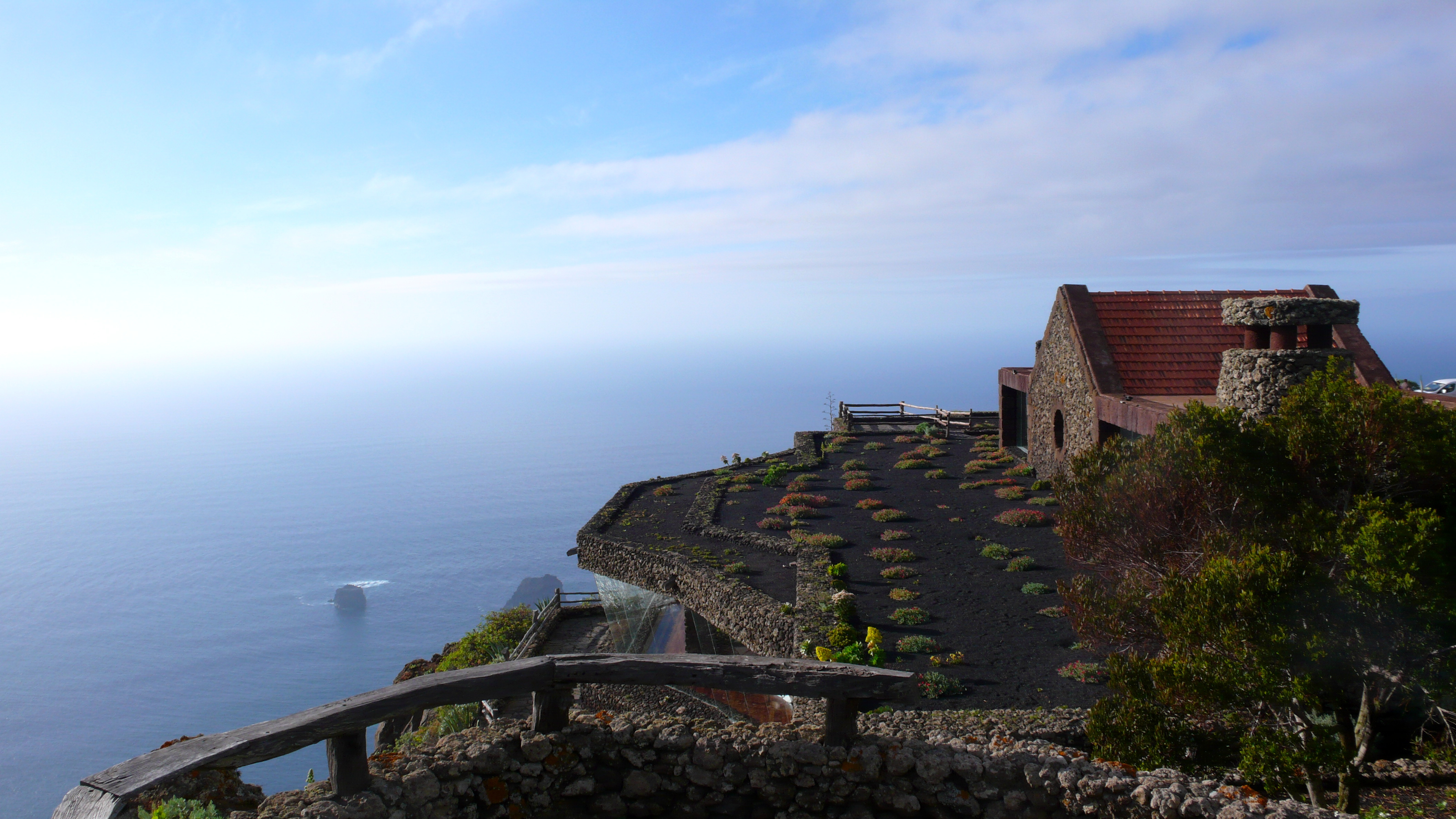
Mirador de la Peña, El Hierro

Year	Population
1991	3,612
1996	4,409
2001	4,455
2002	5,359
2003	5,435
2004	5,231
2013	4,058

== See also ==
- List of municipalities in Santa Cruz de Tenerife
- Pico de Malpaso
