= Orchilla =

Orchilla may refer to:

- La Orchila, an island
- "Orchella weeds," a lichen that is a source of a purple-blue dye extracted from orcein
- Punta Orchilla Lighthouse on El Hierro, in the Canary Islands
