= Pico de Malpaso =

Mountain in Spain

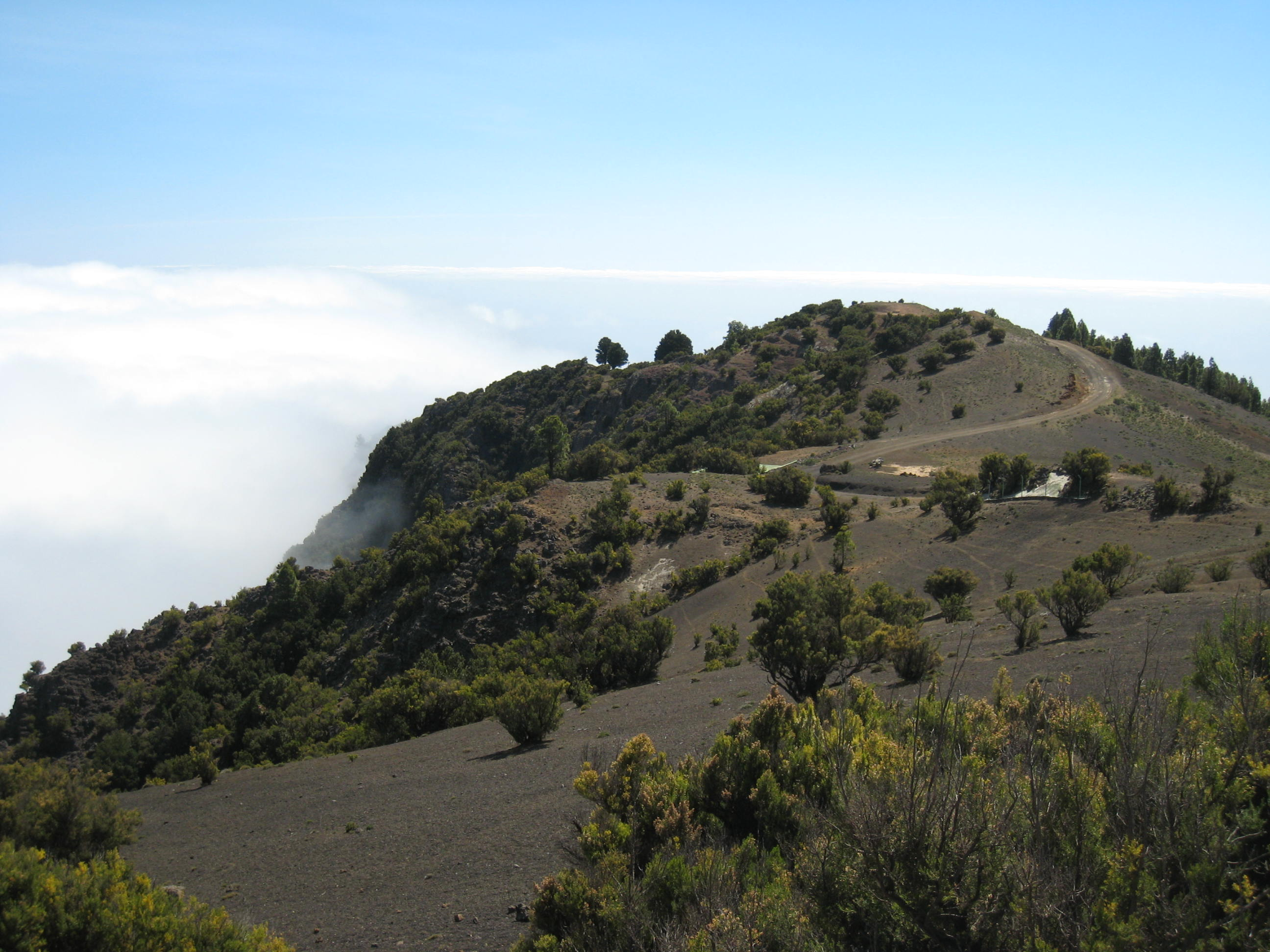

Highest point
- Elevation: 1,501 m (4,925 ft)
- Prominence: 1,501 m (4,925 ft)
- Listing: Ultra
- Coordinates: 27°43′46″N 18°02′26″W

Naming
- English translation: Difficult step peak
- Language of name: Spanish

Geography
- Location within Canary Islands
- Location: El Hierro, Canary Islands

Geology
- Mountain type: volcano

Climbing
- Easiest route: hike

Pico de Malpaso (English: "difficult step peak") is the highest point on the island of El Hierro in the Canary Islands, Spain.

== Geography ==
The summit rises at the centre of the island on the border between Frontera and El Pinar de El Hierro municipalities (Province of Santa Cruz de Tenerife). On the mountain's top, at an elevation of 1,501.762 m above sea level, is located a trig point.

From the mountain one can see the island of La Palma and others islands of Canary archipelago.

== Geology ==
The island of El Hierro is the youngest of the archipelago and is around 3 million years old. Its present shape is derived from the erosion on its volcanic cone.

== Environment ==
Malpaso slopes host woods and heaths with relevant samples of Canary Islands juniper (Juniperus cedrus), some of them said to be more than one thousand years old. The most important animal from a conservationist point of view is El Hierro giant lizard (in Spanish lagarto Salmor), an endangered species of reptile.

== See also ==
- List of European ultra prominent peaks

== Bibliography ==
- Hausen, Hans M. "Rasgos geológicos generales de la Isla del Hierro (Archipiélago Canario)". Anuario de Estudios Atlánticos. 1 (10): 547–594. ISSN 2386-5571.
- Media related to Malpaso at Wikimedia Commons
