= Cueva de Don Justo =

The Cueva de Don Justo (or Cave of Don Justo) is one of approximately 70 caves and volcanic galleries on the island of El Hierro in the Canaries.

The Cueva de Don Justo is over 6 kilometres (3.7 mi) in length, the cave is located in the El Lajial pahoehoe lava field near the Orchilla lighthouse in the south of El Hierro, it is a wild cave that extends around the Irama mountain (also called Prim mountain) for a total distance of 1,360 metres (4,460 ft) (with the parallel passages making up the extra distance). It was first explored and mapped by a speleological expedition in 1961, with further expeditions in 1974, 1976, and 1978, before the 1979 expedition completed the mapping of the 6,315 metres (20,719 ft) of cave system. It is the longest of 28 known lava tubes on El Hierro, and the 3rd longest lava tube in the Canary Islands, and the 13th longest in the world.

The cave has a maximum depth of 135 to 140 metres (460 ft) and at some points has up to 8 passages running in parallel. The cave contains well developed troglobitic fauna including seven species of troglobitic fauna exclusively found in this cave. The Cave is gated to protect these species, and is closed for tourists.
