= Punta Orchilla Lighthouse =

Lighthouse on El Hierro, Spain

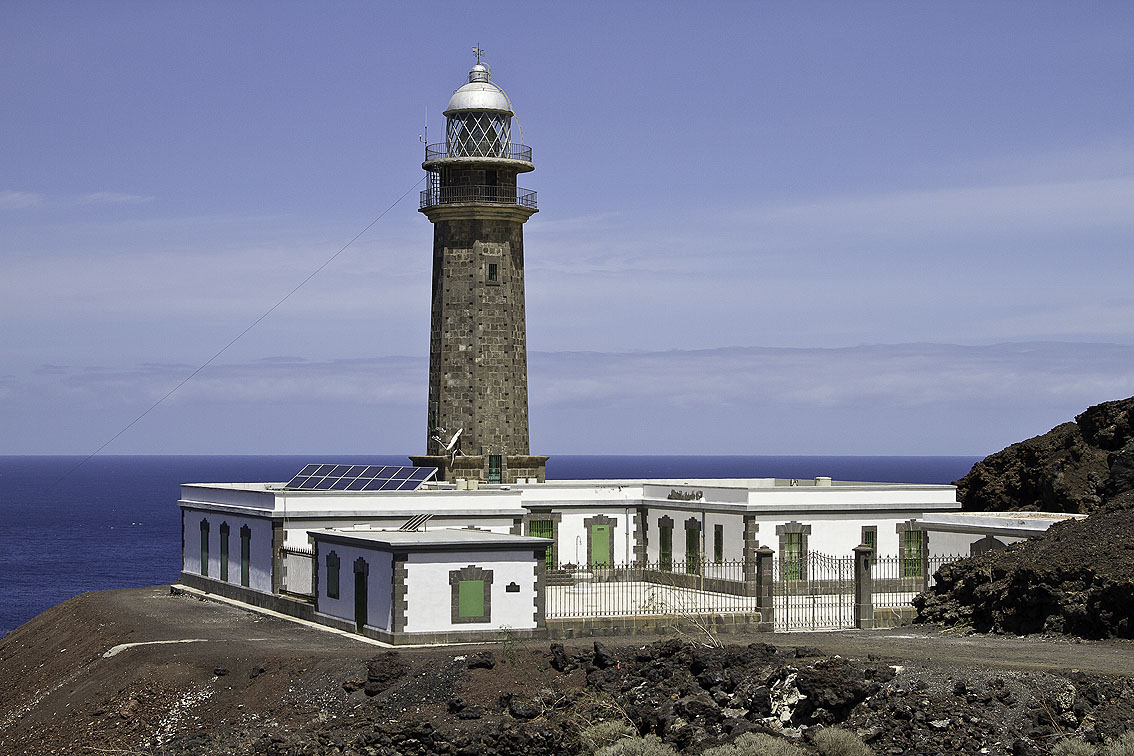
- Location: El Pinar; El Hierro; Canary Islands; Spain
- Coordinates: 27.706665°N 18.147496°W

Tower
- Constructed: 1933
- Construction: stone tower
- Height: 25 metres (82 ft)
- Shape: octagonal tower with double balcony and lantern
- Markings: unpainted tower, grey lantern
- Power source: solar power
- Operator: Autoridad Portuaria de Santa Cruz de Tenerife
- Heritage: Bien de Interés Cultural

Light
- Focal height: 132 metres (433 ft)
- Range: 24 nautical miles (44 km; 28 mi)
- Characteristic: L 0 3 oc 4 7
- Spain no.: ES-13060

The Punta Orchilla Lighthouse (Spanish: Faro de Punta Orchilla) is an active lighthouse on the Canary island of El Hierro in the municipality of El Pinar. The need for a lighthouse on the island was highlighted in the second maritime lighting plan for the Canaries, and it first became operational in 1933.

== Punta de la Orchilla ==
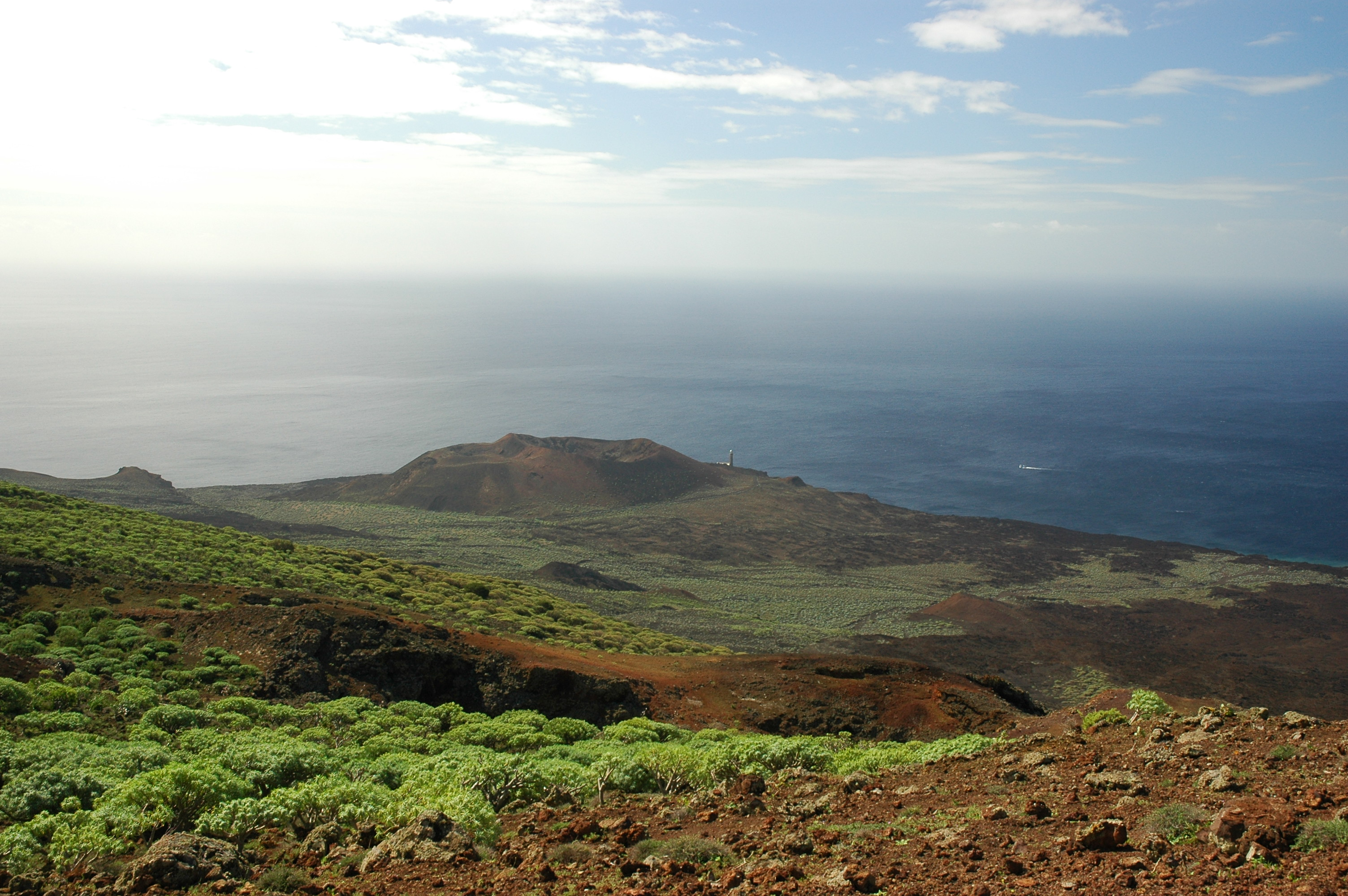
Punta Orchilla with the lighthouse in the distance

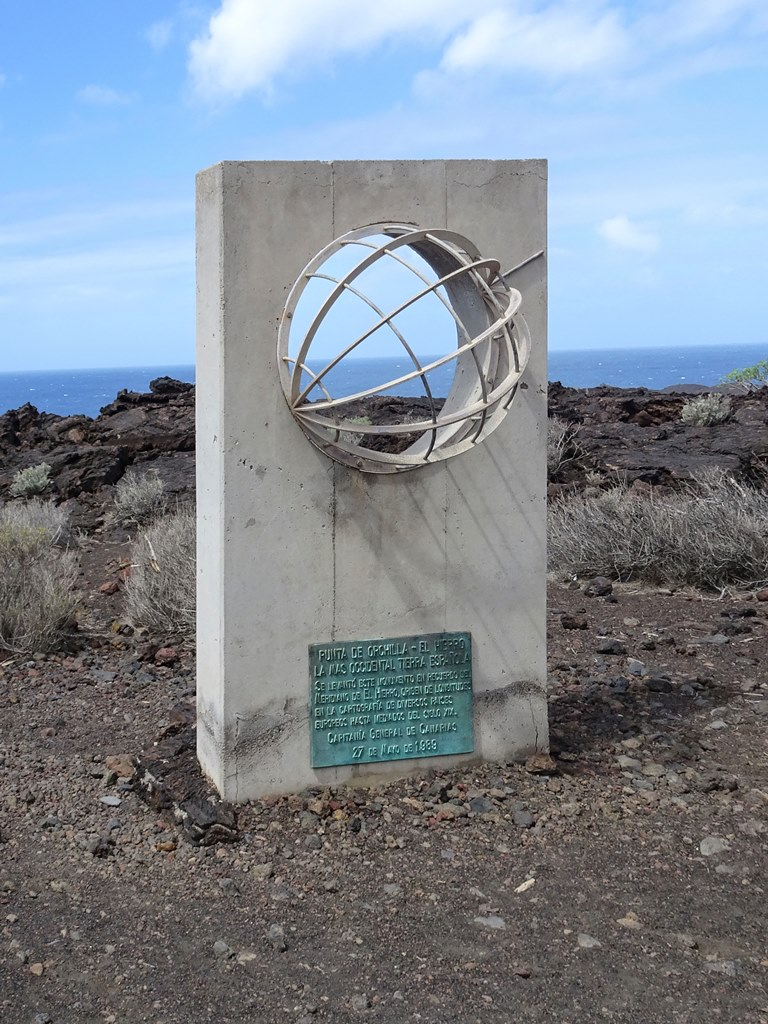
Ferro Meridian Memorial

Punta de la Orchilla on the south-western side of El Hierro, is a significant location in terms of the Canaries, as it is one of the most westerly points in the archipelago. A meridian memorial close to the lighthouse, is a reminder that historically it was considered to be a prime meridian for early map makers, and was known as the Ferro Meridian, at the western extremity of the known world.

The name comes from the Orchil lichen that grows on the rocky lava slopes in the area, inland from the point is a 238 m peak called Orchilla.

The isolated locality of the Punta de la Orchilla means that it has been described as "probably Spain's most remote lighthouse", reaching the site requires a 25 km trip from Sabinosa via a road that is only partly metalled, the end of the road being both unmade, and uneven. Although the site is accessible, the tower and buildings are closed.

== History ==
The lighthouse first entered service in 1933, and was built in a similar style to other earlier Canarian lights, and consists of a whitewashed single storey house, with dark volcanic rock used for the masonry detailing. A plain masonry tower with a substantial base rises from the side of the house facing the Atlantic Ocean. The 25 m high octagonal tower supports twin galleries and a lantern dome, which contains a first order Fresnel lens. With a focal height of 132 m above sea level, its light can be seen for 24 nautical miles.

In 2008, Punta Orchilla in conjunction with five other lighthouses was depicted in a set of six commemorative stamps by the Spanish postal service Correos.

== See also ==
- List of lighthouses in Spain
- List of lighthouses in the Canary Islands
