= El Pinar del Hierro =

El Pinar
- Municipality
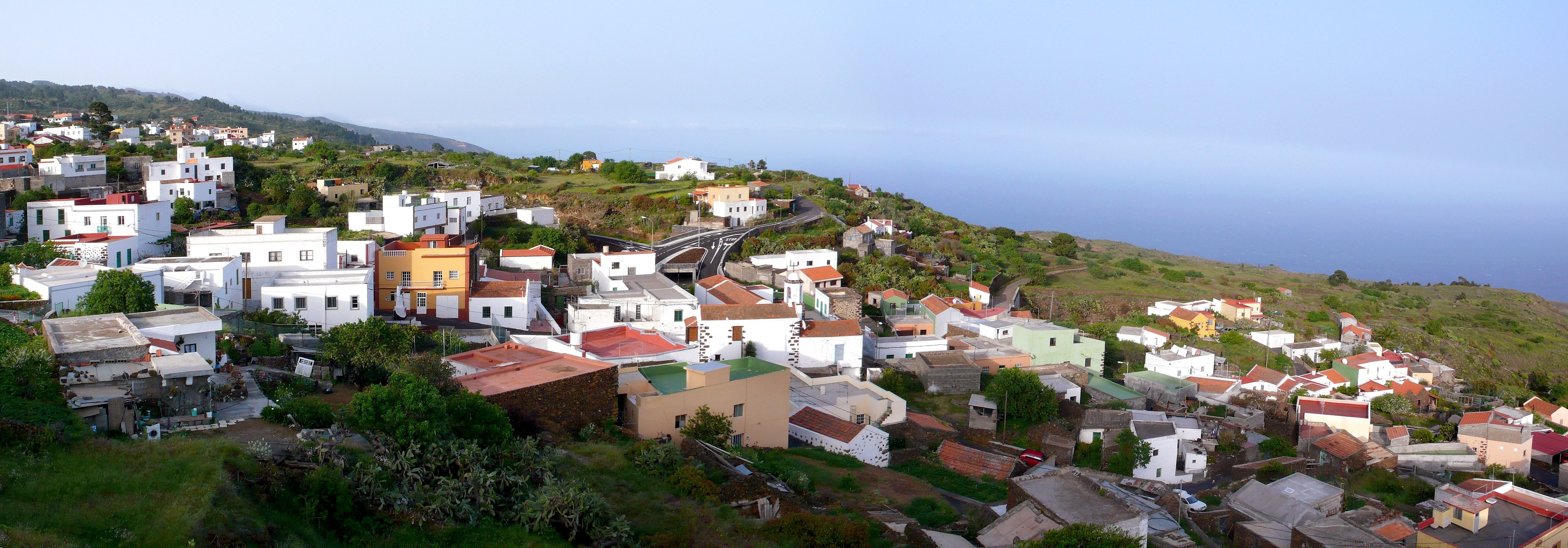

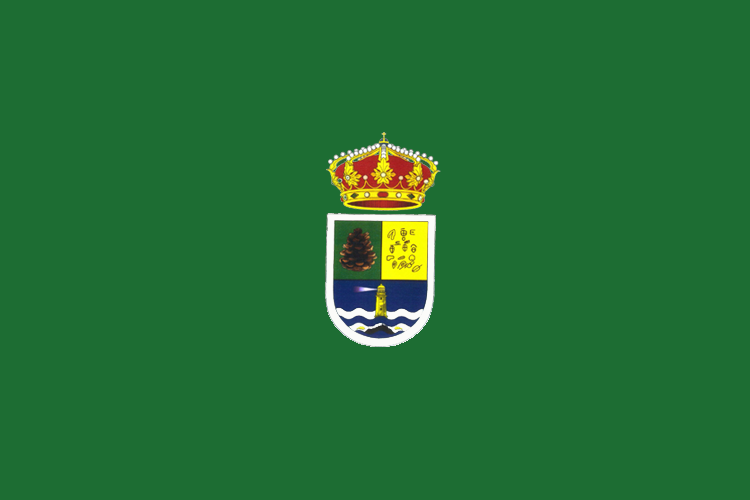
- Flag Coat of arms

- Location in the Canary Islands El Pinar (Spain, Canary Islands)
- Coordinates: 27°45′05″N 17°58′48″W
- Country: Spain
- Autonomous community: Canary Islands
- Province: Santa Cruz de Tenerife
- Island: El Hierro

Area
  - Total: 80.66 km^{2} (31.14 sq mi)

Population (2025-01-01)
  - Total: 2,042
  - Density: 25.32/km^{2} (65.57/sq mi)
- Climate: Csb

El Pinar (Spanish: El Pinar de El Hierro) is a Spanish municipality on the island of El Hierro (nicknamed Isla del Meridiano, the "Meridian Island"), Canary Islands. It was created in 2007.

== Sites of interest ==
At the western end of El Pinar is the Punta Orchilla lighthouse which was completed in 1933.

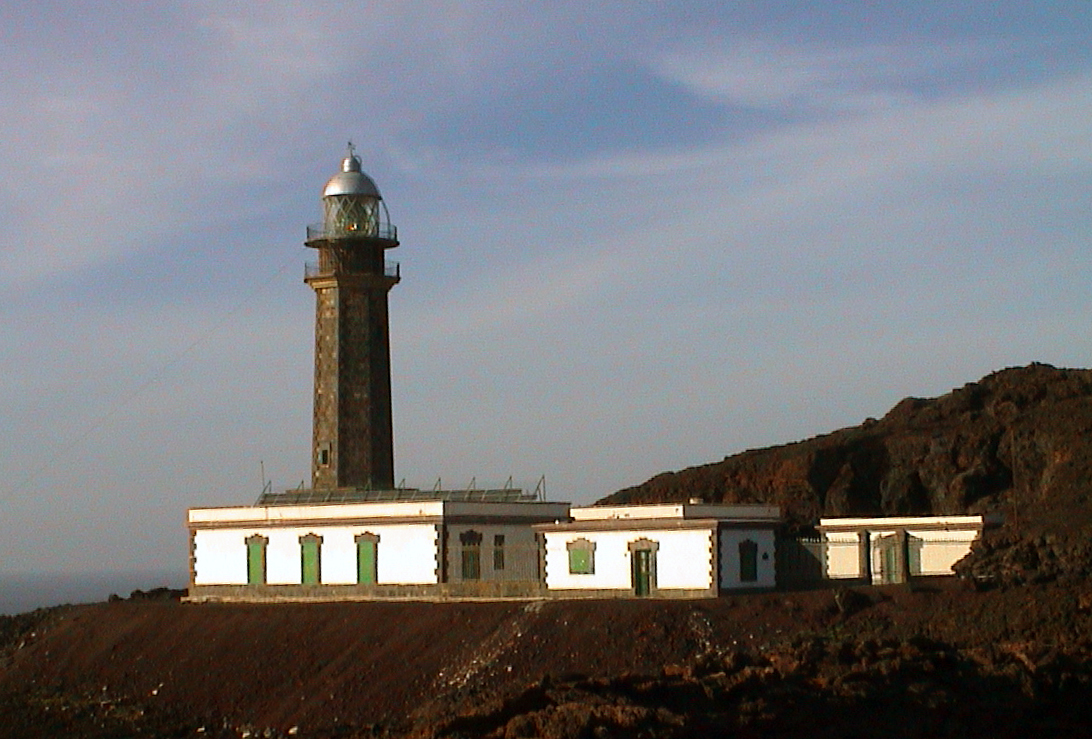
Punta Orchilla lighthouse

== See also ==
- Pico de Malpaso
