= El Hierro =

Southwesternmost of the Canary Islands

Nickname: Isla del Meridiano
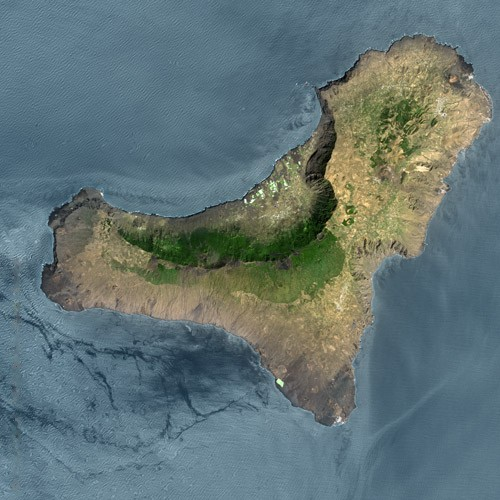

- Location of El Hierro in the Canary Islands

Geography
- Location: Atlantic Ocean
- Coordinates: 27°45′N 18°00′W
- Archipelago: Canary Islands
- Area: 268.51 km^{2} (103.67 sq mi)
- Highest elevation: 1,501 m (4925 ft)
- Highest point: Pico de Malpaso

Administration
- Spain
- Autonomous Community: Canary Islands
- Province: Santa Cruz de Tenerife
- Capital city: Valverde

Demographics
- Population: 11,659 (start of 2023)
- Pop. density: 43.4/km^{2} (112.4/sq mi)
- Languages: Spanish, specifically Canarian Spanish

Additional information
- Time zone: WET (UTC±00:00)
  - Summer (DST): WEST (UTC+01:00)

Flag of El Hierro

El Hierro (pronounced [el ˈʝero]; lit. 'The Iron'), nicknamed Isla del Meridiano (pronounced [ˈizla ðel meɾiˈðjano]; lit. 'Meridian Island'), is the southernmost and westernmost of the Canary Islands (an autonomous community of Spain), in the Atlantic Ocean off the coast of Africa, with a population of 11,659 (2023). Its capital is Valverde. At 268.51 square kilometres (103.67 sq mi), it is the second-smallest of the eight inhabited islands of the Canaries, with La Graciosa being the smallest.

== Name ==
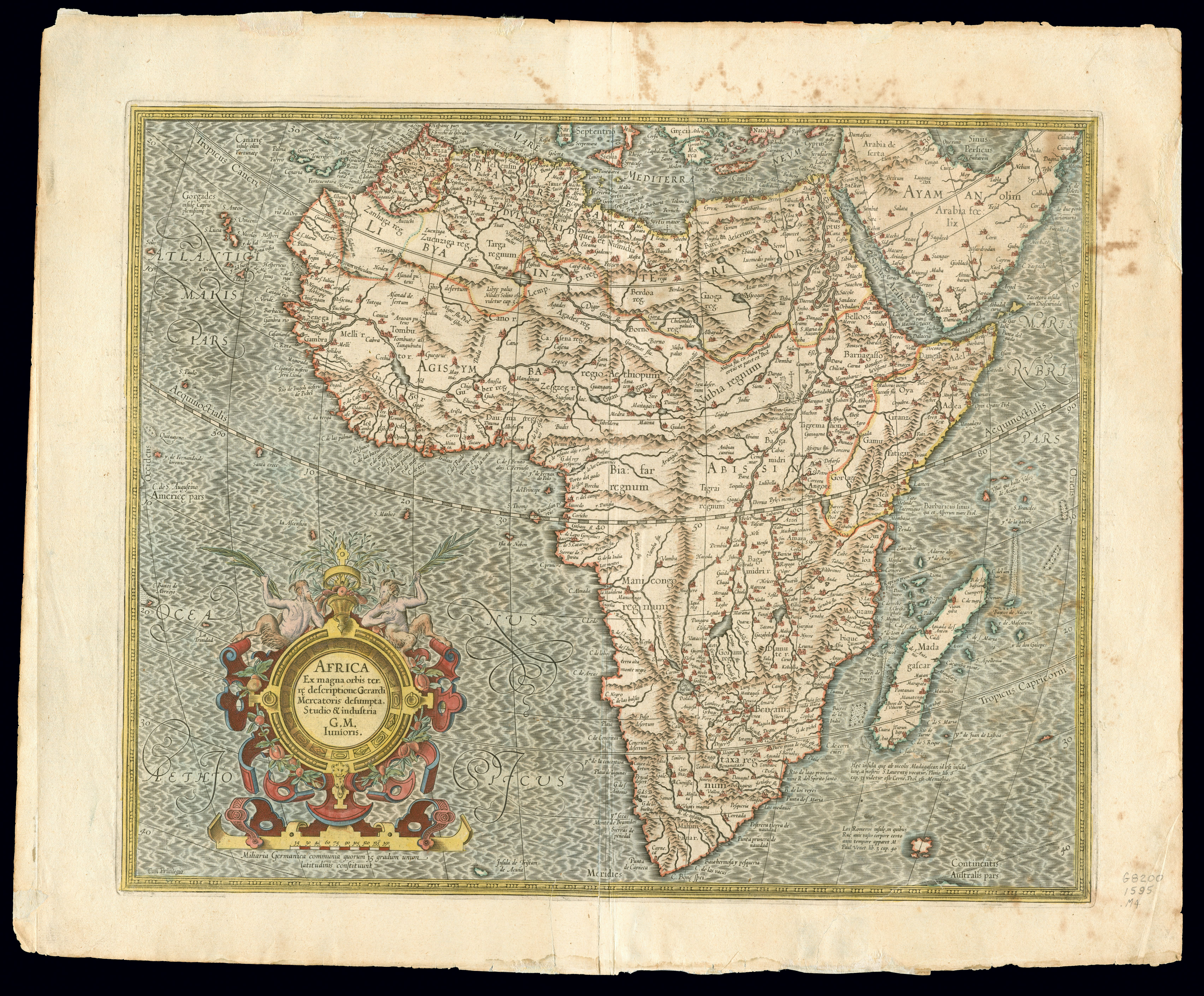
Africa by Gerardus Mercator 1595. 'Fierro' is not yet on the prime meridian, although it is close.

The name El Hierro, although spelled like the Spanish word for 'iron', is not related to that word. The H in the name of the metal is derived from the F of Latin ferrum (compare higo for 'fig'), a phonetic mutation that was complete by the end of the Middle Ages.

The confusion with the name of the metal had effects on the international naming of the island. As early as the 16th century, maps and texts called the island after the word for 'iron' in other languages: Portuguese Ferro, French l'île de Fer, and Latin Insula Ferri.

Nevertheless, the origin of the name ero or erro or yerro is not definitely known. It is thought to be derived from one of several words in the Guanche language of the pre-Hispanic inhabitants, known as Bimbaches. Juan de Abreu Galindo (in a manuscript translated and published by George Glas in 1764) gives the native name of the island as Esero (or Eseró), meaning 'strong'. Richard Henry Major, however, in notes on his translation of Le Canarien, observes that the Guanche word hero or herro, meaning 'cistern', could easily have lapsed into hierro by a process of folk etymology. It is believed that the Bimbaches had to construct cisterns to save fresh rainwater. The Gran diccionario guanche gives the meaning of the Guanche word hero in Spanish as "fuente" ('spring [water source]').

== History ==
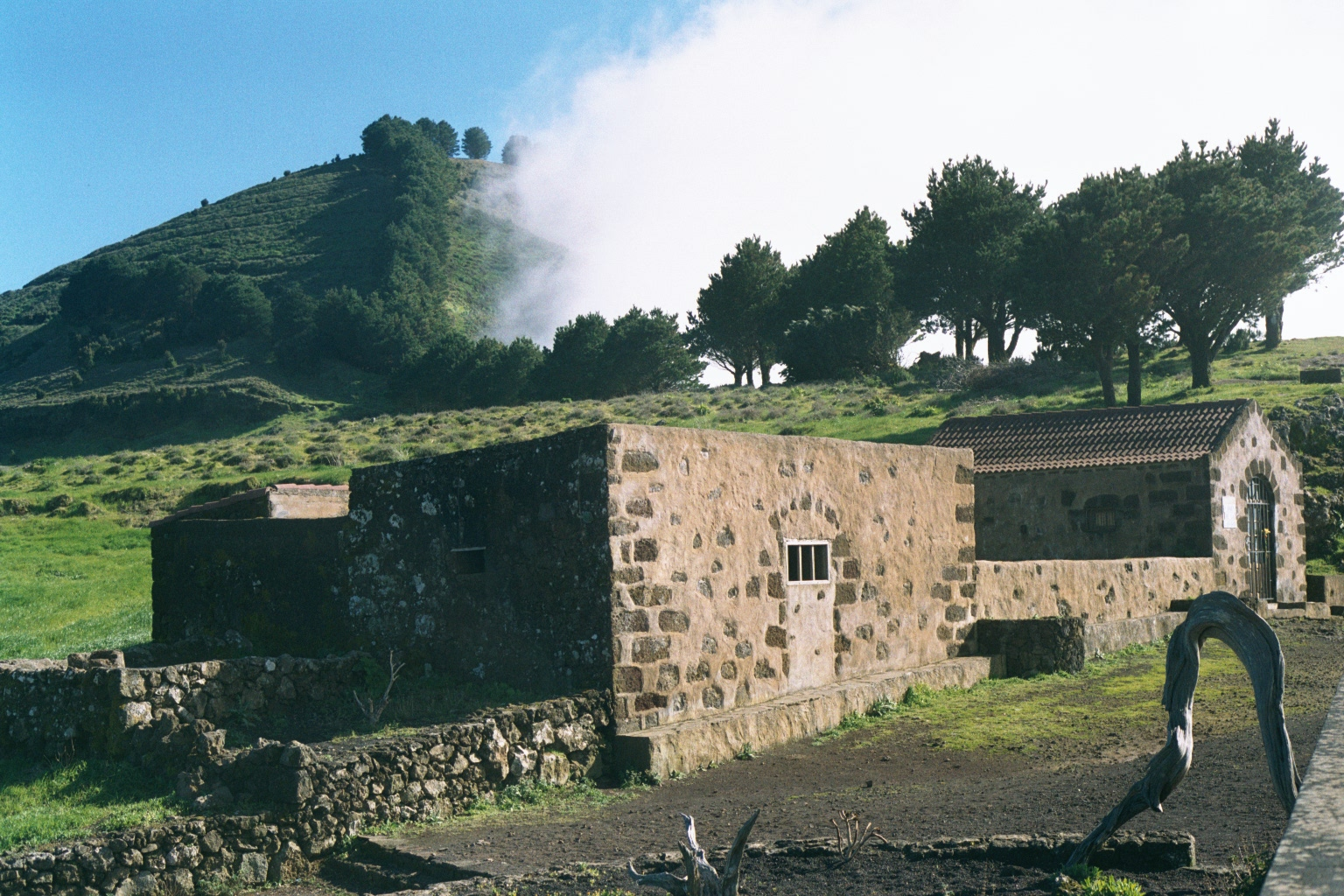
Virgen de la Caridad Chapel

The ancient natives of the island, called Bimbaches, were subjected to Spanish rule by Jean de Béthencourt (d.1425) – more by the process of negotiation than by military action. Béthencourt had as his ally and negotiator Augeron, brother of the island's native monarch. Augeron had been captured years before by the Europeans and now served as mediator between the Europeans and the Guanches. In return for control over the island, Béthencourt promised to respect the liberty of the natives, but his son eventually broke his promise, selling many of the bimbaches into slavery. Many Frenchmen and Galicians subsequently settled on the island. There was a revolt of the natives against the harsh treatment of the governor Lázaro Vizcaíno, but it was suppressed.

=== Landslides and tsunami ===
There is evidence of at least three major landslides that have affected El Hierro in the last few hundred thousand years. The most recent of these was the 'El Golfo' landslide that occurred about 15,000 years ago, involving collapse of the northern flank of the island. The landslide formed the El Golfo valley and created a debris avalanche with a volume of 150 to 180 km^{3} (36 to 43 cu mi). Turbidite deposits related to this landslide have been recognized in drill cores from the Agadir Basin to the north of the Canary Islands. Detailed analysis of these deposits suggests that the slope failure did not occur as a single event but a series of smaller failures over a period of hours or days. Local tsunami are likely to have been triggered by these landslides but no evidence has been found to confirm this.

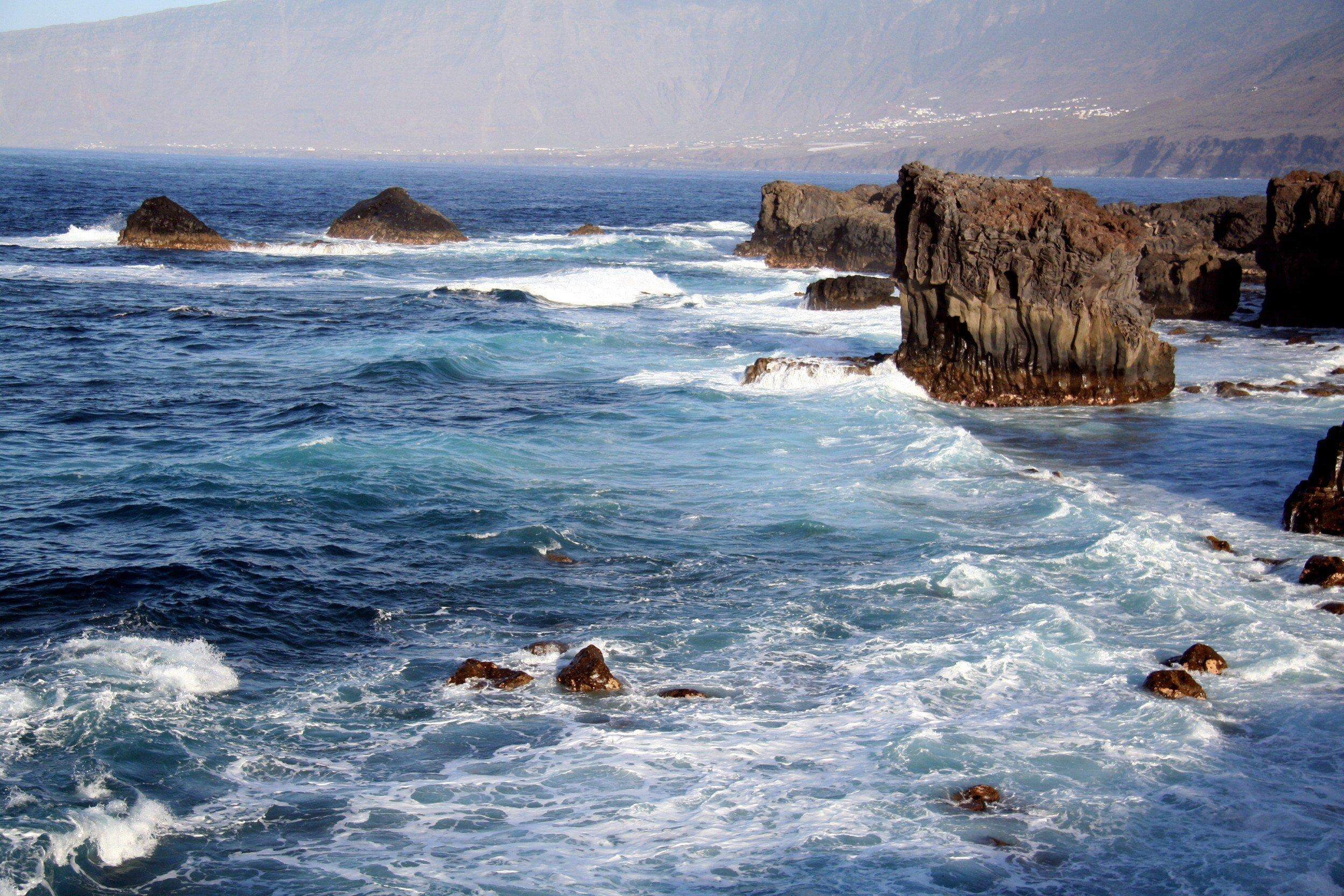
Coast El Golfo, El Hierro

=== 2011 seismic activity ===
The Instituto Vulcanológico de Canarias (Volcanological Institute of the Canary Islands) and National Geographic Institute's seismic monitoring station located in Valverde detected increased seismic activity beginning on 17 July 2011. The seismic monitoring network was increased in density on 21 July to allow better detection and location of the seismic events. There was an earthquake swarm with in excess of 400 minor tremors between 20 July and 24 July; by 27 July a further 320 earthquakes had been recorded. On 25 August there were reports that some horizontal deformation had been detected, but that there was no unusual vertical deformation. At that time, the total number of tremors had exceeded 4,000. By the end of September, the tremors had increased in frequency and intensity, with experts fearing landslides affecting the town of La Frontera, and also a small possibility of a volcanic eruption through a new vent. Emergency services evacuated several families in the areas at most risk, and made plans to evacuate the island if necessary. Between 4;15 and 4:20 a.m. on 10 October 2011 the earthquake swarm changed behaviour and produced a harmonic tremor. Harmonic tremors are produced by magma movements and can indicate that an eruption has begun. Later the same day a small submarine eruption began, 7 km (4.3 mi) south of La Restinga. On 11 October the volcanic threat level at La Restinga was raised from "yellow" to "red" after minor rockfalls on the slopes above the town. Temporary evacuation of the 600 inhabitants was ordered and, despite a reduction in activity, they were still unable to return 20 days later. As of 7 November 2011 a confirmed surtseyan type of eruption phase has started at the fissure. On 4 December 2011 the eruption was ongoing with vigorous phreatic bubbles emerging. After the 2011 eruption, fossils of single-celled marine organisms were found in restingolites, a type of tephra, that were released into the water.

== Climate ==
The precise climate of El Hierro depends on the area. The climate ranges are from subtropical Mediterranean (Csa / Csb) in the center of the island, to semi-arid (BSh) and to a desert climate (BWh) in coastal sections (according to the Köppen climate classification). It also has tropical climate (As) influences on some areas, as the coldest month average temperature does not fall below 18 °C (64 °F), but as precipitation is very low, the arid/semi-arid climate overlaps with the tropical climate, and therefore, its official classification according to AEMET is semi-arid or arid, depending on the exact area of the island. The temperatures are greatly influenced by the ocean. This is the climate chart from El Hierro Airport, which is the only airport in the island:

Climate data for El Hierro Airport WMO ID: 60001; Climate ID: C929I; coordinates 27°49′08″N 17°53′20″W; elevation: 32 m (105 ft); 1991–2020 provisional normals, (Note: Mean monthly maxima and minima (i.e. the highest and lowest temperature readings during an entire month or year) calculated based on data at said location from 1991 to 2020.) extremes 1973–present
Month	Jan	Feb	Mar	Apr	May	Jun	Jul	Aug	Sep	Oct	Nov	Dec	Year
Record high °C (°F)	28.5 (83.3)	29.4 (84.9)	32.6 (90.7)	33.2 (91.8)	31.4 (88.5)	32.0 (89.6)	32.4 (90.3)	33.8 (92.8)	33.6 (92.5)	35.4 (95.7)	32.6 (90.7)	28.3 (82.9)	35.4 (95.7)
Mean maximum °C (°F)	23.8 (74.8)	24.2 (75.6)	25.4 (77.7)	25.0 (77.0)	26.1 (79.0)	26.7 (80.1)	27.6 (81.7)	28.4 (83.1)	28.8 (83.8)	29.3 (84.7)	27.3 (81.1)	24.9 (76.8)	30.8 (87.4)
Mean daily maximum °C (°F)	21.0 (69.8)	20.8 (69.4)	21.2 (70.2)	21.8 (71.2)	22.8 (73.0)	24.1 (75.4)	25.1 (77.2)	26.1 (79.0)	26.5 (79.7)	25.8 (78.4)	23.7 (74.7)	22.1 (71.8)	23.4 (74.1)
Daily mean °C (°F)	19.1 (66.4)	18.8 (65.8)	19.2 (66.6)	19.7 (67.5)	20.7 (69.3)	22.1 (71.8)	23.1 (73.6)	24.1 (75.4)	24.5 (76.1)	23.7 (74.7)	21.9 (71.4)	20.2 (68.4)	21.4 (70.5)
Mean daily minimum °C (°F)	17.0 (62.6)	16.8 (62.2)	17.1 (62.8)	17.5 (63.5)	18.6 (65.5)	20.0 (68.0)	21.2 (70.2)	22.1 (71.8)	22.4 (72.3)	21.6 (70.9)	19.9 (67.8)	18.2 (64.8)	19.4 (66.9)
Mean minimum °C (°F)	14.3 (57.7)	14.3 (57.7)	14.7 (58.5)	15.2 (59.4)	16.8 (62.2)	18.5 (65.3)	19.8 (67.6)	20.8 (69.4)	20.5 (68.9)	19.1 (66.4)	17.1 (62.8)	15.6 (60.1)	13.0 (55.4)
Record low °C (°F)	8.0 (46.4)	9.0 (48.2)	9.2 (48.6)	10.0 (50.0)	10.0 (50.0)	10.0 (50.0)	14.0 (57.2)	14.2 (57.6)	15.2 (59.4)	11.0 (51.8)	12.0 (53.6)	9.6 (49.3)	8.0 (46.4)
Average precipitation mm (inches)	27.5 (1.08)	24.9 (0.98)	20.2 (0.80)	14.3 (0.56)	2.6 (0.10)	1.5 (0.06)	0.2 (0.01)	1.2 (0.05)	3.5 (0.14)	17.6 (0.69)	30.7 (1.21)	41.3 (1.63)	185.3 (7.30)
Average precipitation days (≥ 1 mm)	3.4	3.1	2.8	1.9	0.8	0.4	0.1	0.4	0.7	2.9	3.6	4.3	24.3
Average relative humidity (%)	71	72	72	73	72	74	76	77	75	74	72	71	73
Mean monthly sunshine hours	161	170	208	222	257	255	242	248	231	205	159	155	2,520
Percentage possible sunshine	49	54	56	58	62	61	57	61	63	57	49	48	56
Source: State Meteorological Agency/AEMET OpenData

Climate data for Hierro Airport, 1981-2010 normals
Month	Jan	Feb	Mar	Apr	May	Jun	Jul	Aug	Sep	Oct	Nov	Dec	Year
Mean daily maximum °C (°F)	20.9 (69.6)	20.8 (69.4)	21.4 (70.5)	21.6 (70.9)	22.6 (72.7)	24.0 (75.2)	25.0 (77.0)	26.1 (79.0)	26.5 (79.7)	25.6 (78.1)	23.7 (74.7)	22.2 (72.0)	23.3 (73.9)
Daily mean °C (°F)	18.8 (65.8)	18.6 (65.5)	19.0 (66.2)	19.3 (66.7)	20.3 (68.5)	21.7 (71.1)	22.8 (73.0)	23.7 (74.7)	24.1 (75.4)	23.3 (73.9)	21.6 (70.9)	20.0 (68.0)	21.1 (70.0)
Mean daily minimum °C (°F)	16.6 (61.9)	16.4 (61.5)	16.7 (62.1)	17.0 (62.6)	17.9 (64.2)	19.3 (66.7)	20.5 (68.9)	21.3 (70.3)	21.7 (71.1)	20.9 (69.6)	19.5 (67.1)	17.8 (64.0)	18.7 (65.7)
Average precipitation mm (inches)	28 (1.1)	38 (1.5)	25 (1.0)	13 (0.5)	2 (0.1)	1 (0.0)	0 (0)	1 (0.0)	3 (0.1)	14 (0.6)	37 (1.5)	44 (1.7)	206 (8.1)
Average precipitation days (≥ 1.0 mm)	3.1	2.7	2.8	1.5	0.7	0.3	0.0	0.3	0.6	2.5	3.3	4.6	22.5
Average relative humidity (%)	74	76	74	74	74	75	77	78	77	76	74	74	75
Mean monthly sunshine hours	140	157	192	204	243	242	221	239	215	194	152	139	2,382
Source: Agencia Estatal de Meteorología

== Geography, flora and fauna ==
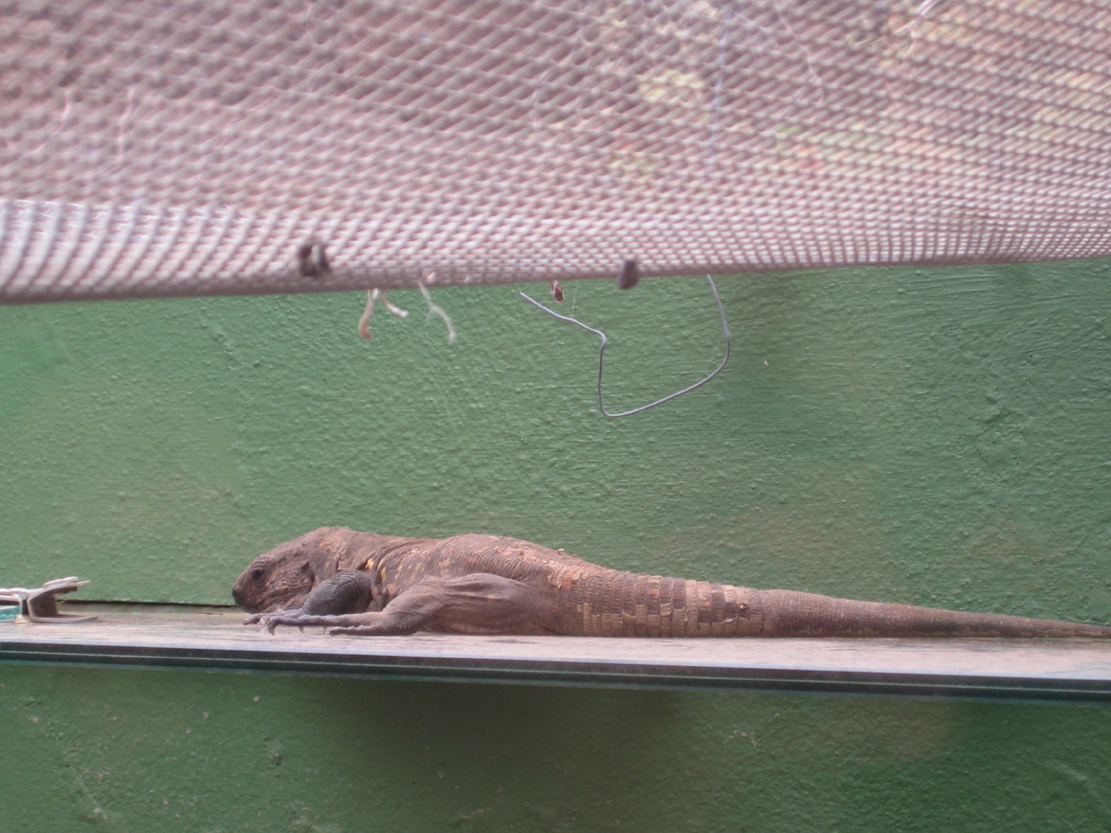
El Hierro giant lizard

El Hierro's size and geography supports entirely endemic species including the critically endangered El Hierro giant lizard (Gallotia simonyi), for which there is a captive breeding programme, allowing its reintroduction.

The non-barren parts of the interior rely on relief precipitation, not much more than the average of 19 rainfall days per year, high relative humidity and geothermal springs. These non-arid parts have thermophilous (geothermal heat-liking) juniper clumps and a pine forest with other evergreens. In 2000, El Hierro was designated by UNESCO as a Biosphere Reserve, with 60% of its territory protected to preserve its natural and cultural diversity. Among cetaceans in these waters, it is notable that several species of lesser known beaked whales inhabit around the island.

Like the rest of the Canary Islands chain, El Hierro is volcanic and sharply mountainous. One eruption has to date been recorded on the island, but is not confirmed: from the Volcan de Lomo Negro vent in 1793, lasting a month. A submarine eruption occurred, however, offshore La Restinga village in 2011/2012. Except as landscaped at its harbour towns the shore is rocky and in places precipitous.

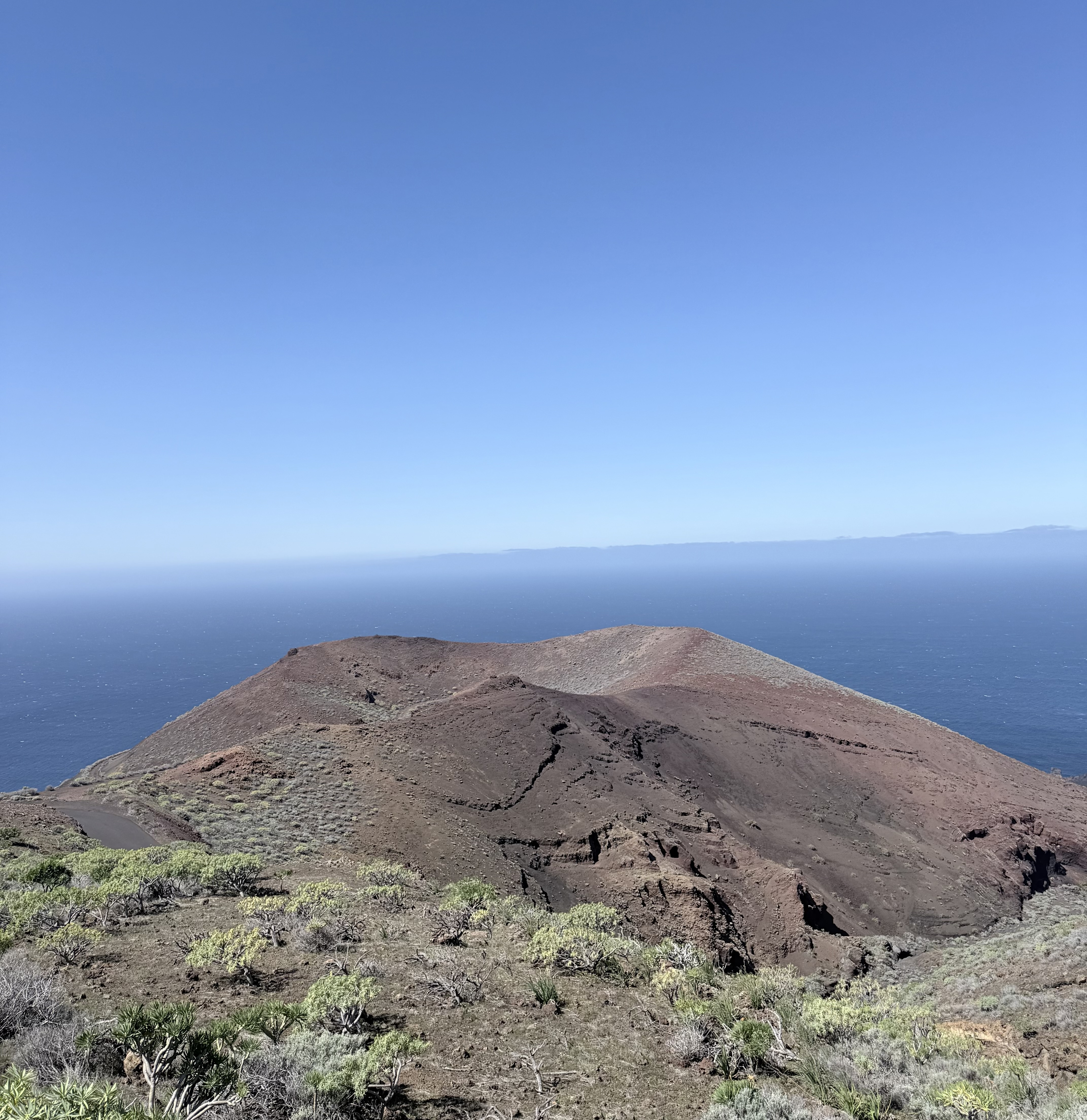
Montaña de los Charcos

El Hierro is a 268.71-square-kilometre (103.75 sq mi) island, formed late, about 1.2 million years ago after three successive eruptions, the island emerged from the ocean as a triangle of basaltic dykes topped with a volcanic cone more than 2,000 metres (6,562 ft) high. Continued activity resulted in the island expanding to have the largest number of volcanoes in the Canaries (over 500 cones, another 300 covered by more recent deposits), together with approximately 70 caves and volcanic galleries, including the Cueva de Don Justo whose collection of channels exceeds 6 km. Landslides, plant erosion and seasonal wind erosion have reduced the size and height of the island. The current highest point is in the middle of the island, in Malpaso, at 1,501 metres (4,925 ft) high.

== Tourism and transportation ==
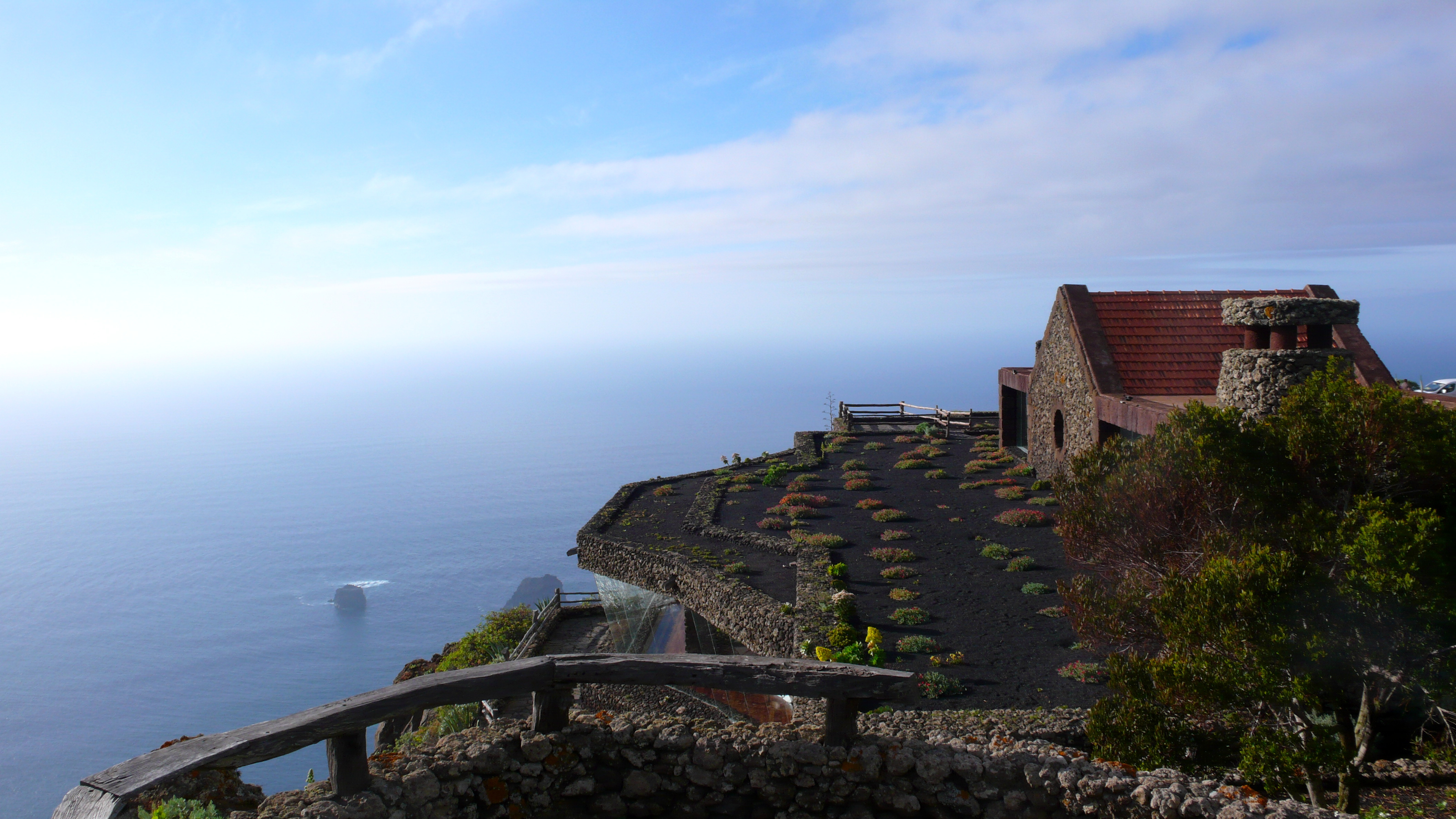
Mirador de la Peña, El Hierro

Like all of the Canary Islands, El Hierro is a tourist destination. It is served by a small airport—El Hierro Airport at Valverde—and a ferry terminal at Puerto de la Estaca, both of which connect to Tenerife. Though El Hierro has a Parador, hotel accommodations are generally in small family enterprises; as a UNESCO World Biosphere Reserve, El Hierro has limited construction to less than half of its total surface and buildings to two floors, maintaining its traditional look and social structure more than the other six major Canary Islands.

== Political organization ==
The island is part of the province of Santa Cruz de Tenerife, and includes three municipalities:

Name	Area (km^{2})	Census Population			Estimated Population (2023)
Name	Area (km^{2})	2001	2011	2021	Estimated Population (2023)
Frontera	84.20	4,455	3,984	4,278	4,483
El Pinar	80.66	0	1,750	1,936	2,027
Valverde	103.65	4,227	4,992	5,076	5,149
Totals	268.51	8,682	10,736	11,290	11,659

Valverde is situated in the northeast and Frontera in the west, both contain several villages.

The seat of the island government (cabildo insular) is in the town of Valverde, which houses approximately half of the island's population.

== Migration ==
El Hierro and the Canaries have become bases for migration out of Africa. In early October 2023 boats carrying well over one thousand migrants had arrived within a few days many of them on "Spanish Lampedusa". "It is believed that the increase in arrivals in the Canary Islands is linked to the political and social crisis in Senegal."

On 14 November 2026, a single-day record of 1,580 migrants arrived in the Canary Islands aboard 15 boats, mostly landing on El Hierro. Most of the arrivals came from West African countries.

== The "Meridian Island" ==
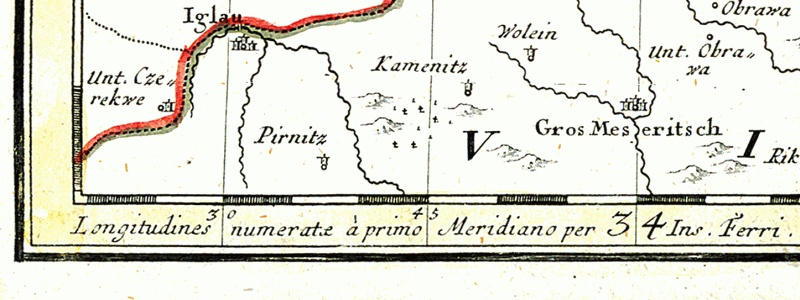
Part of map of Upper Silesia (1746) with Latin message: Longitudines numeratæ à primo Meridiano per Ins[ula] Ferri ("Longitudes numbered from the prime meridian at Ferro Island.").

El Hierro was used in various parts of Europe for more than 500 years as the prime meridian, especially outside of the future British Empire. By the 2nd century CE, Ptolemy already considered a definition of the zero meridian based on the westernmost piece of land in the (known) world, giving a few maps with only positive, eastern longitudes.

In 1634, in France, as ruled by Louis XIII and his minister Richelieu, it was decided that Ferro's meridian should be used as a key reference of maps, in consideration of the island's historic meridian and status as the westernmost-known land of peoples of the 'Known World'. Flores Island is the westernmost Azore discovered by the Portuguese navigators in the early 15th century—after the First Voyage of Columbus in 1492 scholars and cartographers sometimes grouped them among the new world. The Paris elite considered El Hierro to be exactly 20° west of the Paris meridian (1/18th of its relevant parallel of the globe).

Old international maps (outside of Anglo-North American realms) often have a common grid with Paris degrees at the top and Ferro degrees (offset by 20 from Paris) at the bottom. Louis Feuillée also worked on this problem in 1724.

== Festivals ==
The most important festival of El Hierro is the Bajada de la Virgen de los Reyes, held every four years, on the first Saturday of July (the last occasion was in 2025, and the next will be in 2029). During the festival, the Virgin of the Kings (Virgen de los Reyes, patron saint of the island of El Hierro) is taken from her sanctuary in La Dehesa (in the municipality of La Frontera) and carried to the capital of the island, Valverde, making a tour of 44 kilometres and running through all the towns of El Hierro.

The annual festival of the Virgin is celebrated every September 24.

== Natural symbols ==
The official natural symbols associated with El Hierro are Gallotia simonyi machadoi (El Hierro giant lizard) and Juniperus phoenicea (Sabina).

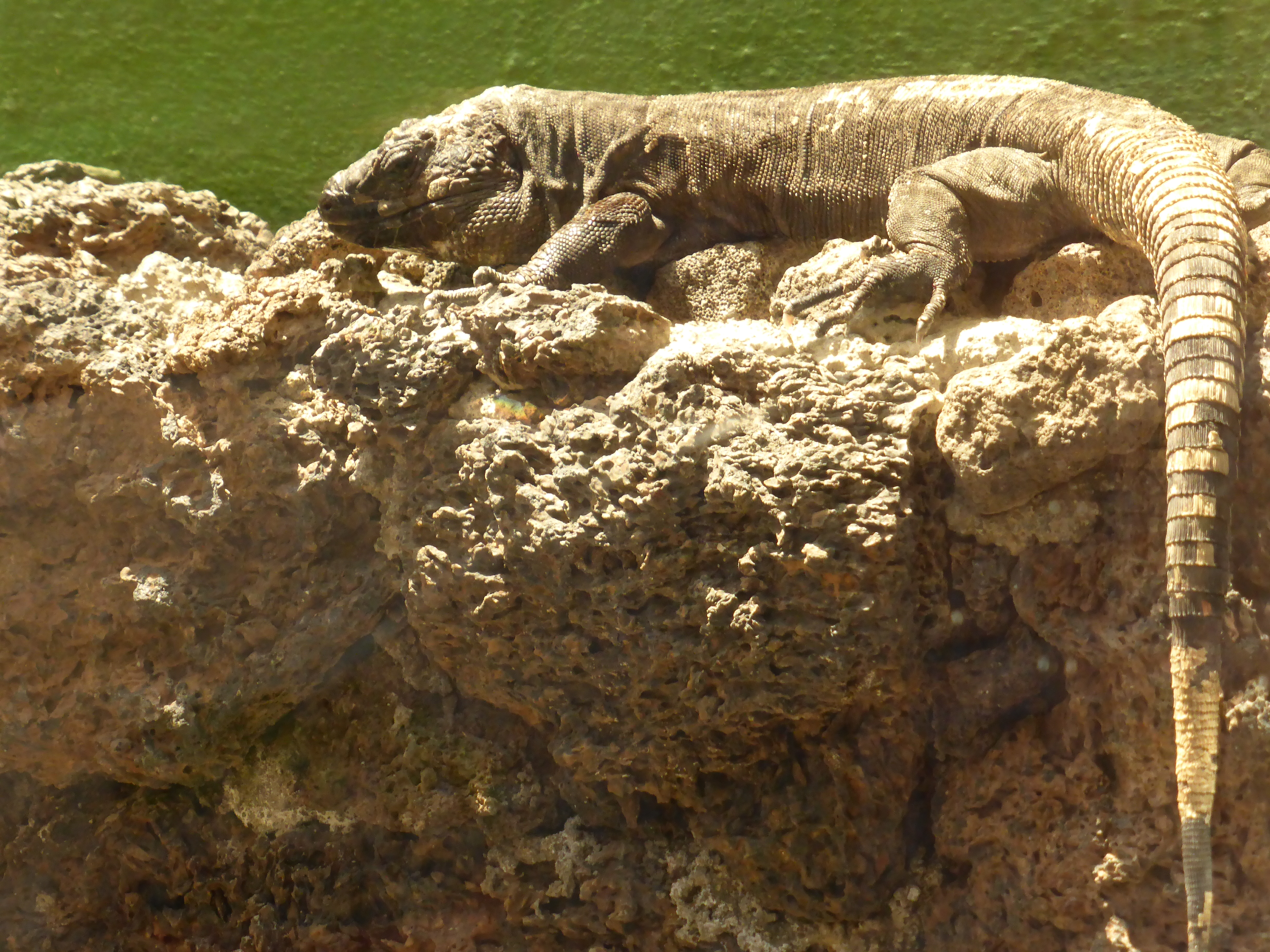
Gallotia simonyi machadoi

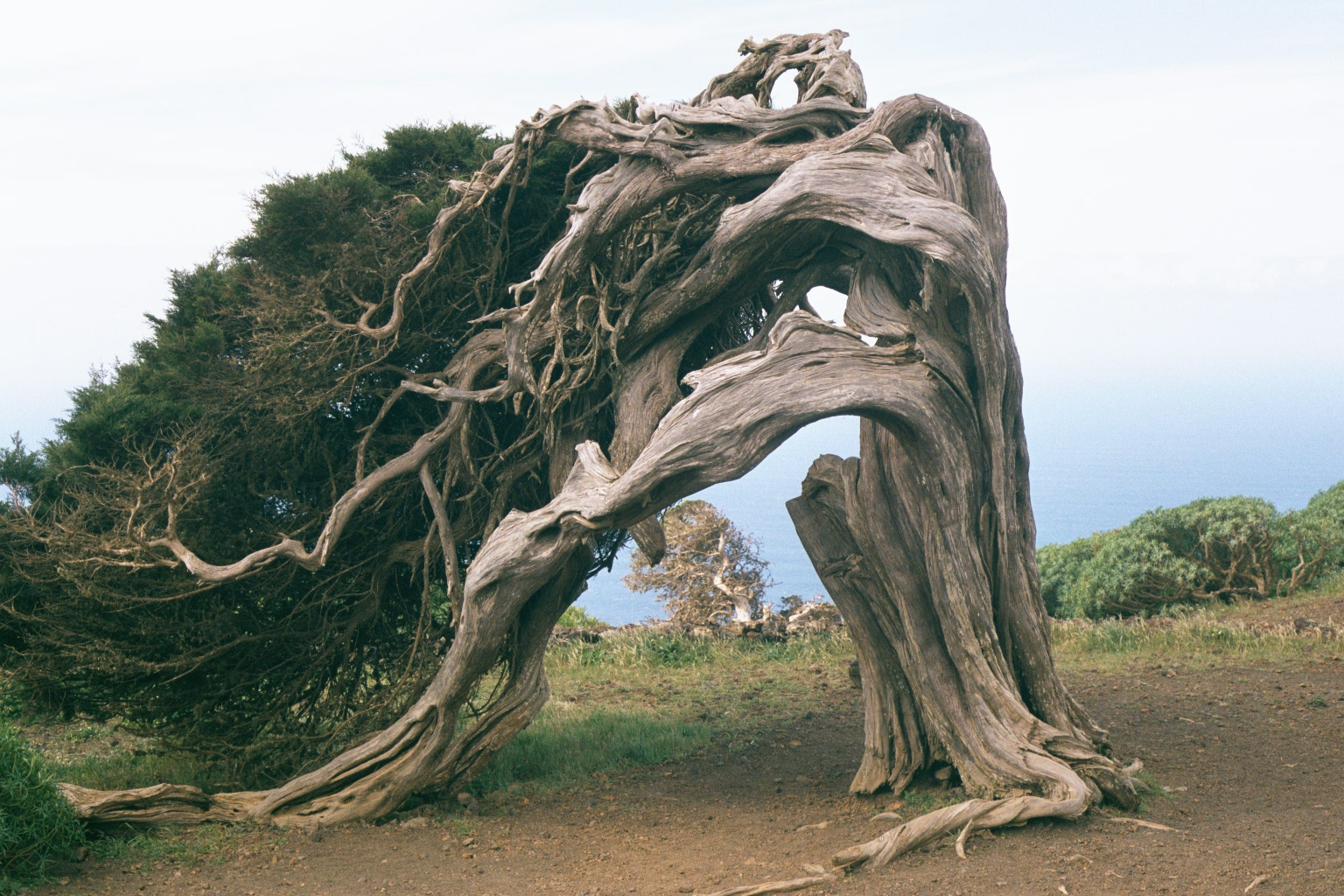
Juniperus phoenicea

== Energy ==
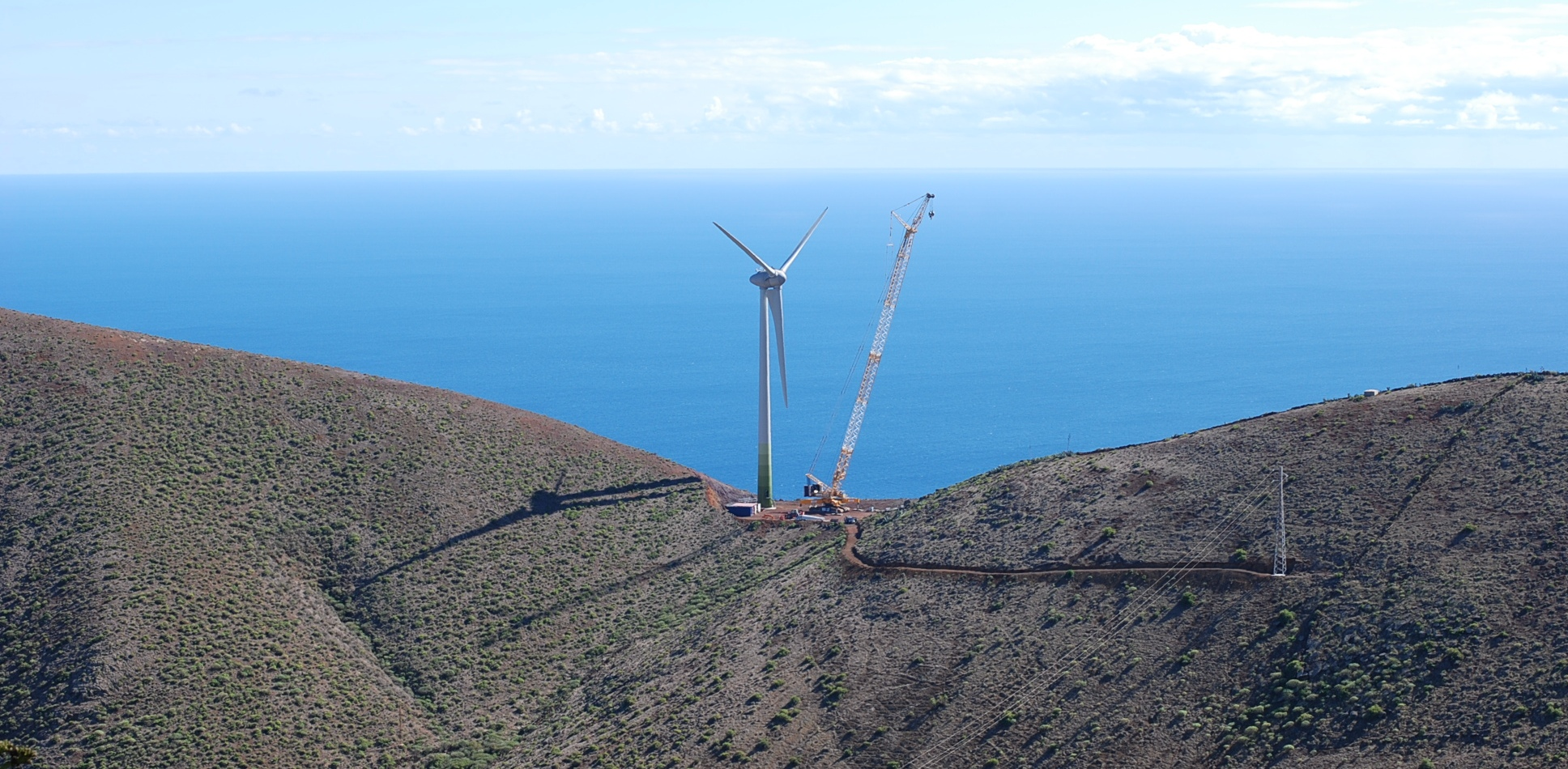
Assembly of the first of five wind turbines with 2.5 MW each

According to the Ministry for Industry, Tourism and Commerce, El Hierro hopes to become the first island in the world to be self-sufficient for electrical energy. This will be achieved through a €54 million project combining a greater than 11-megawatt wind farm and two hydroelectric projects.

This hydro and wind-power project, created by the local Gorona del Viento El Hierro consortium with financial aid from the European Union, and officially inaugurated in 2015, consists of five E-70 wind turbines capable of producing 11.5 megawatts of wind power to supply electricity for approximately 11,000 residents, an additional number of tourists, and three water desalination facilities. The hybrid wind/pumped hydro storage system stores surplus wind power by pumping water up 700 metres (approximately 2,300 feet) to the crater of an extinct volcano. When winds are calm or when demand exceeds supply, water is released from the crater to generate 11.3 MW of electricity, filling a smaller artificial basin created at the bottom of the extinct volcano. Water in the lower basin is then pumped back up again to the upper reservoir when there is excess wind power.

The pumped-storage hydroelectricity works like this: "When wind production exceeds demand, excess energy will pump water from a lower reservoir at the bottom of a volcanic cone to an upper reservoir at the top of the volcano 700 meters above sea level. The lower reservoir stores 150,000 cubic meters of water. The stored water acts as a battery. The maximum storage capacity is 270 MWh. When demand rises and there is not enough wind power, the water will be released to four hydroelectric turbines with a total capacity of 11 MW."

The closed-loop hybrid wind/hydro system is expected to save approximately US$4M per year (calculated with January 2011 oil prices) previously spent on about 40,000 barrels of crude oil imported annually, attempting to make the island completely self-sufficient for electrical energy.

2016 was the first whole year for the power plant and it reached 40.7% of the total demand, reducing consumption of diesel by 6,000 tonnes. In 2017, the share climbed to 46.5%. The installation also powers a desalination plant that provides fresh water.

In early 2018, El Hierro covered its entire electricity demand between 25 January and 12 February with its renewable resource base, avoiding the use of polluting energy sources for more than 560 hours in 2018—and a total of almost 2,000 hours since it started operating.

== Bimbache openART Festival ==
The Bimbache openART Festival and Global Initiative for Arts and Sustainability, founded in 2005 by German-born guitarist Torsten de Winkel and other community activists, is a non-profit effort at creating an interdisciplinary platform which seeks to bridge traditional divides, both on a musical and human level, in a globalizing world. The festival is a contribution of the international artist community to El Hierro's "Sustainable Island" program and collaborates with scientists and sustainability-oriented organizations from around the world.

== El Hierro in literature ==
The island of Hierro is mentioned (1) in Umberto Eco's novel The Island of the Day Before (L'isola del giorno prima, 1994), about a 17th-century Italian nobleman trapped on an island on the International Date Line; (2) in Christopher Isherwood's short story "The Turn Round the World", collected in his Exhumations (1966); and (3) in the first chapter of Steven Callahan's (1986) maritime chronicle "Adrift", in which El Hierro is his final port of departure for an ill-fated Atlantic crossing.

== See also ==
- Geology of the Canary Islands
- List of volcanoes in Spain
- Prime meridian
