= 2011–12 El Hierro eruption =

Submarine volcanic eruption near the Canary Islands

2011–2012 El Hierro eruption
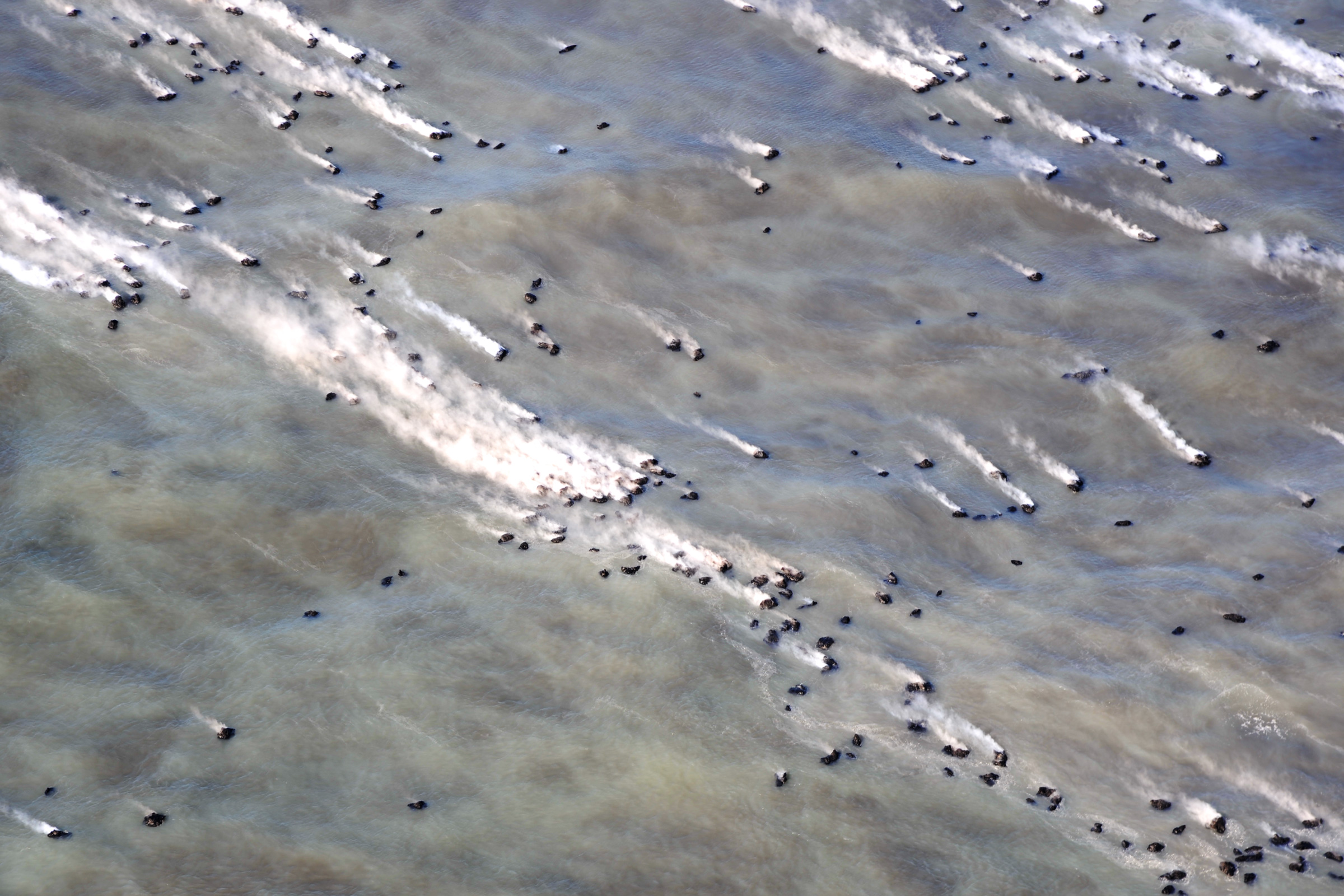
- Lava balloons floating on discoloured water during the 2011–2012 El Hierro eruption
- Volcano: Tagoro
- Start date: 10 October 2011
- End date: 5 March 2012
- Type: Submarine, Surtseyan
- Location: El Hierro, Canary Islands, Spain; 27°36′55″N 18°01′35″W
- VEI: 2

Maps

The 2011–2012 El Hierro eruption occurred just off the island of El Hierro, the second smallest and farthest south and west of the Canary Islands (an autonomous community of Spain), in the Atlantic Ocean off the coast of Africa. The island is also the youngest in the volcanic chain. The October 2011 – March 2012 eruption was underwater, with a fissure of vents located approximately 2 kilometres (1.2 miles) to the south of the fishing village of La Restinga on the southern coast of the island. Increased seismicity in June 2012 to the north-west of the vent did not result in another phase of eruptive activity. Until the 2021 La Palma eruption, which started on 19 September 2021, this was the last volcanic eruption in Spain.

== Earthquakes ==
Beginning on 17 July 2011, increased seismic activity was detected by the Instituto Vulcanológico de Canarias (Volcanological Institute of the Canary Islands) and National Geographic Institute's seismic monitoring station located in Valverde. The seismic monitoring network was increased in density on 21 July to allow better detection and location of the seismic events. There was an earthquake swarm with in excess of 400 minor tremors between 20 July and 24 July; by 27 July a further 320 earthquakes had been recorded. On 25 August there were reports that some horizontal deformation had been detected, but that there was no unusual vertical deformation. At that time, the total number of tremors had exceeded 4000. By the end of September, the tremors had increased in frequency and intensity, with experts fearing landslides affecting the town of La Frontera, and also a small possibility of a volcanic eruption through a new vent. In late September, emergency services evacuated several families in the areas at most risk, and made plans to evacuate the island if necessary.

== Submarine eruption: October 2011 – March 2012 ==
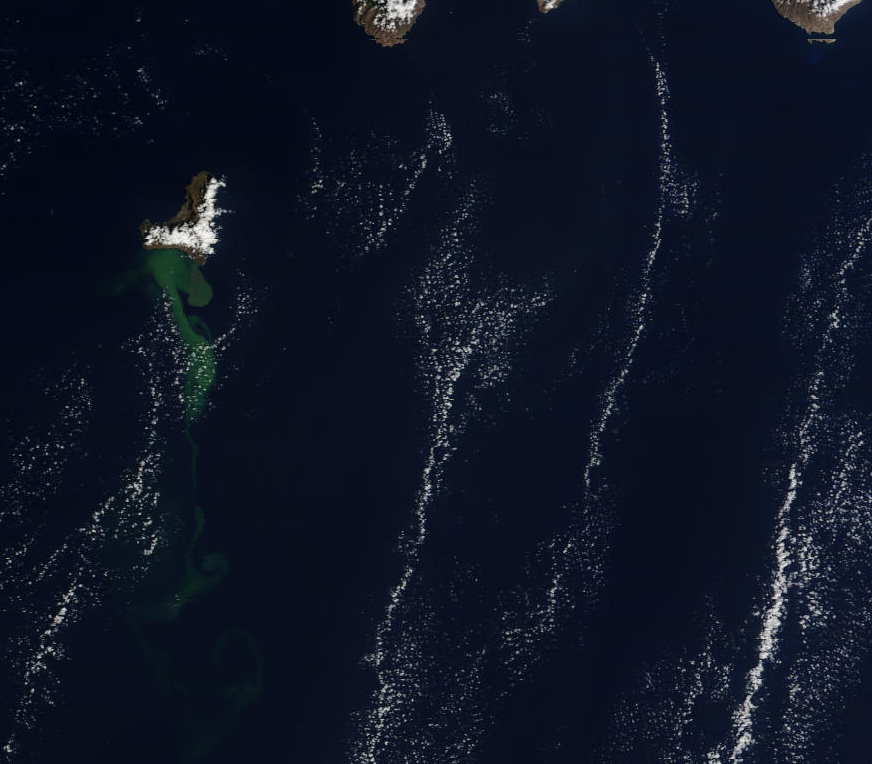
Satellite image taken on 23 October 2011, showing the volcanic material in the sea

Between 4:15 and 4:20 am on 10 October 2011 the earthquake swarm changed behaviour and produced a harmonic tremor. Harmonic tremors are produced by magma movements and can indicate that an eruption has begun. That same day, patches of pale-coloured and sulphurous smelling water with dead fish were seen off the coast of La Restinga. A small submarine eruption had begun, 2 km south of La Restinga. Eruption 'jacuzzis', occasionally reaching 10–15 metres (33–49 feet) high above the surface of the water, were seen during the most energetic eruptive episodes.

In early November, the 600 residents of La Restinga were evacuated for the second time. A confirmed surtseyan type of eruption phase started at the fissure on 7 November 2011. On 25 November 2011 the eruption was ongoing with vigorous phreatic bubbles emerging.

Several separate plumes of material, aligned N-S, were visible from the air, showing that the eruption was of a fissure type.

The main volcano on the island, Tanganasoga, underwent rapid inflation and increased carbon dioxide gas emissions, which were a cause for concern. On 24 November there were various reports of a sulphurous smell in the El Golfo area of the island.

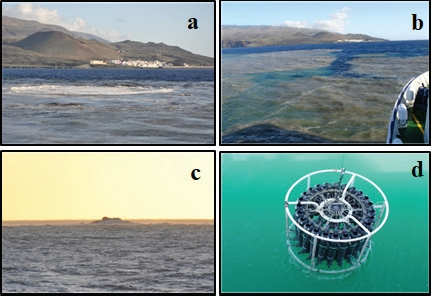
Effects observed in the surface waters as a consequence of the volcanic emissions of Tagoro submarine volcano near El Hierro: (a) Surface seawater bubbling (5 Nov 2011) (b) Colour patches in the surface waters (c) A 10-metre high bubble (5 Nov 2011) (d) Light green seawater surface

On 27 November the coast guard vessel Salvamar Adhara collected some pumice clasts, colloquially nicknamed 'floating lava bombs' or 'lava balloons', some of many that had been ejected by the underwater eruption and floated to the surface of the sea before sinking again.

In the following days, three scientific and seismic survey vessels studied the area: Sarmiento da Gamboa (bathymetry, gravity and mapping seismic profiles), Ramon Margalef (multibeam bathymetric survey, sediment sampling and the acquisition of echograms of the water column) and Cornide de Saavedra (physical and chemical evolution of the volcano stain).

The depth of the volcano beneath the surface of the water was estimated at 60 metres (200 feet) in early December; after detailed bathymetric surveys, the highest point was placed at between 150 and 180 metres (490 and 590 feet) below the sea surface. By late February 2012 the depth of the highest point was 100 metres (330 feet) below sea level.

On 21 December 2011 it was suggested that the eruption was subsiding, as the harmonic tremors and earthquakes are decreasing in frequency; however, in early January 2012 the earthquakes were increasing in frequency and the area of the eruption appeared to be increasing, with a wider area of sea producing the steaming pumice clasts, steam and general "jacuzzi" activity. By late February 2012 a decrease in seismicity, deformation and gas release was noted. In early March the authorities on El Hierro declared the eruption to be over; this was questioned by some vulcanologists. The webcams were taken down. In mid-April 2012 the top of the cone was measured at 86 metres (282 feet) below the surface of the sea. Passive degassing of the underwater vent continued during 2012.

Climatic impacts of the October 2011 to March 2012 El Hierro submarine volcanic eruption were reported by Yim (2013).

== June 2012 activity ==
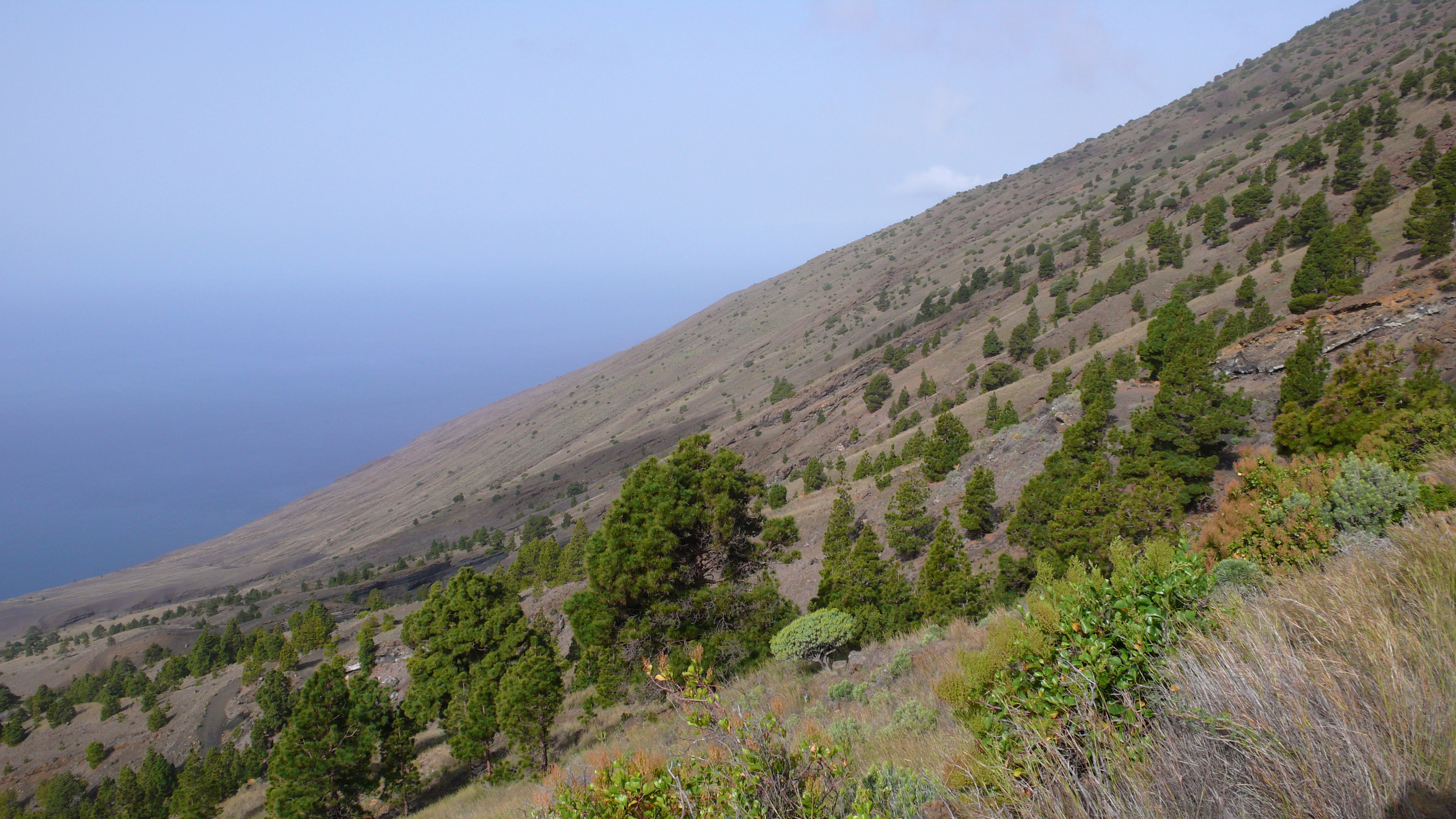
View from the slopes of El Julan on El Hierro. The June 2012 seismic activity was centred near this area.

Between 2 and 4 June 2012 seismic activity on the island again picked up, with small earthquake swarms indicating deep-seated magma movement below the island. A period of quiet followed, with another period of earthquake swarms starting on 14 June. Plotting of the earthquake epicentres showed that the magma was moving southwestwards across the central part of the island and under the area of the sea near the El Julan – La Dehesa area of the island, i.e. to the northwest of the submarine vent of 2011–2012. Deformation of the island continued at a faster rate than that observed prior to the October 2011 eruption. Sensors measured that inflation of 4 centimetres (1.6 inches) height had taken place in the three days up to 27 June - a very fast rate of deformation.

== September 2012 activity ==
In mid-September 2012 earthquake activity increased again.

== Source of the magma ==
For the October 2011–March 2012 eruption, and the two phases of subsequent earthquake activity, plotting has shown that in all cases the magma rose under the area of Tanganasoga. In the eruption it worked south-eastwards to near La Restinga; in the February upsurge in activity followed the same path. Modelling of ground deformation measured with radar interferometry confirmed two shallow magma reservoirs, consistent with the migration of earthquakes epicenters. The June 2012 earthquake activity had the magma moving to the west of the island, and the current (mid-September) earthquake activity has shown that the magma moving south from Tanganasoga.

== Naming of the volcano ==
In 2016, the underwater volcano was officially named Tagoro. The word comes from the Guanche language and means 'circular enclosure made of stones' or 'meeting place'. The name was suggested by the Instituto Español de Oceanografía (Spanish Oceanography Institute) to the Instituto Hidrográfico de la Marina (Navy Hydrography Institute), which is in charge of the naming of such geographical features.

== See also ==
- 2021 Cumbre Vieja volcanic eruption
- 1971 Teneguía eruption
- 1949 Cumbre Vieja eruption
- Geology of the Canary Islands
