= Balloon Fight =

1984 video game

- North American NES box art
- Developers: Nintendo R&D1; HAL Laboratory
- Publisher: Nintendo: JP: Hudson Soft (PC-88, Sharp X1, MZ-1500)
- Producer: Gunpei Yokoi
- Designer: Yoshio Sakamoto
- Programmer: Satoru Iwata
- Artist: Yoshio Sakamoto
- Composer: Hirokazu Tanaka
- Series: Balloon Fight
- Platform: Arcade: NES, PC-8801, X1, MZ-1500, PC-8001mkIISR, MZ-2500, Sharp Zaurus, Nintendo e-Reader, Game Boy Advance
- Release: September 1984: Arcade (VS. Balloon Fight); NA: September 1984; JP: October 3, 1984; EU: 1987 NES; JP: January 22, 1985; NA: September 1986; PAL: March 12, 1987 PC-8801; JP: October 1985 X1; JP: November 1985 MZ-1500; JP: 1985 Zaurus; JP: September 2001 e-Reader; NA: September 16, 2002 Game Boy Advance; JP: May 21, 2004
- Genre: Action
- Modes: Single-player, multiplayer
- Arcade system: Nintendo VS. System, PlayChoice-10

Balloon Fight (Note: Japanese: バルーンファイト, Hepburn: Barūn Faito) is a 1984 action video game developed by Nintendo and HAL Laboratory and published by Nintendo for the Nintendo Entertainment System. It was originally released for arcades as VS. Balloon Fight, with the console version releasing in Japan in 1985 and internationally in 1986.

The gameplay is similar to the 1982 game Joust from Williams Electronics. The home Nintendo Entertainment System version was ported to the NEC PC-8801 in October 1985, the Sharp X1 in November 1985, the Game Boy Advance as Balloon Fight-e for the e-Reader in the United States on September 16, 2002, and as part of the Famicom Mini Series in Japan on May 21, 2004.

A sequel, Balloon Kid, was released in 1990.

== Gameplay ==
The player controls an unnamed Balloon Fighter with two balloons attached to his helmet. Repeatedly pressing the A button or holding down the B button causes the Balloon Fighter to flap his arms and rise into the air. If a balloon is popped, the player's flotation is decreased, making it harder to rise. A life is lost if both balloons are popped by enemy Balloon Fighters, if the player falls in the water, gets eaten by the large piranha near the surface of the water, or is hit by lightning.

There are two modes of play: the 1-player/2-player game where the goal is to clear the screen of enemies, and Balloon Trip where the goal is to avoid obstacles in a side-scrolling stage. The original arcade game does not include Balloon Trip, but all the level layouts are completely different so as to take advantage of vertical scrolling in addition to some minor gameplay differences.

=== 1-player/2-player game ===
In this mode, players have to defeat all of the enemies on screen to clear the stage. This mode can be played alone or co-operatively with a second player. Each player starts with three extra lives. The 3DS Balloon Fight port comes with the Download Play option, that allows player to play along with a friend that has another 3DS system.

Enemy Balloon Fighters float around the screen and the player must hit their balloons to defeat them. The enemy can also fall into the water or be eaten by the fish while flying close to the water's surface. If an enemy is defeated or falls into the water, a bubble will rise up the screen which can be hit for extra points. As play progresses through the stages, the number of enemies and platforms increases.

In every three stages there is a bonus stage, where the goal is to burst all of the balloons that float up the screen from the chimneys at the bottom.

=== Balloon Trip ===
Balloon Trip is a single-player game where the goal is to avoid the lightning sparks and collect the balloons, aiming to move up the ranks and compete for the high score. The player starts with one life.

== Release ==
Similar to other early Nintendo titles, the exact date of the console release is difficult to pinpoint. It was first scheduled for June 1986, was later changed to August, but very likely came out in September.

The home Nintendo Entertainment System version was ported to the PC-8801 in October 1985, the Sharp X1 in November 1985, the Game Boy Advance as Balloon Fight-e for the e-Reader in the United States on September 16, 2002, and as part of the Famicom Mini Series for the Game Boy Advance in Japan on May 21, 2004. It can also be played in the first Animal Crossing, both through its Nintendo Space World 2000 demo and in the final game.

Nintendo released a Game & Watch version of the same name, based on the NES version's Balloon Trip mode. The protagonist is "a Balloon Man". Unlike Balloon Fighters, Balloon Men use rocket suits instead of flapping their hands to elevate while holding balloons.

A sequel to Balloon Fight called Balloon Kid was released in October 1990 in North America and on January 31, 1991, in Europe for the Game Boy, which expands from the game's roots and revamped it into a full platforming adventure. This title was not released in Japan on the Game Boy, but colorized versions titled as Hello Kitty World (published by Character Soft) for the Famicom and Balloon Fight GB for the Game Boy Color were later released only in Japan.

In September 2001, the game was ported to the Sharp Zaurus series of PDAs.

Balloon Fighter and Flipper trophies are obtainable in Super Smash Bros. Melee, and the Flipper is also a usable item, replacing the Bumper from the previous game. The Balloon Fighter was considered for a playable role during the development of Melee, but the Ice Climbers were chosen instead. The original background music for the Balloon Trip in Balloon Fight can be heard in Melee's Icicle Mountain stage as alternate music. The giant fish makes a cameo appearance in Super Smash Bros. Brawl. It appears on the Ice Climber-based stage, the Summit, where it tries to attack the players from the sea. In addition, a remixed version of the main theme, titled "Balloon Trip" is available for the Summit stage as well. Stickers of the Balloon Fighter and the Balloon Fight Enemy can be collected in Brawl. In addition, the Villager from the Animal Crossing series uses the Balloon Fighter's helmet as one of his special moves in Super Smash Bros. for Nintendo 3DS and Wii U. In the 3DS version of the same game, a stage based on Balloon Fight appears with the original 8-bit graphics; the same stage returns in Super Smash Bros. Ultimate and Balloon Fighter appears as a Spirit in said game.

In the WarioWare, Inc. series, some of 9-Volt's games are based on Balloon Fight. In WarioWare: Smooth Moves, there is also a minigame functioning as a three-dimensional version of Balloon Trip; players use the Wii Remote only for the microgame version, and also use the Nunchuk in the complete 3D Balloon Trip.

The original tech demo for Yoshi Touch & Go was called Yoshi's Balloon Trip. Balloon Fight is the theme for Touch Mode in Tetris DS, although the mode itself has almost nothing to do with the game other than the music and decorative graphics.

Tingle's Balloon Fight was released in April 2007 for the Nintendo DS, a version of the game featuring Tingle from The Legend of Zelda series exclusively for Club Nintendo members. The game is a remake of the home version, featuring the "Balloon Fight" and "Balloon Trip" modes. The levels are expanded slightly to utilize both screens, similar to the arcade game except based entirely around the NES levels. A gallery that contained concept art was also included, where each piece could be unlocked by completing specific in-game tasks.

The Balloon Fighter appears in Super Mario Maker as an unlockable Mystery Mushroom costume as part of an update.

Balloon Fight was released on the Wii's Virtual Console in Europe on June 8, 2007, followed by a release in North America on July 16, and Japan on November 12. The game was released on Virtual Console for the Nintendo 3DS as part of that system's Ambassador Program in September 2011. The game was released on the Wii U's Virtual Console service on January 23, 2013, in North America until February 23, as part of a promotion celebrating the 30th anniversary of the release of the original Famicom. Balloon Fight became the first Wii U Virtual Console title to be released. In November 2016, the game was one in 30 games released alongside the NES Classic Edition.

In Nintendo Land, there is an attraction called Balloon Trip Breeze that is similar to Balloon Trip from the original Balloon Fight.

The NES version of Balloon Fight was re-released as one of the launch titles for the Nintendo Classics service on September 18, 2018.

Hamster Corporation released VS. Balloon Fight as part of their Arcade Archives series for the Nintendo Switch on December 27, 2019.

== Reception ==
Reception

Review scores
Publication	Score
Official Nintendo Magazine	74%
Computer Entertainer	3/4
