= Tagoro =

Submarine volcano

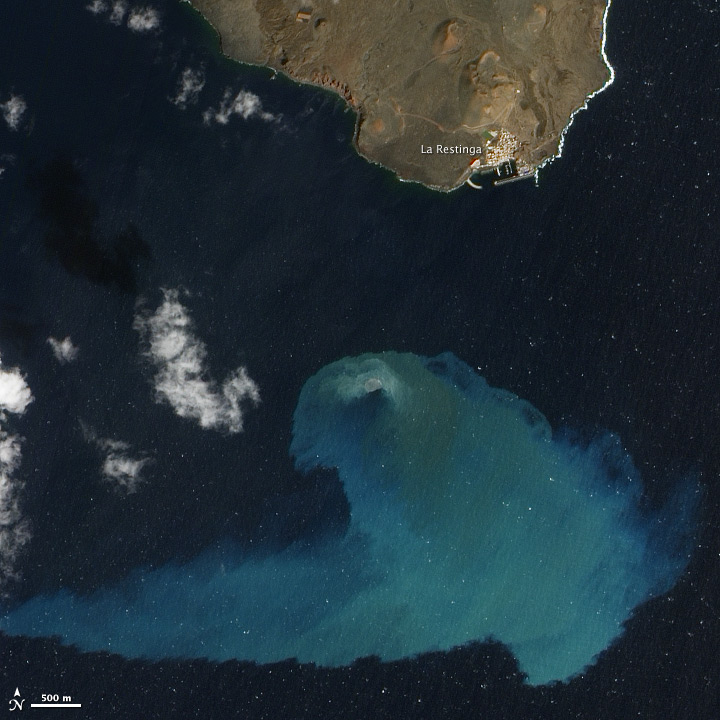

- Location within Province of Santa Cruz de Tenerife Location within Canary Islands Location within Spain, Canary Islands

Location
- Location: North Atlantic
- Group: Canary Islands Seamount Province
- Coordinates: 27°36′55″N 18°01′35″W

Tagoro is a submarine volcano located off the southern coast of the island of El Hierro, in the Atlantic Ocean. It is part of the Canary Islands Seamount Province.

== Eruption ==
The volcano was born upon an eruption that started on 10 October 2011, at a location 1.8 km to the south of the island of El Hierro, more specifically the settlement of La Restinga.

From an initial height of 355 m below sea level, the volcano reached a maximum height of about 88 m below sea level as reported in February 2012. During the eruptive stage the volcano emitted amounts of magma, gases and heat, substantially altering the environment of the maritime area.

== Hydrothermal phase ==
After the eruptive stage, the volcano entered an hydrothermal phase by March 2012. Extensively monitored during the years after the eruption, Tagoro has fertilised the nearby maritime area releasing a large amount of dissolved inorganic nutrients.

Generically known as "submarine volcano of the island of El Hierro" until 2016, the Spanish Instituto Hidrográfico de la Marina (IHM) proceeded then to formally baptise the volcano as Tagoro, following a proposal by the Instituto Español de Oceanografía, Tagoro is an amazigh word roughly meaning 'circular enclosure made of stones' or 'meeting place'.
