= Balloon =

Inflatable flexible bag filled with gas

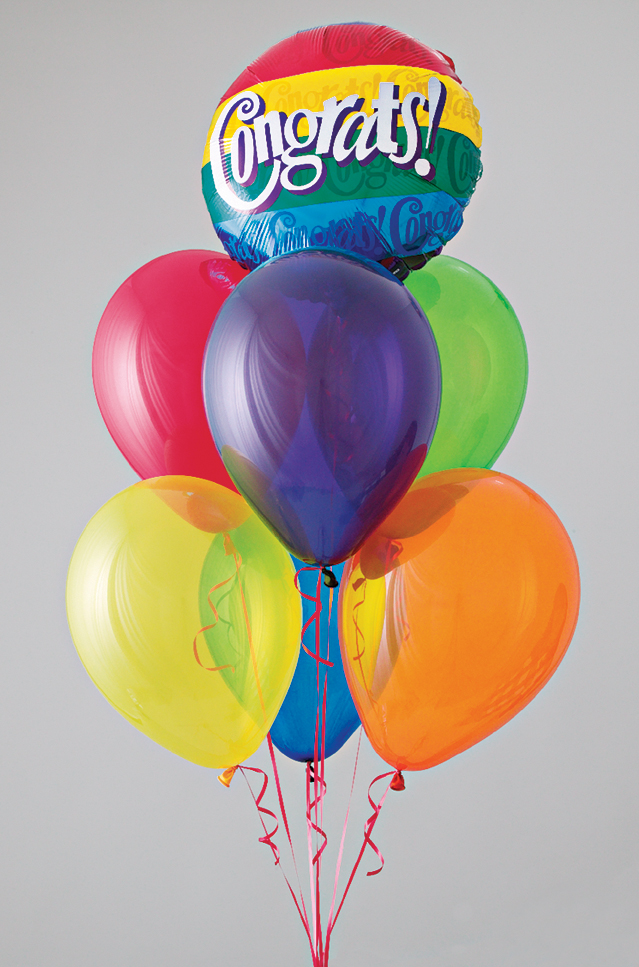
Balloons are given for special occasions, such as birthdays or holidays, and are often used as party décor

A balloon is a flexible membrane bag that can be inflated with a gas, such as helium, hydrogen, nitrous oxide, oxygen, or air. For special purposes, balloons can be filled with smoke, liquid water, granular media (e.g. sand, flour or rice), or light sources. Modern-day balloons are made from materials such as rubber, polychloroprene, or a nylon fabric, and can come in many different colors. Some early balloons were made of dried animal bladders, such as the pig bladder. Some balloons are used for decoration or entertainment, while others have practical purposes such as meteorology, medical treatment, military defense, or transportation. A balloon's properties, including its low density and low cost, have led to a wide range of applications.

The rubber balloon was invented by Michael Faraday in 1824, during experiments with various gases. He invented them for use in the lab.

== Applications ==
=== Decoration ===
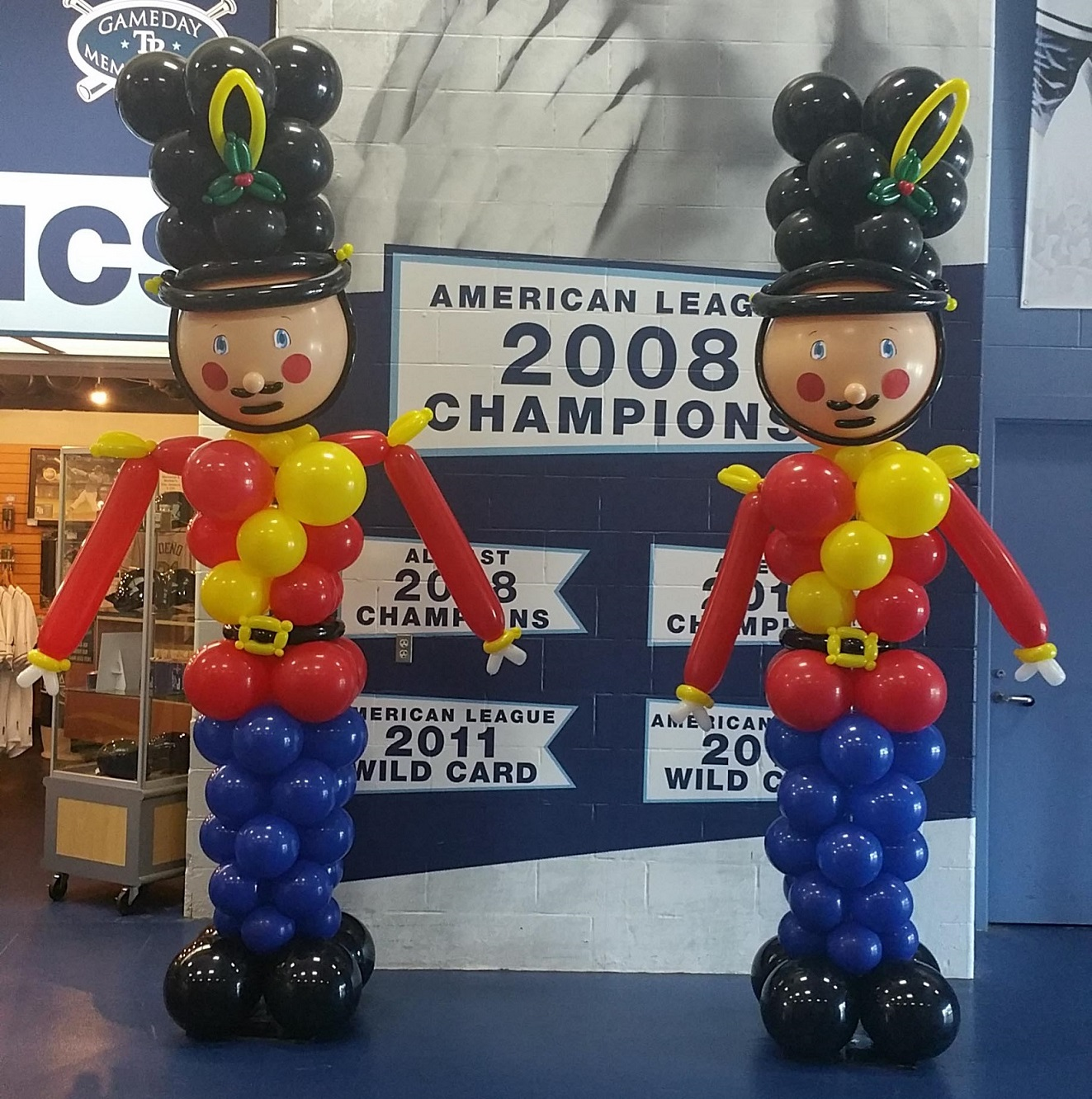
Decorations made of balloons with a combination of stacking and twisting techniques showcasing the deco-twisting style.

Balloons are used for decorating birthday parties, weddings, corporate functions, school events, and for other festive gatherings. The artists who use the round balloons to build are called "stackers" and the artists who use pencil balloons to build are called "twisters." Most commonly associated with helium balloon decor, more recently balloon decorators have been moving towards the creation of air-filled balloon decorations due to the non-renewable natural resource of helium limited in supply. The most common types of balloon decor include arches, columns, centerpieces, balloon drops, sculptures, and balloon bouquets. With the increased aptitude for balloon twisting as well as balloon stacking, the rise of the deco-twister manifests itself as the combination of stacking techniques as well as twisting techniques to create unique and interesting balloon decor options.

=== Party Balloons ===
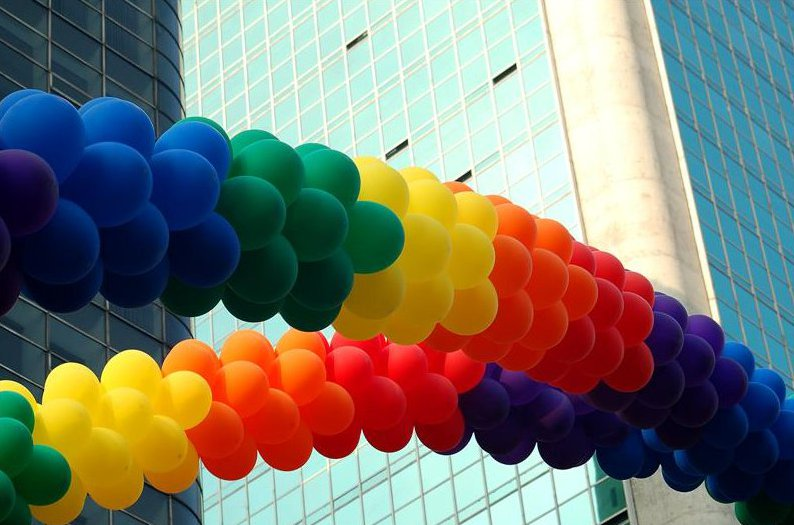
Decorative rainbow colored arches made of party balloons used at the pride parade in São Paulo, Brazil.

Party balloons are mostly made of a natural latex tapped from rubber trees, and can be filled with air, helium, water, or any other suitable liquid or gas. The rubber's elasticity makes the volume adjustable.

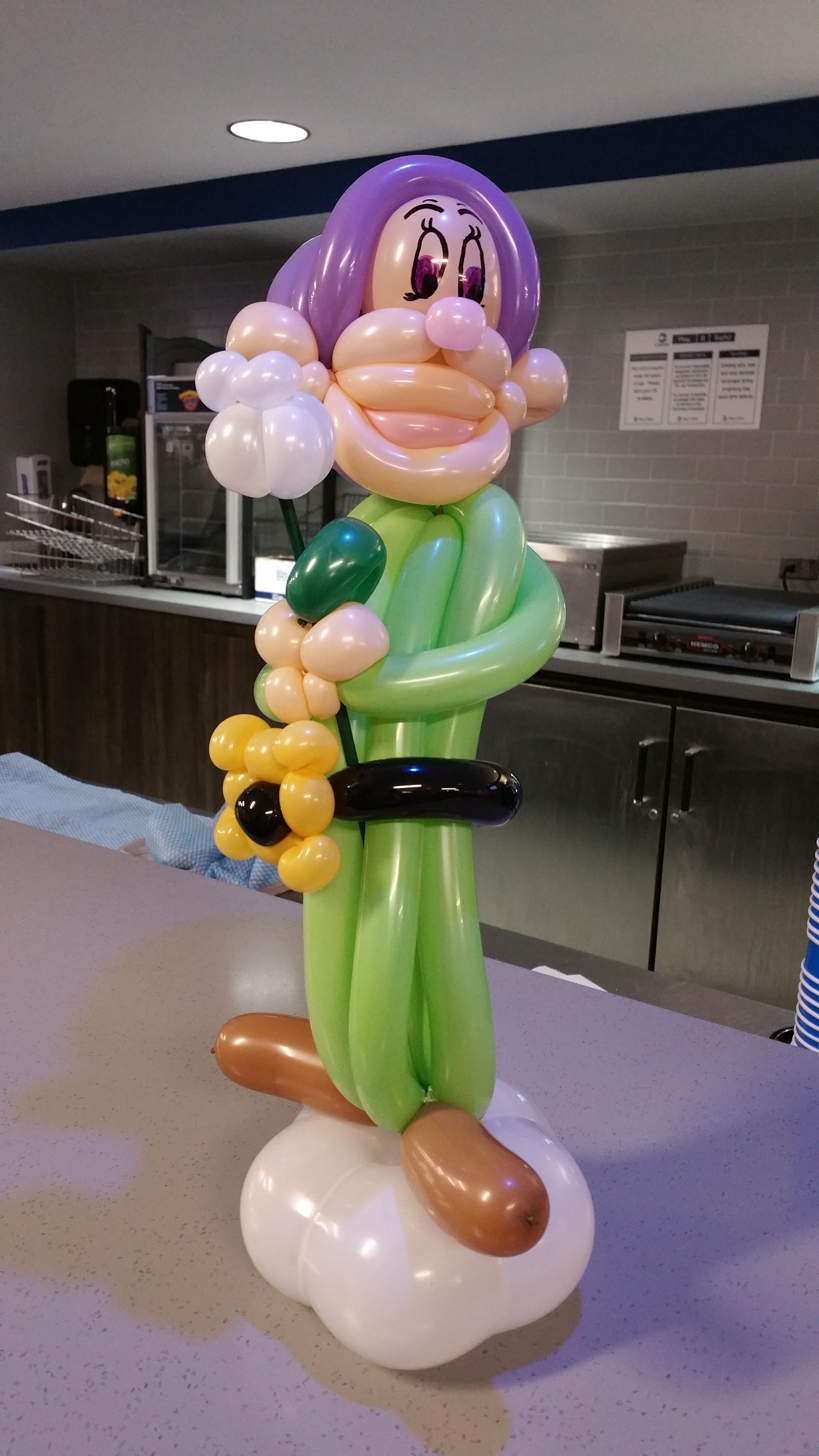
Twisting balloons can be used to create decor centerpieces for events and to create a more unique look than can be provided by foil balloons.

Often the term "party balloon" will refer to a twisting balloon or pencil balloon. These balloons are manipulated to create shapes and figures for parties and events, typically along with entertainment.

Filling the balloon with air can be done with the mouth, a manual or electric inflater (such as a hand pump), or with a source of compressed gas.

When rubber or plastic balloons are filled with helium so that they float, they typically retain their buoyancy for only a day or so, sometimes longer. The enclosed helium atoms escape through small pores in the latex which are larger than the helium atoms. However, some types of balloons are labelled "helium-grade". These balloons are often thicker and have less porosity. Balloons filled with air usually hold their size and shape much longer, sometimes for up to a week.

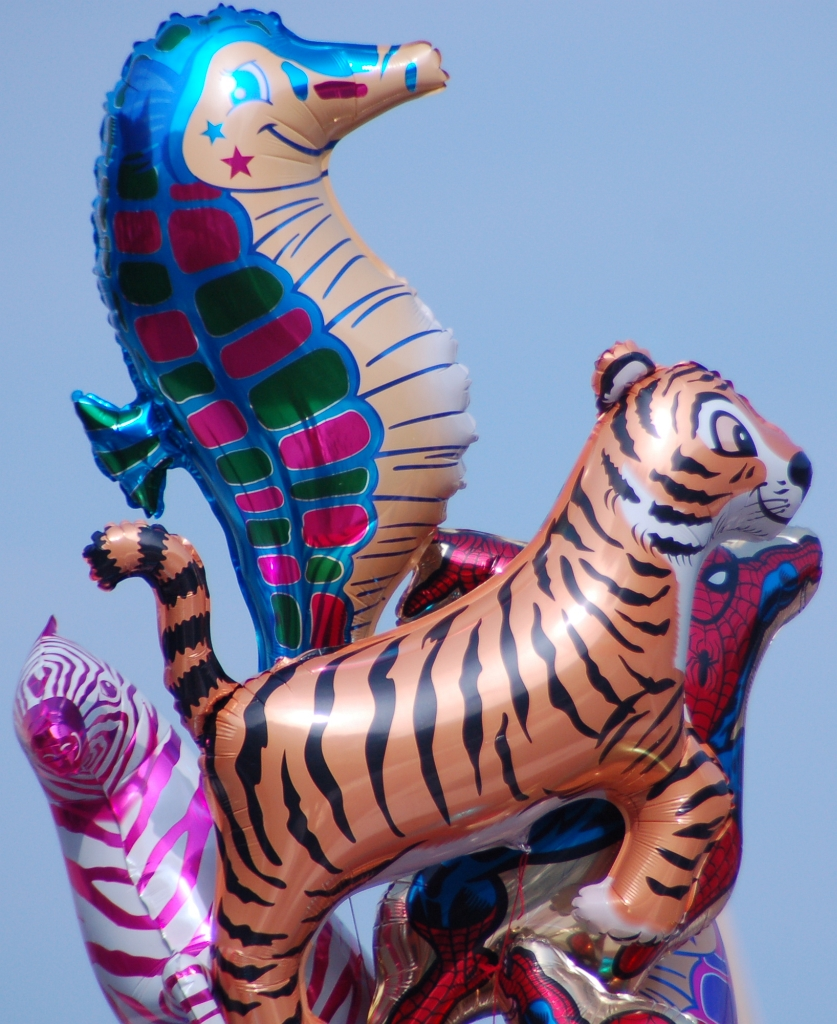
Animal-shaped balloons

However, a rubber balloon eventually loses gas to the outside. The process by which a substance or solute migrates from a region of high concentration, through a barrier or membrane, to a region of lower concentration is called diffusion. The inside of balloons can be treated with a special gel (for instance, the polymer solution sold under the "Hi Float" brand) which coats the inside of the balloon to reduce the helium leakage, thus increasing float time to a week or longer.

Beginning in the late 1970s, some more expensive (and longer-lasting) foil balloons made of thin, unstretchable, less permeable metallised films such as Mylar (BoPET) started being produced. These balloons have attractive shiny reflective surfaces and are often printed with color pictures and patterns for gifts and parties. The most important attributes of metallised nylon for balloons are its light weight, increasing buoyancy, and its ability to keep the helium gas from escaping for several weeks. Foil balloons have been criticized for interfering with power lines.

=== Sculpture ===
Balloon artists are entertainers who twist and tie inflated tubular balloons into sculptures such as animals (see balloon modelling). The balloons used for sculpture are made of extra-stretchy rubber so that they can be twisted and tied without bursting. Since the pressure required to inflate a balloon is inversely proportional to the diameter of the balloon, these tiny tubular balloons are extremely hard to inflate initially. A pump is usually used to inflate these balloons.

Decorators may use helium balloons to create balloon sculptures. Usually the round shape of the balloon restricts these to simple arches or walls, but on occasion more ambitious "sculptures" have been attempted. It is also common to use balloons as table decorations for celebratory events. Balloons can sometimes be modeled to form shapes of animals. Table decorations normally appear with several balloons in each bouquet. Ribbon is curled and added with a weight to keep the balloons from floating away.

=== Drops and releases ===
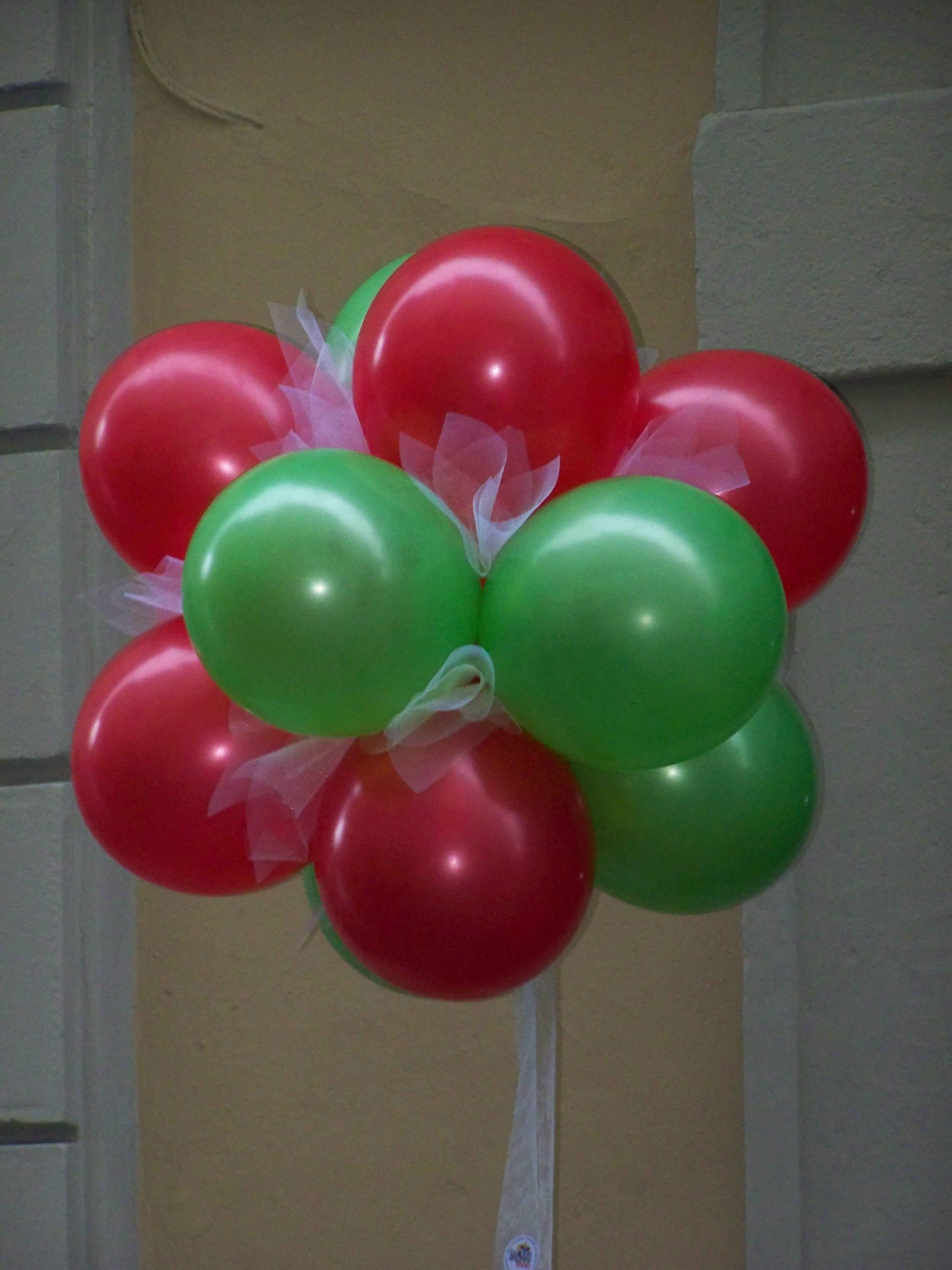
Party balloons in Italy

A decorative use for balloons is in balloon drops. In a balloon drop, a plastic bag or net filled with air-inflated balloons is suspended from a fixed height. Once released, the balloons fall onto their target area below. Balloon drops are commonly performed at New Year's Eve celebrations and at political rallies and conventions, but may also be performed at celebrations, including graduations and weddings. Large ballon drops are a frequent feature at United States presidential nominating conventions.

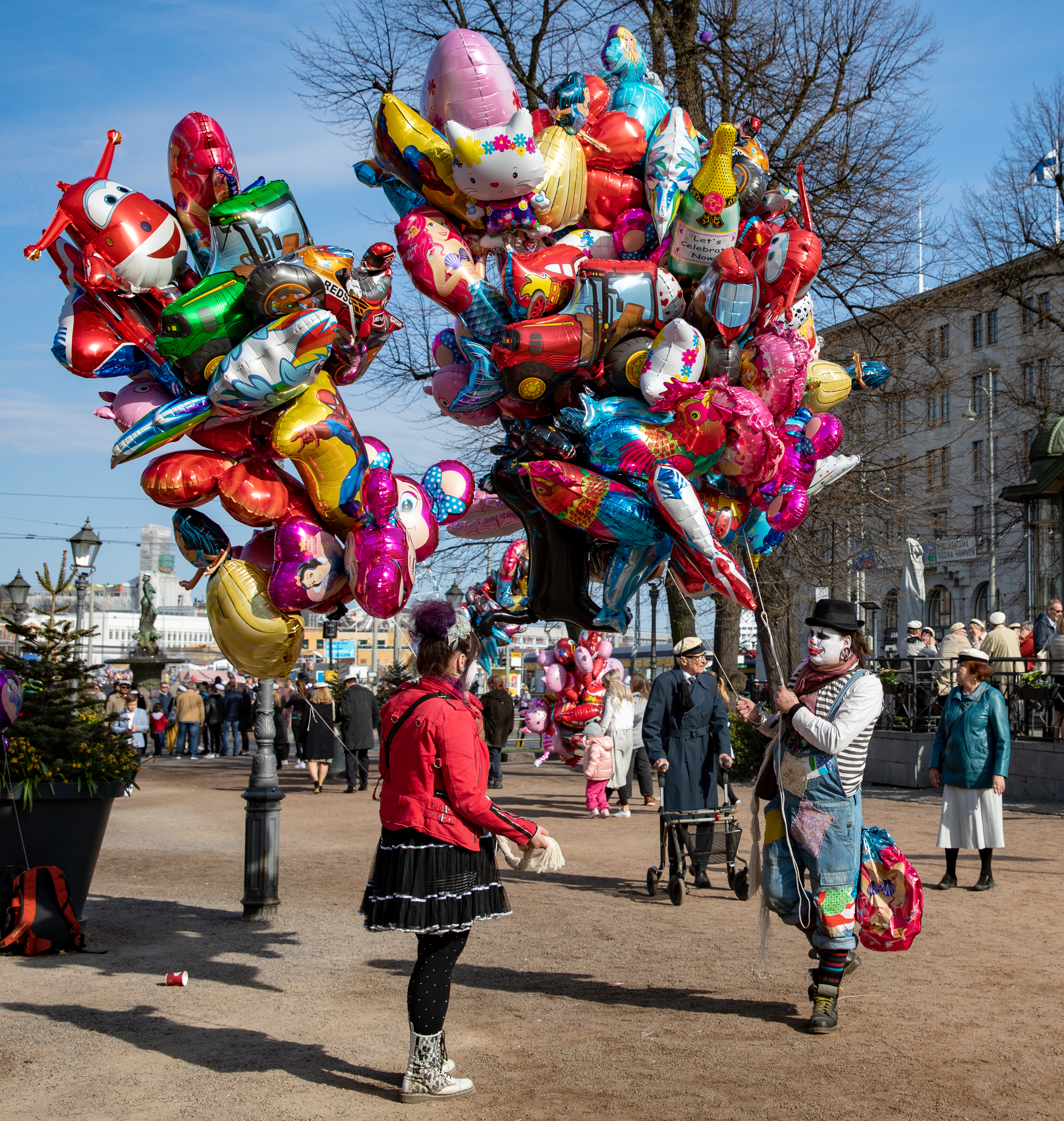
Balloons for sale on vappu in Helsinki, Finland, 2018

For decades, people have also celebrated with balloon releases. This practice has been discouraged by the balloon industry, as it has posed problematic for the environment and cities. In recent years, legislation such as the California Balloon Law has been enacted to enforce consumers and retailers to tether helium-filled foil (BoPET) balloons with a balloon weight. This ensures that the helium-filled balloons do not float into the atmosphere, which is potentially injurious to animals, the environment, and power lines. Many states in the USA have banned balloon releases.

It is becoming more common for balloons to be filled with air instead of helium, as air-filled balloons will not float into the atmosphere or deplete the earth's helium supply. There are numerous party games and school-related activities that can use air-filled balloons as opposed to helium balloons. When age-appropriate, these activities often include the added fun of blowing the balloons up. In many events, the balloons will contain prizes, and party-goers can pop the balloons to retrieve the items inside.

=== Publicity ===
Balloons are used for publicity at major events. Screen printing processes can be used to print designs and company logos onto the balloons. Custom built printers inflate the balloon and apply ink with elastic qualities through a silk screen template. In January 2008, the Jewish Community Relations Council of New York organized a display of 4,200 red balloons outside the United Nations Headquarters.

Also in the 1950s at the start of the Cold War, activists in Western Europe uses balloons for propaganda purposes that would float east over Eastern Europe, which would release newspapers and pamphlets. In 2014, South Korean activists used the same balloon method to get information to those in North Korea.

Paolo Scannavino set the record of 11 for the most giant balloons entered in 2 minutes.

=== Water projection ===
Water balloons are thin, small rubber balloons filled with a liquid, usually water, instead of a gas, and intended to be easily broken. They are usually used by children, who throw them at each other, trying to get each other wet, as a game, competition, or practical joke. By forcing water out the open end of a water balloon, it is possible to use it as a makeshift water gun.

=== Solar lift ===
Solar balloons are thin, large balloons filled with air that is heated by the sun in order to decrease its density to obtain lift.

=== Rockets ===
Balloons are often deliberately released, creating a so-called balloon rocket. Balloon rockets work because the elastic balloons contract on the air within them, and so when the mouth of the balloon is opened, the gas within the balloon is expelled out, and due to Newton's third law of motion, the balloon is propelled forward. This is the same way that a rocket works.

=== Flying machines ===
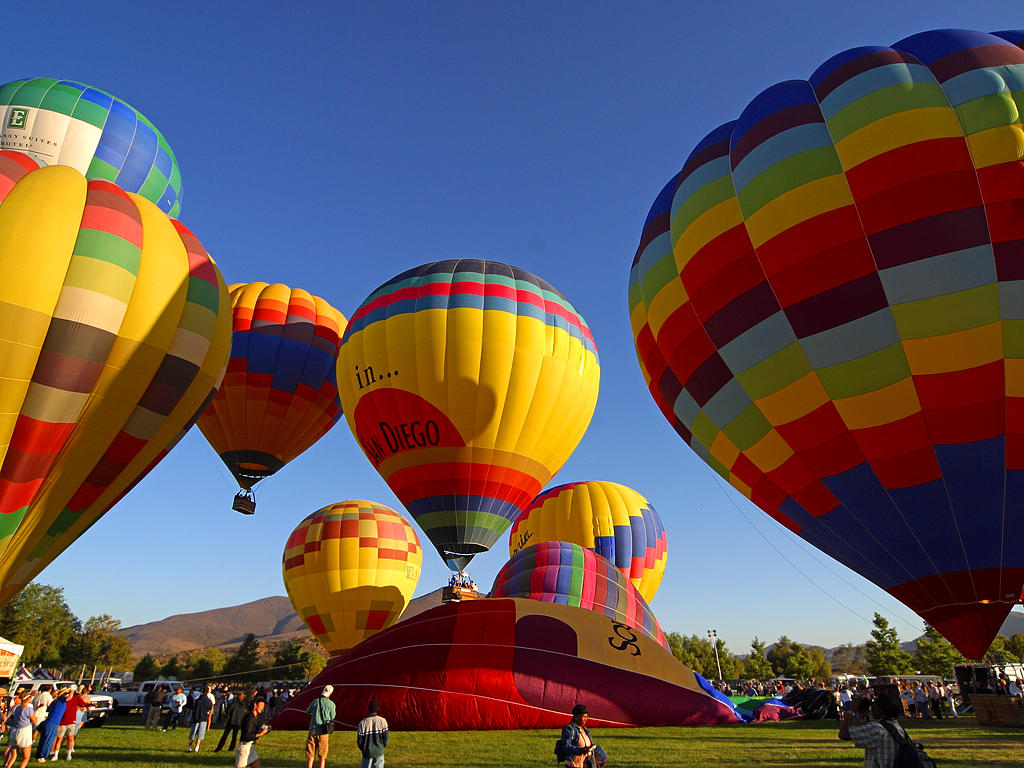
Hot air balloons, San Diego, California

Balloons filled with hot air or a buoyant gas have been used as flying machines since the 18th century. The earliest flights were made with hot air balloons using air heated with a flame, or hydrogen as the lifting gas. Later, coal gas and later still helium were used. An unpowered balloon travels with the wind. A balloon which has an engine to propel it is called a dirigible balloon or airship.

=== Medicine ===
Angioplasty is a surgical procedure in which very small balloons are inserted into blocked or partially blocked blood vessels near the heart. Once in place, the balloon is inflated to clear or compress arterial plaque, and to stretch the walls of the vessel, thus preventing myocardial infarction. A small stent can be inserted at the angioplasty site to keep the vessel open after the balloon's removal.

Balloon catheters are catheters that have balloons at their tip to keep them from slipping out. For example, the balloon of a Foley catheter is inflated when the catheter is inserted into the urinary bladder and secures its position.

Insertion of balloons subsequently filled with air or liquid can be used to stop bleeding in hollow internal organs such as stomach or uterus.

== History ==
Humans have intentionally filled bladders, especially actual animal bladders, with air since prehistory. In Ancient Greece, these had a number of recorded uses. By the 18th century, people were inflating balloons of cloth or canvas with hot air and sending it aloft, the Montgolfier brothers going so far as to experiment with first animals in 1782, and then, when altitude did not kill them, human beings in 1783.

The first hydrogen-filled gas balloon was flown in the 1790s. A century later the first hydrogen-filled weather balloons were launched in France.

The first modern rubber balloons on record were made by Michael Faraday in 1824. He used these to contain gasses he was experimenting with, especially hydrogen. By 1825 similar balloons were being sold by Thomas Hancock, but like Faraday's they came disassembled, as two circles of soft rubber. The user was expected to lay the circles one on top of the other and rub their edges until the soft, gummy rubber stuck, leaving the powdered inner part loose for inflation. Modern, preassembled balloons were being sold in the US by the early 20th century.

== Safety and environmental concerns ==
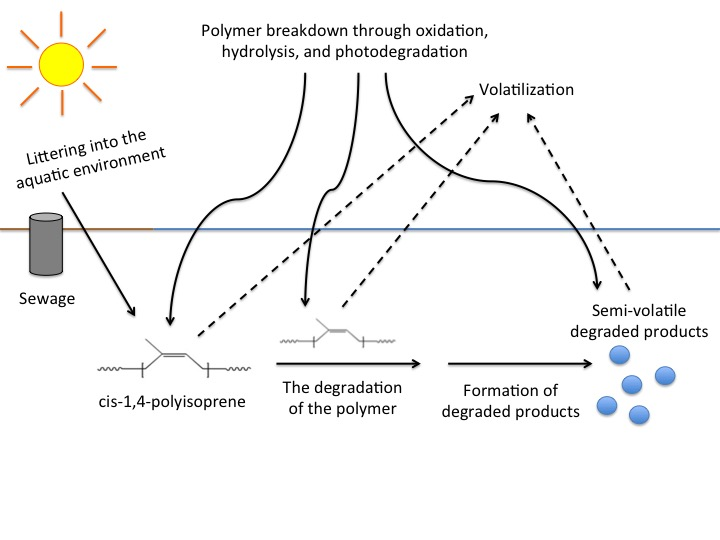
An illustration of the degradation of the latex polymer in aquatic environments

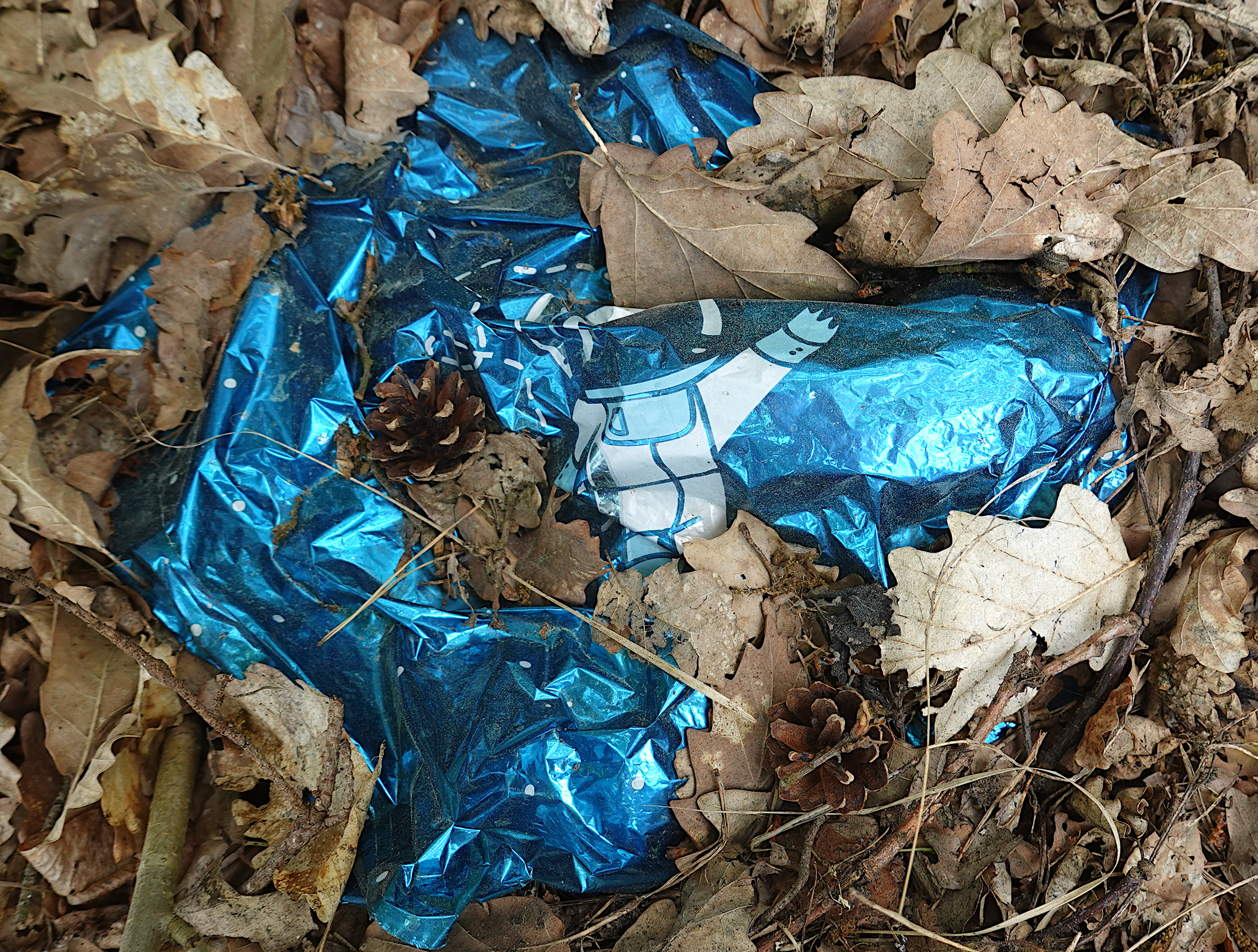
Vacuum metalized PET balloon abandoned in a forest

=== Release ===
There has been some environmental concern over metallised Mylar balloons, as they do not biodegrade or shred as rubber balloons do. Release of these types of balloons into the atmosphere is considered harmful to the environment. This type of balloon can also conduct electricity on its surface and released foil balloons can become entangled in power lines and cause power outages.

Released balloons can land anywhere, including on nature reserves or other areas where they can pose a hazard to animals through ingestion or entanglement. Because of the potential harm to wildlife and the effect of litter on the environment, some jurisdictions even legislate to control mass balloon releases. Legislation proposed in Maryland, US, was named after Inky, a pygmy sperm whale who needed six operations after swallowing debris, the largest piece of which was a Mylar balloon. The Balloon Council, a trade organization that represents the interests of balloon businesses, claims that there is no documentary evidence to suggest that the death of any sea mammal has been attributed to foil balloons as a sole cause, to date. In the United Kingdom, foil balloons sold at major theme parks and zoos have balloon weights attached to help prevent accidental release into the environment.

When balloons eventually return to the ground, they begin the degradation process. Latex balloons are the most used because of their ability to biodegrade. The problem with this is that it can take at least 4 weeks to show substantial degradation of the polymer in the environment, and around 6 months in aquatic environments. This issue can have an effect on the wildlife on both land and in aquatic systems because animals will confuse deflated balloons as food, nesting material, or simply something to play with. When that happens, it can lead to negative effects for the animals. For example, a bird can use a deflated balloon as a component for its nest. When the eggs hatch, they will get tangled in the balloon and that can lead to death.

Anthony Andrady says that releases of latex balloons that descend into the sea pose a serious ingestion and/or entanglement hazard to marine animals because balloons exposed floating in seawater deteriorate much more slowly than those exposed in air. Balloon manufacturers will often state that a latex balloon is perfectly safe to release into the environment as it is made from a natural substance and will biodegrade over time. A latex balloon can take up to a year to degrade if it lands in the sea and during this time it is possible for a marine animal to ingest the balloon and die from slow starvation if its digestive system is blocked.

NABAS (National Association of Balloon Artists and Suppliers), an organisation that styles itself "The Balloon and Party Professionals Association" and represents the UK balloon industry, publishes guidelines for people holding balloon releases. some of the leading balloon manufacturers have started to recommend avoiding balloon releasing, instead preferring to tie balloons down with weights in order to prevent them from floating away. These recommendations have also been adopted by some industry professionals working with balloons in the fields of design and entertainment.

=== Makeup ===
Traditionally balloons are manufactured from plastic. With the rise of worldwide awareness for environmental conservation, some balloon manufacturers started making balloons out of biodegradable materials, which are made entirely of natural recyclable rubber trees. These balloons manufacturing processes preserve the natural state of the material in such a way that allows it to degrade relatively quickly. Some of the manufacturers only use rubber trees that are grown in plantations that receive the Rainforest Alliance's approval, and at which its representatives conduct regular inspections in order to make sure that the farmers meet several criteria set to ascertain that the biological diversity in the area is maintained, and that no worker or natural resource is abused in the material manufacturing process.

Another environmental problem with latex balloons is not the effects the balloons have on the environment once they are decomposed, but when they are being made. When latex is being produced, it produces greenhouse gases, such as CO_{2}, CH_{4}, N_{2}O. This is becoming an increasing problem, especially in Thailand which is responsible for 35% of the world's natural rubber production.

At the start of the 21st century, balloon recycling or reuse for other purposes was in its infancy. As of 2020, several balloon manufacturers have developed methods for effective balloon waste disposal, and some manufacturers use recycled balloons to produce other products, such as toys for pets.

== Air pressure ==
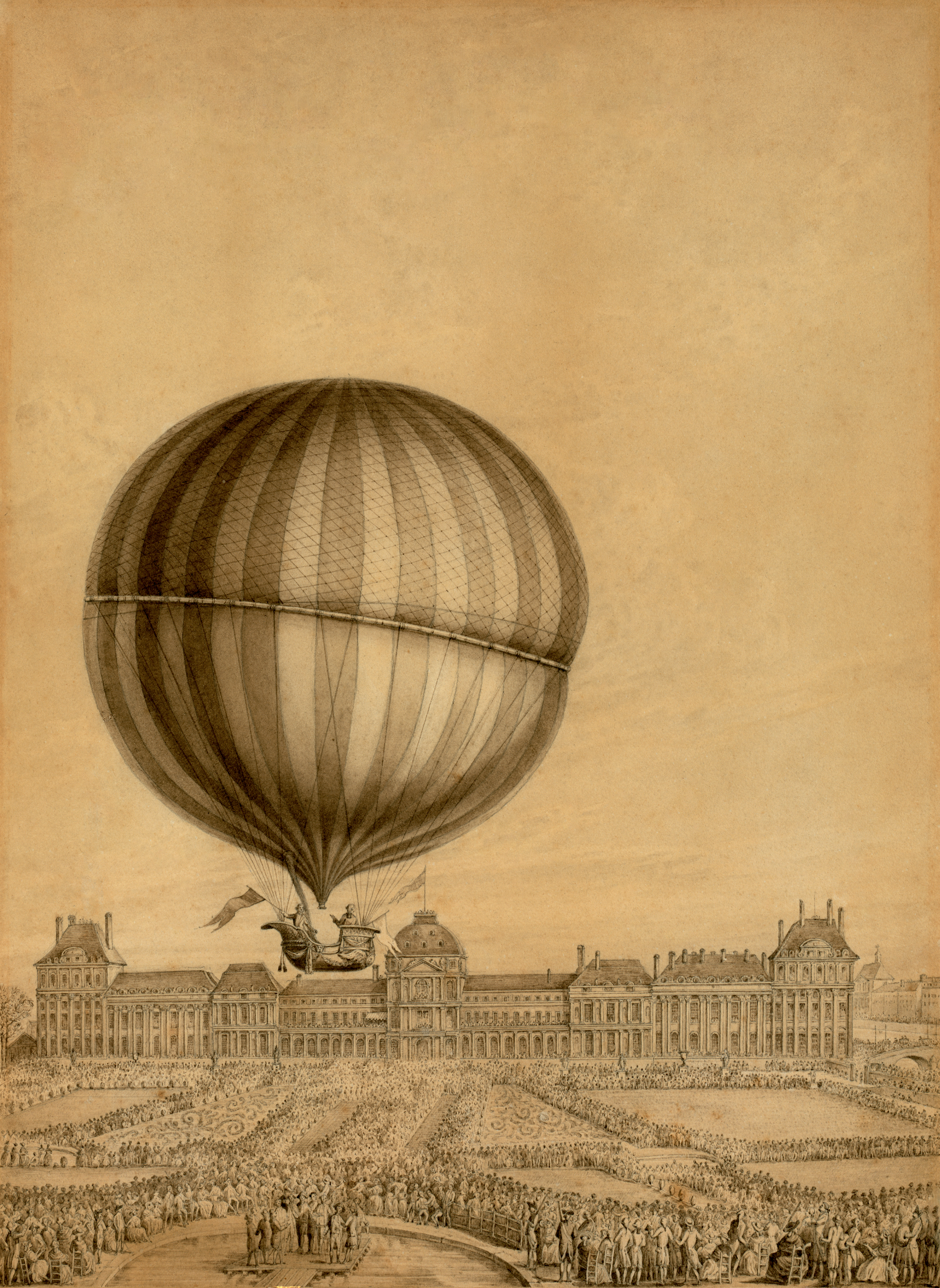
Contemporary illustration of the first flight by Professor Jacques Charles, December 1, 1783

Once inflated with regular, atmospheric air, the air inside the balloon will have a greater air pressure than the original atmospheric air pressure.

Air pressure, technically, is a measurement of the amount of collisions against a surface at any time. In the case of balloon, it is supposed to measure how many particles at any in any given time space collide with the wall of the balloon and bounce off. Since this is nearly impossible to measure, air pressure seems to be more easily described as density. The similarity comes from the idea that when there are more molecules in the same space, more of them will be heading towards a collision course with the wall.

The first concept of air pressure within a balloon that is necessary to know is that air pressures "try" to even out. With all the bouncing against the balloon wall (both interior and exterior) there will be a certain amount of expansion/contraction. As air pressure itself is a description of the total forces against an object, each of these forces, on the outside of the balloon, causes the balloon to contract a tiny bit, while the inside forces cause the balloon to expand. With this knowledge, one would immediately assume that a balloon with high air pressure inside would expand based on the high amount of internal forces, and vice versa. This would make the inside and outside air pressures equal.

Balloons have a certain elasticity to them that needs to be taken into account. The act of stretching a balloon fills it with potential energy. When it is released, the potential energy is converted to kinetic energy and the balloon snaps back into its original position, though perhaps a little stretched out. When a balloon is filled with air, the balloon is being stretched. While the elasticity of the balloon causes tension that would have the balloon collapse, it is also being pushed back out by the constant bouncing of the internal air molecules. The internal air has to exert force not only to counteract the external air to keep the air pressures "even", but it also has to counteract the natural contraction of the balloon. Therefore, it requires more air pressure (or force) than the air outside the balloon wall. Because of this, when helium balloons are left and they float higher, as atmospheric pressure decreases, the air inside it exerts more pressure than outside it so the balloon pops from tension. In some cases, the helium leaks out from pores and the balloon deflates, falling down.

== See also ==
=== Types of balloon ===
- Balloon (aeronautics)
  - Gas balloon
  - High-altitude balloon
  - Hot air balloon
  - Observation balloon
  - Research balloon
  - Solar balloon
- Tethered balloon or moored balloon or captive balloon, a balloon that is restrained by one or more tethers attached to the ground and so cannot float freely
- Tethered helium balloon
  - Weather balloon
- Toy balloon

=== Other ===
- Aerobot
- Balloon-carried light effect
- Flogo
- Lava balloons
- List of inflatable manufactured goods
- Pig Balloon
- Pneumatic bladder
- Radiosonde
- Rockoon
- Speech balloon
- Two-balloon experiment
- Balloon popping
