= Lithophysa =

Felsic volcanic rock

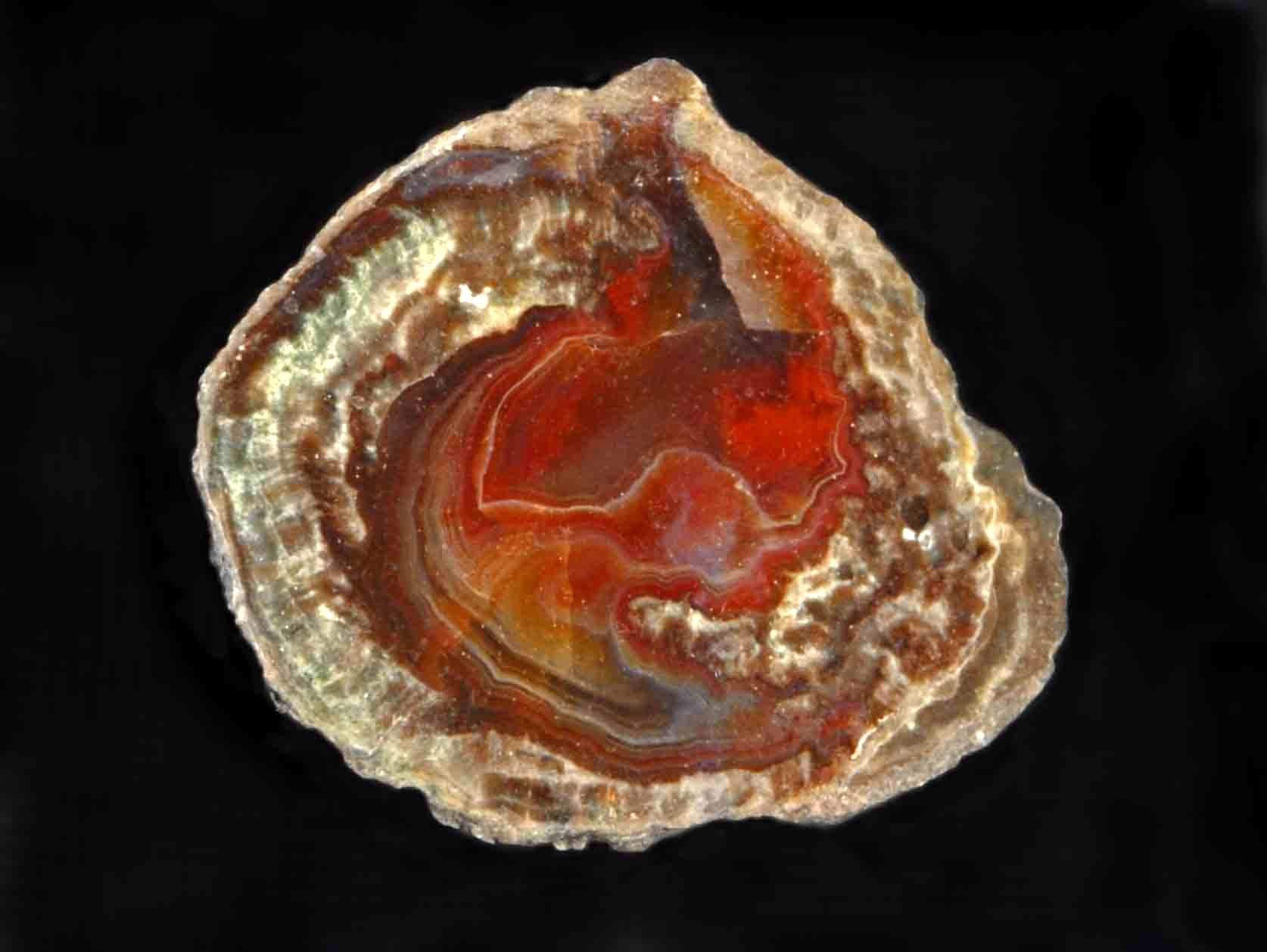
A lithophysa from France

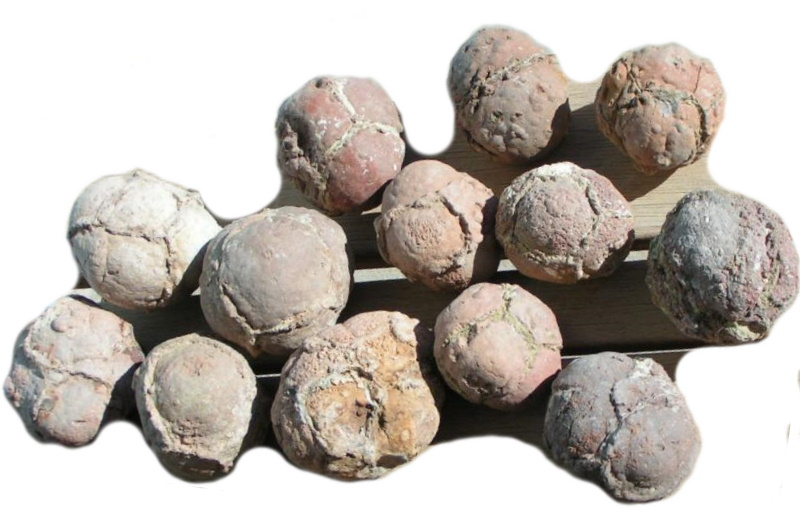
A collection of lithophysae "thundereggs"

A lithophysa (plural lithophysae, from Greek lithos "stone" + phusa "bubble") is a felsic volcanic rock with a spherulitic structure and interior cavity with concentric chambers. Its outer shape is spherical or lenticular. They vary in size from very small up to twelve feet in diameter depending on the age of the magma chamber. These rocks are usually found within obsidian or rhyolite lava flows. Lavas low in feldspar minerals may produce a version known as snowflake obsidian.

These cavities are believed to be caused by expanding gases in tuffs and rhyolitic lavas before solidification. If the cavity becomes lined with crystals it may be referred to as a geode or if filled partially or fully with agate, jasper or opal it is called a thunderegg. The term vug is also used for similar cavities although the meaning of vug is usually restricted to cavities in rocks formed by the removal of material such as soluble minerals. These cavities usually contain layers of various colors (red, pink, gray, etc.) composed by crystals of quartz, chalcedony, hematite, fluorite and various colored oxides or other minerals.

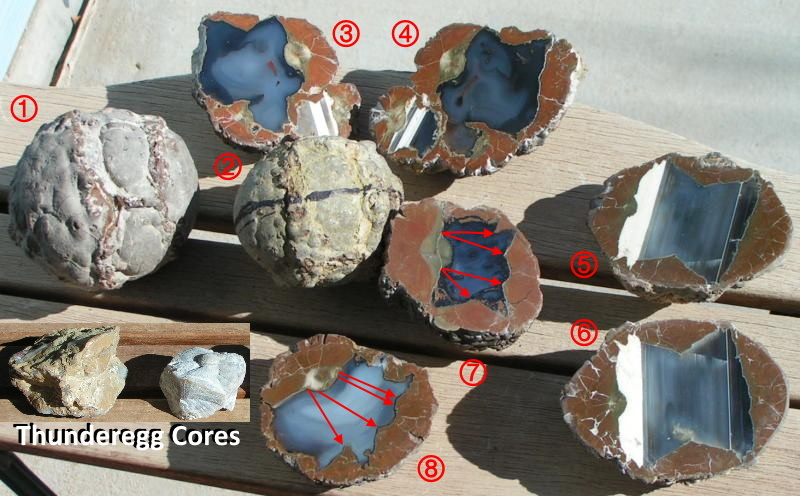
Lithophysae from Richardson Ranch near Madras Oregon. 1, 2. Displaying typical plates and "sutures". 3, 4. A cluster with three spheroid centers. 5, 6. Example of slow fill structure layers with a large opal layer at the bottom. Expansion is controlled by where the water was located in the structure.: 7. "Dimple" and "pimple" where expansion began on an inner shell.; 8. Fortification agate

Lithophysae are one of the many forms of silica (SiO_{2}), as quartz, agate, opal, chalcedony, etc. They can have an average diameter 5–20 centimetres (2.0–7.9 in), but can be much larger (for example, 300–370 centimetres (10–12 ft) at Silver Cliff in Colorado). Lithophysae are also related to the spherulites found in obsidians on the Italian island of Lipari, in Yellowstone National Park, and other places.

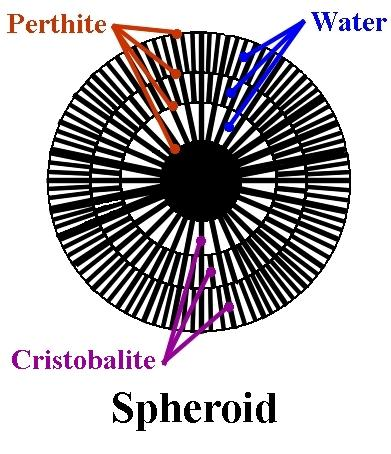
Spheroids form in high silica magmas

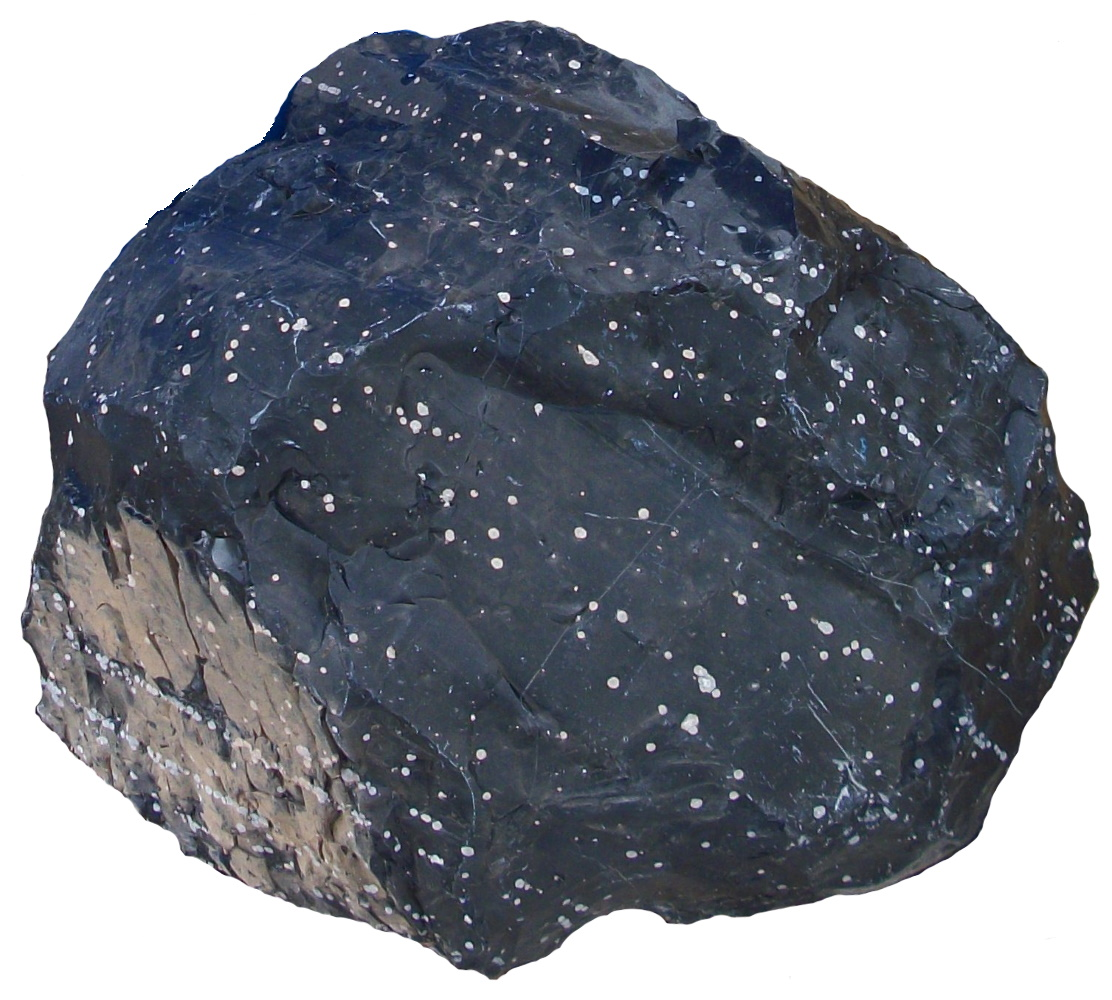
Spheroid "trains" in obsidian

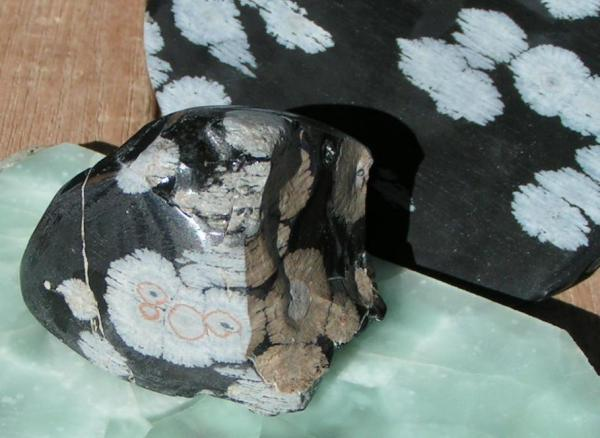
Snowflake obsidian

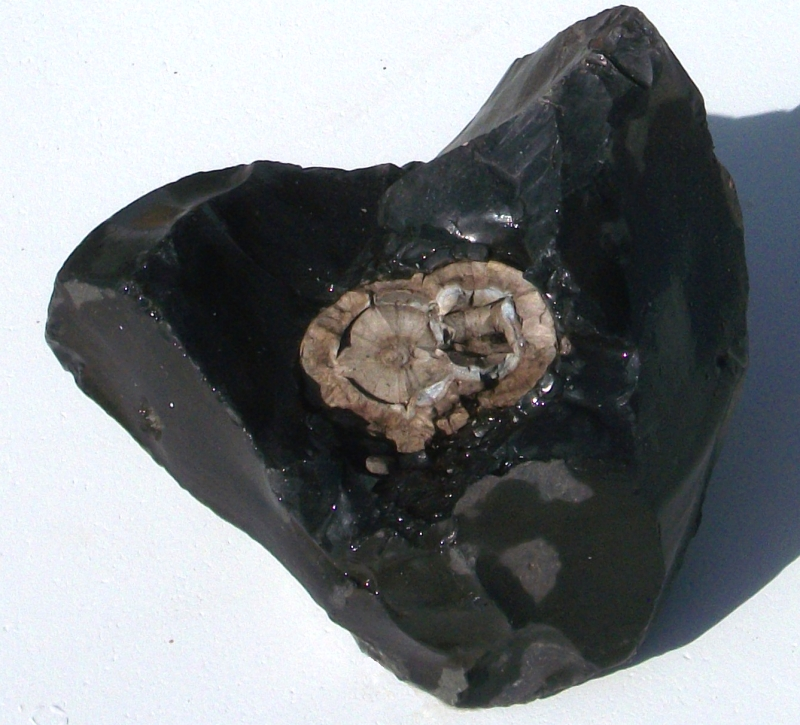
A partially "blown" spheroid pair in obsidian

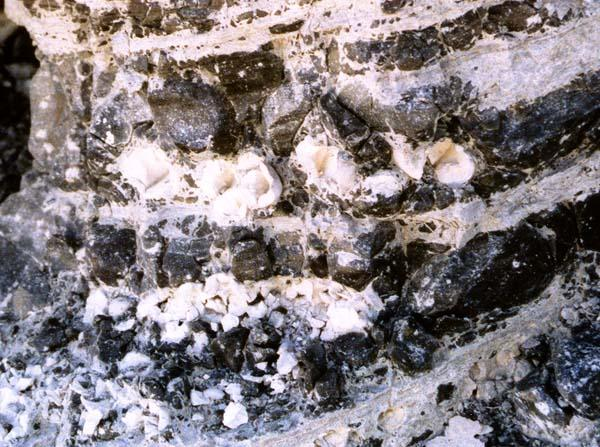
"Trains" of "blown" spheroids transformed to lithophysae

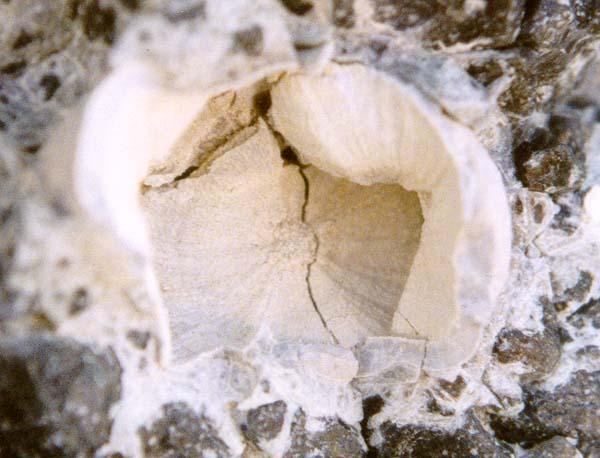
"Blown" spheroid transformed to a lithophysa

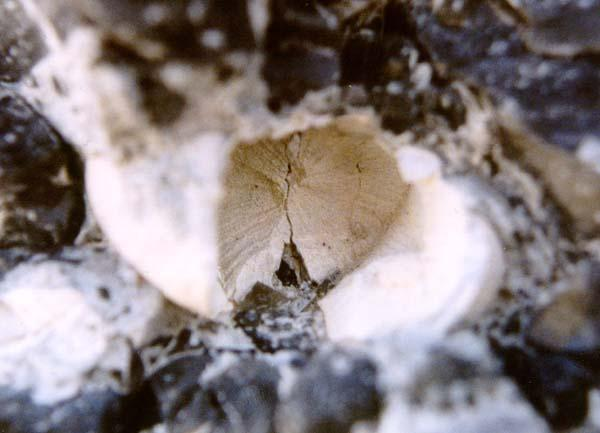
"Blown" spheroid transformed to a lithophysa

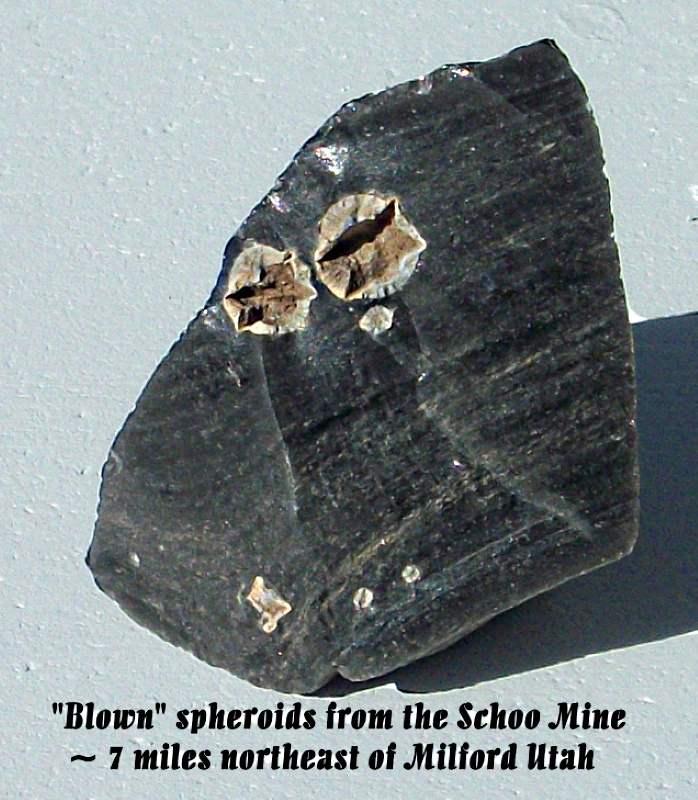
"Blown" spheroids transformed to lithophysae

== See also ==
- Lava balloon
