= Tanganasoga =

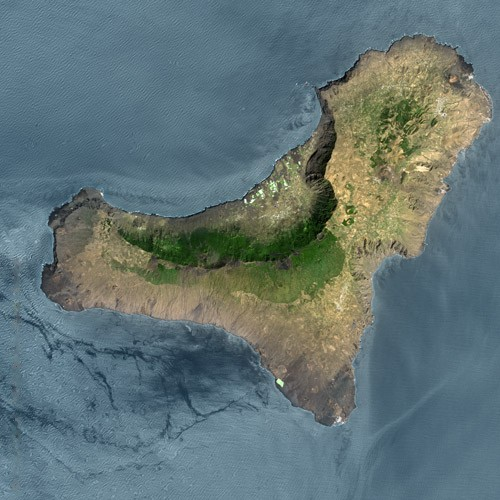
- A large brown ring within the largest green area marks the location of the cinder cone.

Highest point
- Elevation: 1,384 m (4,541 ft)
- Coordinates: 27°43.808′N 18°03.560′W

Geography
- Location: El Hierro, Canary Islands
- Parent range: Canary Islands

Geology
- Mountain type: Cinder cone atop shield volcano

Tanganasoga is the main volcano of El Hierro's El Golfo area in the Canary Islands, consisting of a cinder cone. The volcano is part of a much larger shield volcano system.

== The volcano ==
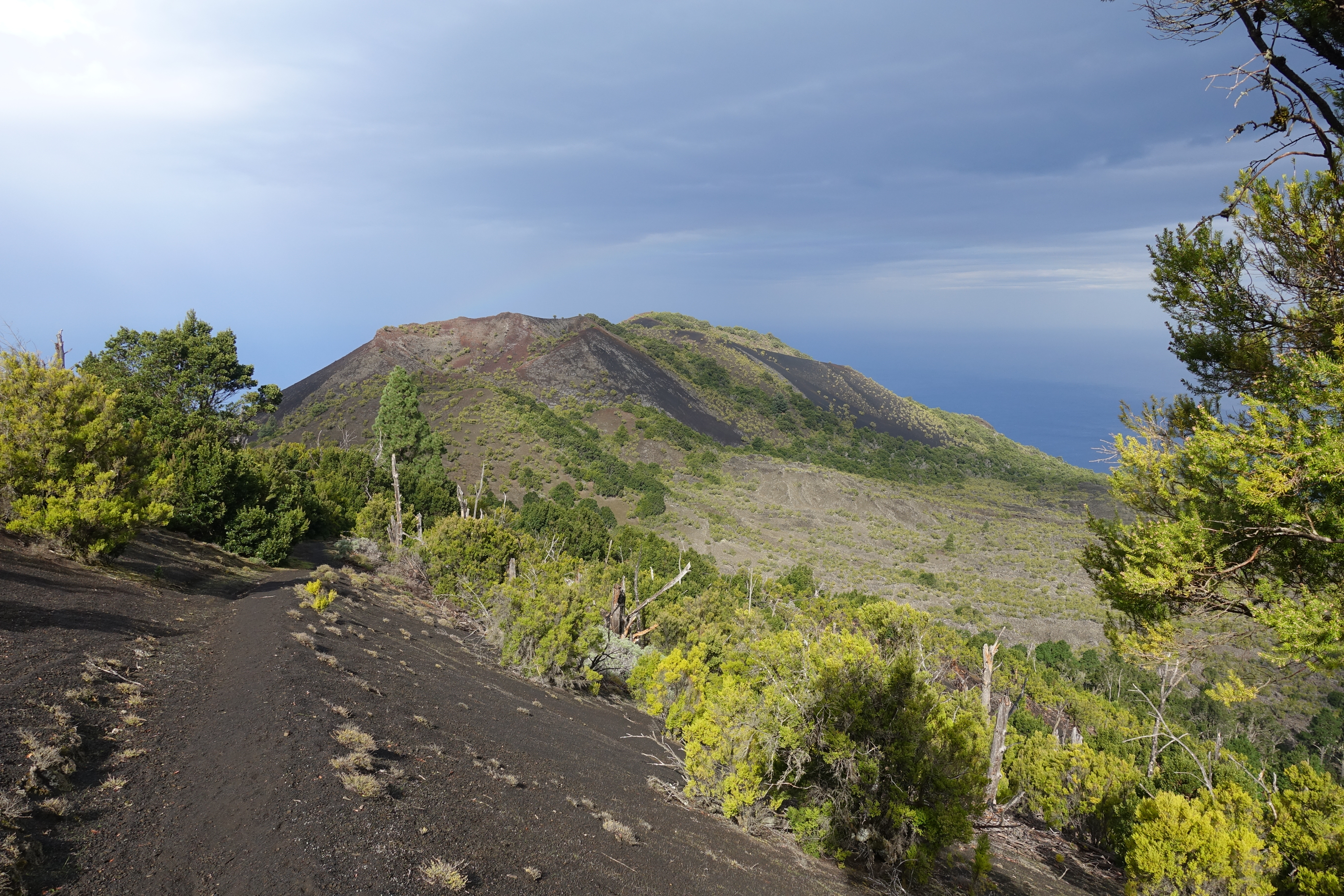
Tanganasoga

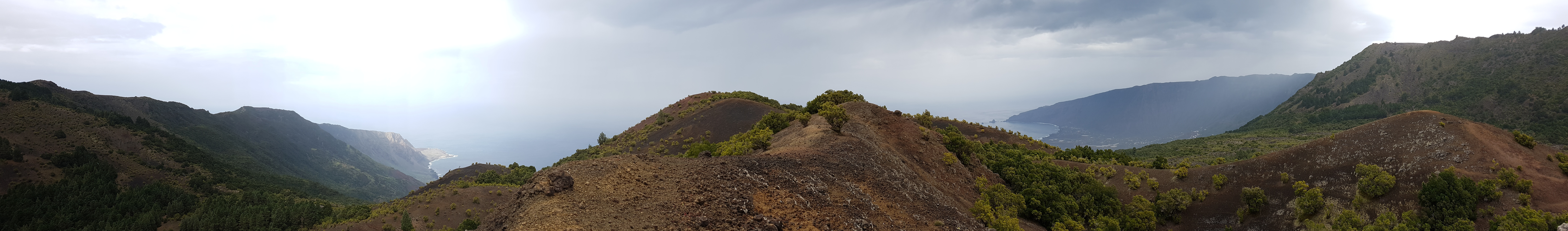
Tanganasoga view from the top

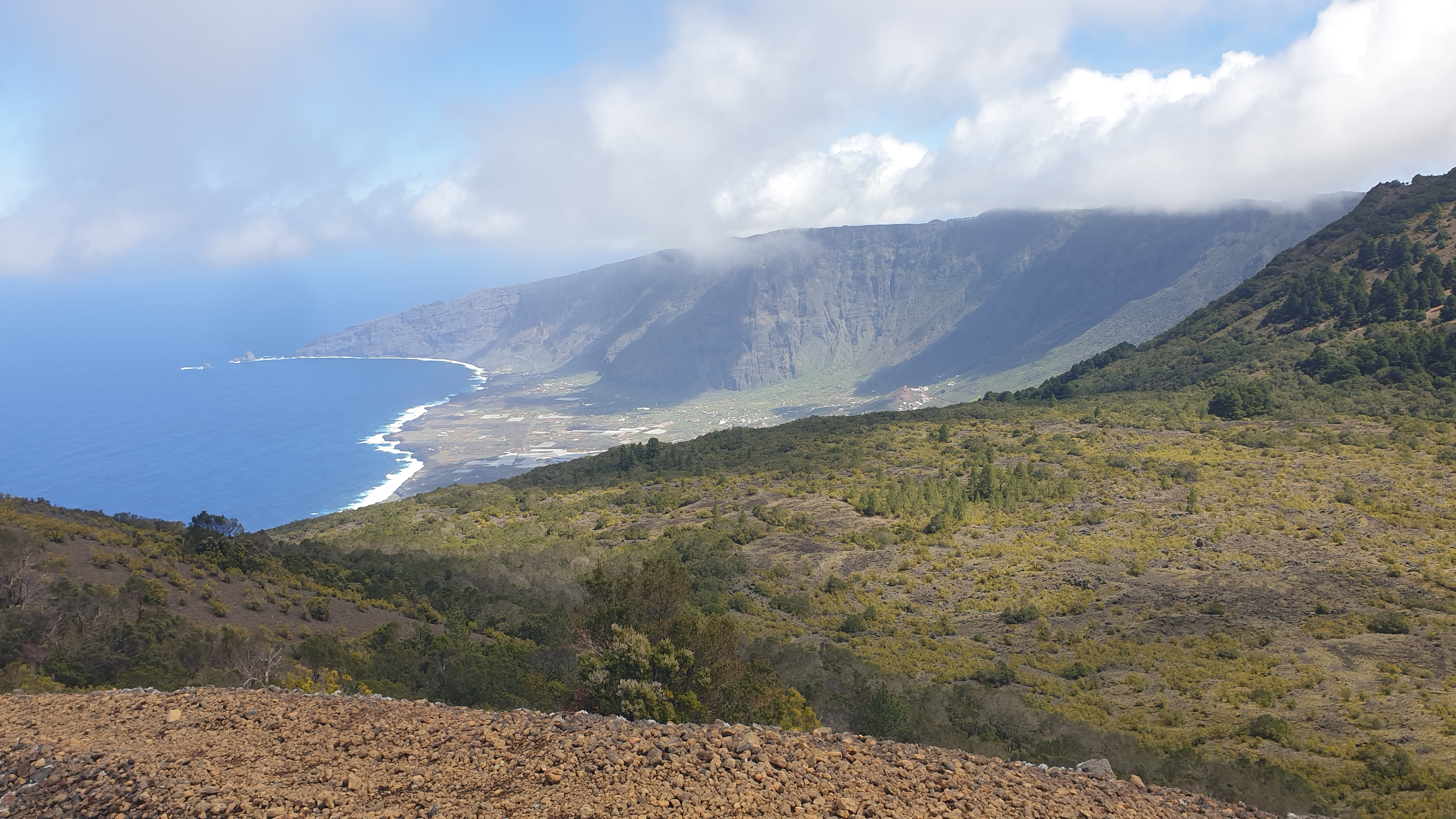
View from Tanganasoga volcano into the Golfo Valley.

El Hierro is a 278.5 km^{2} island, formed approx 1.2 million year ago after three successive eruptions, the island emerged from the ocean as a triangle of basaltic dykes topped with a volcanic cone more than 2,000 metres high. With continued activity resulting in the island expanding to have the largest number of volcanoes in the Canaries (over 500 cones, another 300 covered by more recent deposits), together with approximately 70 caves and volcanic galleries, including the Cueva de Don Justo whose collection of channels is over 6 km in length. Landslides have reduced the size and height of the island. Tanganasoga is now the main volcano on the island.

=== Landslides ===
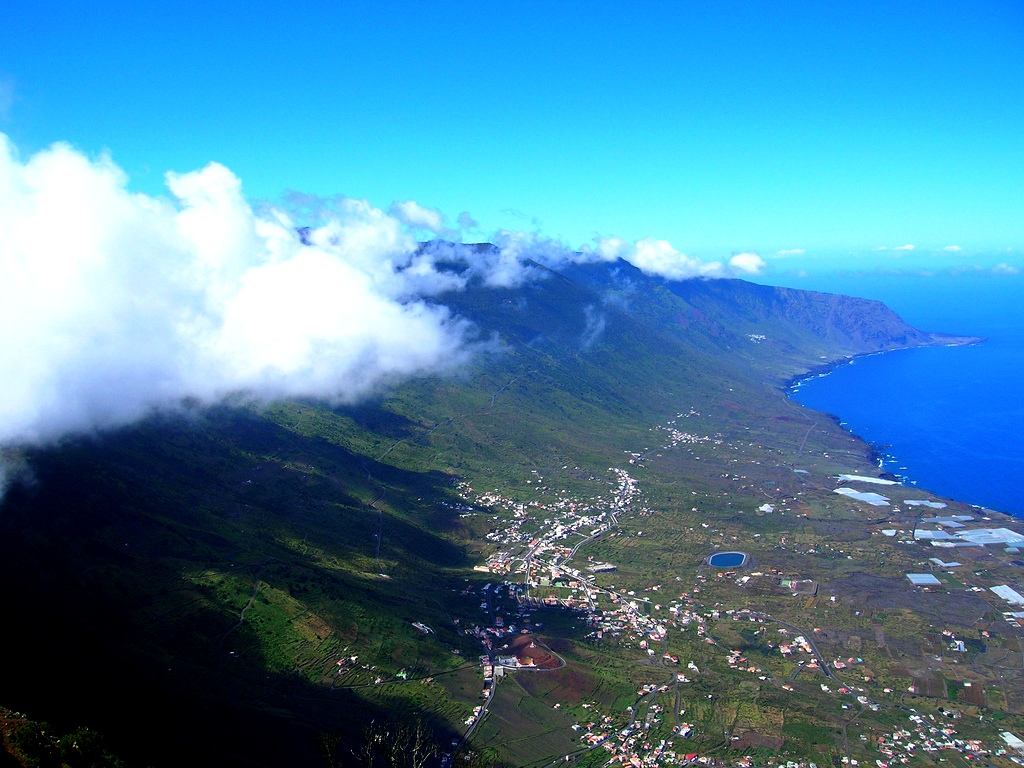
The El Golfo landslide scarp on El Hierro. Tanganasoga is the central peak in the photograph, partially obscured by cloud.

There is evidence of at least three major gravitational landslides that have affected El Hierro in the last few hundred thousand years. The most recent of these was the 'El Golfo' landslide that occurred about 15 thousand years ago, involving collapse of the northern flank of the island. The landslide formed the El Golfo valley and created a debris avalanche with a volume of 150–180 km^{3}. Turbidite deposits related to this landslide have been recognized in drill cores from the Agadir Basin to the north of the Canary Islands. Detailed analysis of these deposits suggests that the slope failure did not occur as a single event but a series of smaller failures over a period of hours or days. Local tsunami are likely to have been triggered by these landslides but no evidence has been found to confirm this. Tanganasoga formed near the top of the El Golfo landslide headwall, on the upper part of the north-facing scarp slope.

== Recent volcanic activity ==
Perhaps as a mark of the island's relative isolation, only one eruption has ever been recorded on the island, from the Volcan de Lomo Negro vent of Tanganasoga in 1793. The eruption lasted a month.

It is considered that the 2011-2012 El Hierro eruption at La Restinga in the southernmost part of the island is a vent of Tanganasoga. Swift deformation of Tanganasoga was recorded during the October 2011-March 2012 eruptive phase of this volcanic activity, and in June 2012 a new phase was heralded by earthquakes and rapid deformation upwards and outwards of Tanganasoga, indicating the deep-seated movement of magma below.

== See also ==
- 2011-2012 El Hierro eruption
