= Lava balloon =

Floating bubble of lava

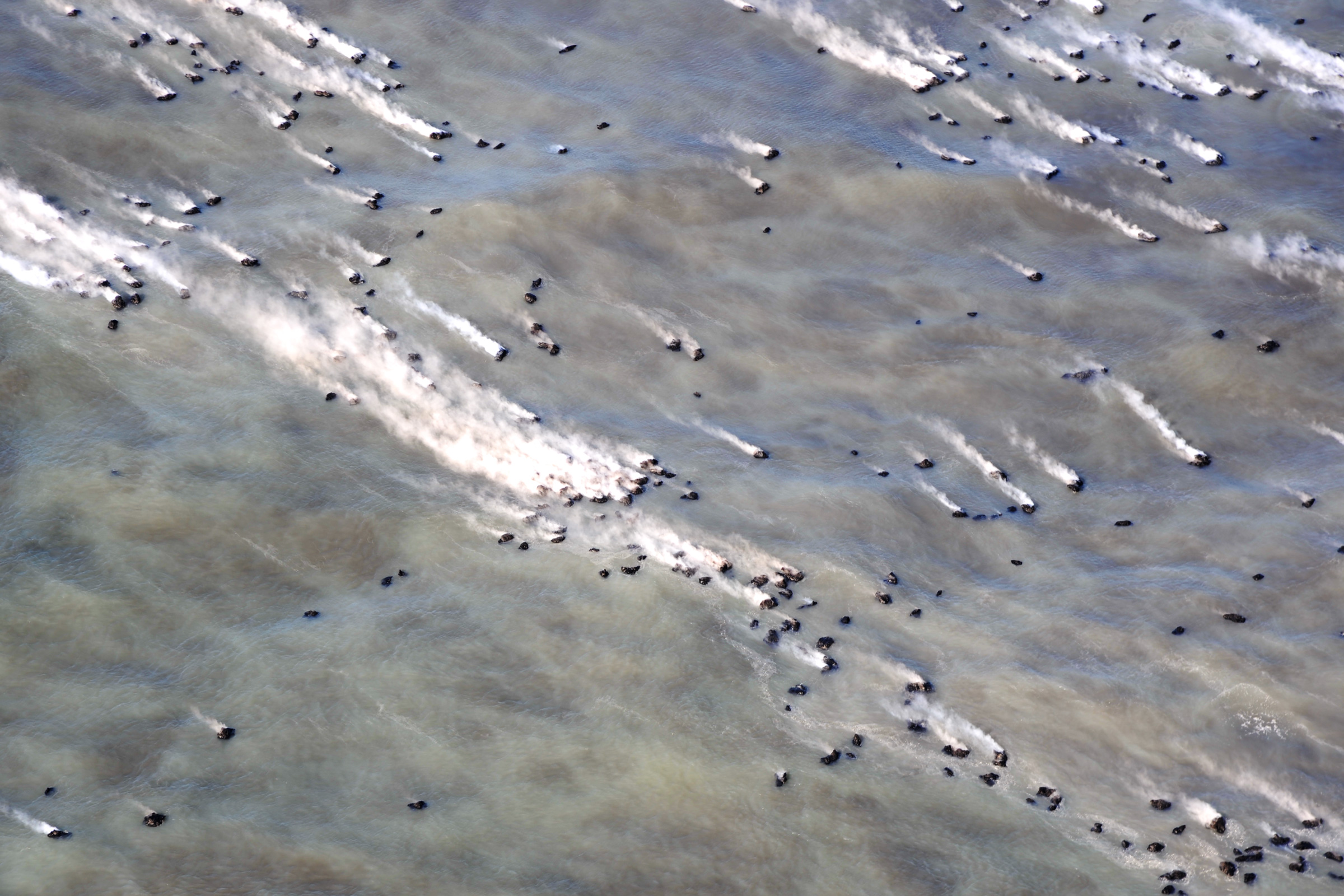
Lava balloons during the 2011–12 El Hierro eruption, floating on discoloured water

A lava balloon is a gas-filled bubble of lava that floats on the sea surface. It can be up to several metres in size. When it emerges from the sea, it is usually hot and often steaming. After floating for some time it fills with water and sinks again.

Lava balloons can form in lava flows entering the sea and at volcanic vents, but they are not common. They have been observed in the Azores, Canary Islands, Hawaii, Japan, Mariana Islands and Mexico. Apparently, they are generated when gases trapped within magma form large bubbles that eventually rise to the sea surface. In the Canary Islands, balloons containing sediments were used to infer the age of the basement on which the volcano is constructed; these sediments were also at first misinterpreted as evidence of an impending large explosive eruption.

== Appearance ==
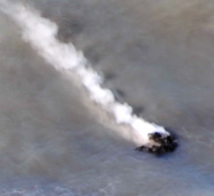
Detail of a single lava balloon from the above image

Lava balloons are gas-filled bubbles surrounded by a crust formed by lava; their gas content allows them to float on the sea surface. Observed sizes range from 0.3 metres (1 ft 0 in) at El Hierro (Canary Islands) during the 2011–2012 eruption to about 3 metres (9.8 ft) at Terceira on their long axis with rounded shapes. They have one or sometimes several large cavities surrounded by a 3–8-centimetre-thick (1.2–3.1 in) crust. The outer part of the crust is highly vesicular and striated and has delicate flow structures that can be seen using a scanning electron microscope. It is fragile and often breaks off the balloon. The inner part of the crust is separated from the outer part by orange and white layers. It is subdivided into three inward-thickening layers, all of which contain varying amounts of vesicles that become larger toward the interior. Recovered lava balloons and associated rocks are on display in the UGGp museum on El Hierro.

== Occurrence ==
Lava balloons have been described from Terceira Island in the Azores, at Teishi Knoll of Izu-Tobu (Japan) in 1989, El Hierro, offshore Pantelleria (Foerstner volcano, Italy) in 1891 and Kealakekua Bay (Mauna Loa, Hawaii) in 1877. Similar floating scoria blocks containing reticulite (Note: Reticulites are extremely vesicular magmatic rocks that are foamy.) were observed in 1993–1994 at Socorro, Mexico. As of 2012, lava balloons have been observed only at these sites, although the increasing number of observations might indicate that this is a common mode of submarine volcanism.

A similar style of eruption but involving silicic magmas has also been found and christened "Tangaroan", after the research ship RV Tangaroa that carried out research on the Macauley caldera. (Note: In turn, the ship is named after the Māori sea god Tangaroa.) Balloon-like structures were observed in 1934–1935 at Shin-Iwo-jima, Japan, and at West Rota in the Marianas. At Macauley Island in the Kermadec Islands such a style of eruption has been inferred and used to explain the presence of large rocks at substantial distances from the volcanic vent.

== Observations ==
Lava balloons observed during a 1998–2000 eruption at Terceira are considered to be the most noteworthy expression of that eruption. They were described as steaming dark objects floating on the sea, hot enough to damage fishing ropes. At first, they were thought to be dead whales or trunks. They surfaced in batches over a span of several months, clustering in particular areas that appear to reflect the position of active volcanic vents on the seafloor but also wind and ocean current driven transport. Sometimes, hundreds of balloons were observed on a given occasion, accompanied by gas bubbles (i.e. gas slug) and particles shed by the balloons, all of which rose through the water in the form of plumes. The balloons steamed at first under their own heat, forming small vapour plumes and hissing sounds. Their insides could reach temperatures of over 900 °C (1,650 °F) and were sometimes incandescent. Balloons usually floated for less than 15 minutes before sinking again as water penetrated them through cracks in the crust and gases escaped. Sometimes, however, explosions threw fragments for tens of meters when water interacted with a hot interior. Remotely operated underwater vehicle (ROV) observations of the putative vent area found debris that may have come from lava balloons.

The Pantelleria eruption generated scoriaceous and vesicular floating structures with sizes exceeding 1 metre (3 ft 3 in) that sank again beneath the water surface after they had become saturated with water. 1892 descriptions of lava balloons about the Pantelleria eruption resemble the Terceira balloons. The eruption was discovered thanks to its balloons. As reported by fishers, black balloons of lava floated on the sea, sometimes propelled by steam jets and sometimes exploding with up to 20 metres (66 ft) high debris fountains. As with Terceira, they were accompanied by gas bubbles and many of them were hot enough to melt zinc. (Note: That is, with a temperature of at least 415 °C (779 °F).) Water entering the balloons evaporated from the heat, thus delaying their filling. Eventually, the balloons filled with water and sank again.

At El Hierro, lava balloons were erupted from 27 November 2011 until 23 February 2012 and often exploded upon reaching the sea surface. On the seafloor close to the vent were balloons with various shapes including amphora-like and sizes reaching over 4 metres (13 ft). They had sunk to the seafloor immediately after being ejected from the vent and had sometimes spilled magma. The amphora-like shape appears to have formed when floating balloons degassed through vents at their top and the balloons deformed. On the seafloor, the ballons were buried by later pillow lavas. Towards the end of the eruption, some lava balloons had a thin layer of solidified magma around a glassy core and appeared to float for longer times, allowing them to reach the coast. The balloons were named "restingoliths" and the glassy core "xeno-pumice". Similar balloons were observed at Teishi Knoll and appear to form when sediments are incorporated into lava and melted, forming a pumice-like structure. At El Hierro, the origin of the cores gave rise to a scientific debate about whether they originated as sediment or as silicic magma; now there is agreement that they formed out of sediments. In Socorro, the cores of lava balloons contained reticulite.

In Kealakekua Bay, over a hundred lava balloons were observed. They emitted sulfurous gases and steam and were hot inside, even incandescent. As ships were moving across the area rising balloons in the water impacted their hulls but did not do any damage.

== Genesis ==
Large floating pumice blocks such as these observed in Kikai, Japan, in 1934–1935 may be comparable to lava balloons, but they are produced by eruptions of felsic magma, which are rich in silicates and lighter elements. By contrast, lava balloons are generally produced by eruptions of alkali basalt, although few basaltic eruptions produce them.

Lava balloons are probably limited to a depth range of 30–1,000 metres (98–3,281 ft): too deep, and gas bubbles do not form; too shallow, and degassing fragments the rocks. Only a few sufficiently large balloons can rise all the way to the sea surface; smaller ones fill quickly with water and sink. Overly crystalline magma may render a crust too brittle to form a lava balloon.

Several different mechanisms have been invoked to explain the genesis of lava balloons. Water that penetrates the lava can boil and the resulting vapours can inflate the balloons and make them float, although for Terceira a non-water gas composition has been inferred. They are usually observed when lava flows enter the sea. They appear to form when water is trapped in lava as it flows onto a beach with waves or enters lava tubes; in the latter case, entrained water can be transported through the tube and eventually end up in developing pillow lavas which are rendered buoyant by water vapour bubbles.

Less commonly, as in Terceira, balloons and accompanying gas bubbles appear to have formed on volcanic vents rather than at the front of lava flows, and more specifically on volcanic vents where magma ponded. There, gas emanating from a gas-rich magma accumulated below a crust on top of lava, forming blisters that eventually reached a critical buoyancy and broke off, forming lava balloons. (Note: Originally, it was proposed that the magma trapped within a balloon continued to degas as it rose and the gases accumulated underneath a skin formed by quenched magma, inflating the balloon as long as liquid magma was still present within the balloon to generate new crust. Later analyses suggested that the balloons reached their final size at the volcanic vent and did not further expand as they rose; the expanding gases in their interiors leaked out and formed gas bubbles. Moreover, there is little evidence that the structure of the balloons changed once they had detached from the vent. On the other hand, there is clear evidence of a molten interior for lava balloons found at Pantelleria.) The high gas content and low viscosity of the magma during the Terceira eruption allowed balloons to form despite the vents being located at considerable depth.

Finally, lava fountaining processes have been proposed to form balloons underwater. According to this model, slabs of magma in the water are surrounded by a thin shell which traps exoluting gases but also magma. The trapped gases inflate the shell and make it buoyant, while the remnant magma maintains the shell as it expands.

== Impact ==
On São Miguel Island in the Azores, lava balloons are considered to be one of the main volcanic hazards stemming from submarine volcanic eruptions. Early lava balloons erupted during the 2011–2012 El Hierro eruption contained xeno-pumice, which raised concerns that evolved (Note: Evolved magmas are magmas which due to a settling of crystals have lost part of their magnesium oxide.) magmas such as phonolite and trachyte, capable of generating explosive eruptions, might be present under the volcano. As the eruption continued, these concerns together with an outburst of gas led to the evacuation of the town of La Restinga. The link between xeno-pumice and evolved magmas was contested early on; when explosive eruptions did not occur, this led to complaints that the response to the eruption had been disproportionate especially given its effect on the economy. The management of the El Hierro eruption in general attracted intense criticism.

At El Hierro, the crevice-rich submarine terrain formed by sunk lava balloons and lava bombs forms a particular habitat. Animal species encountered there include the decapod Plesionika narval.

== Scientific significance ==
At El Hierro, foraminifera fossils found in the glassy cores of lava balloons have been inferred to originate from sediments that underlie the El Hierro volcano. These fossils indicate a Cretaceous–Pliocene age for these sediments, implying that El Hierro rests on the youngest sediment base of the archipelago. The progressively lower age of the islands from east to west reinforces the theory that the Canary Islands are on top of a hotspot. Furthermore, it has been proposed that lava balloons might be proof of shallow-water volcanic eruptions.

== See also ==
- Lithophysa
- Pumice raft
