= Balloon popping =

Making a hole in a balloon

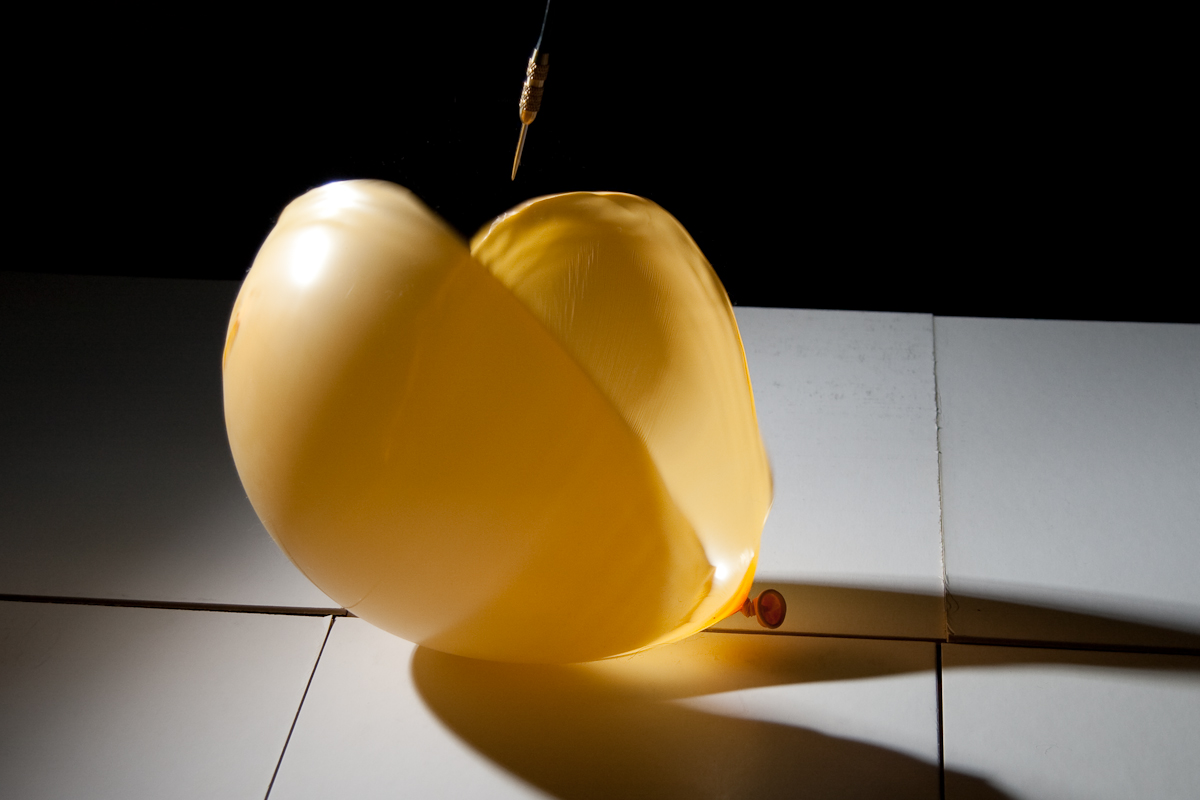
A high-speed photograph of a popped balloon

A balloon pops when the material that makes up its surface tears or shreds, creating a hole. Normally, there is a balance of the balloon skin's elastic tension in which every point on the balloon's surface is being pulled by the material surrounding it. However, if a hole is made on the balloon's surface, the force becomes imbalanced, since there is no longer any force exerted by the center of the hole on the material at its edge. As a result, the balloon's surface at the edge of the hole pulls away, making it bigger; the high pressure air can then escape through the hole and the balloon pops. A balloon can be popped by either physical or chemical actions. Limpanuparb et al. use popping a balloon as a demonstration to teach about physical and chemical hazards in laboratory safety.

== Physical ==
Balloon skewer experiment

A pin or needle is frequently used to pop a balloon. As the needle or pin creates a hole on the balloon surface, the balloon pops. However, if tape is placed on the part where the hole is created, the balloon will not pop since the tape helps reinforce the elastic tension in that area, preventing the edges of the hole pulling away from the center. Likewise, the thick spots of the balloon at the top and the bottom can be pierced by a needle, pin, or even skewer without the balloon popping.

== Chemical ==
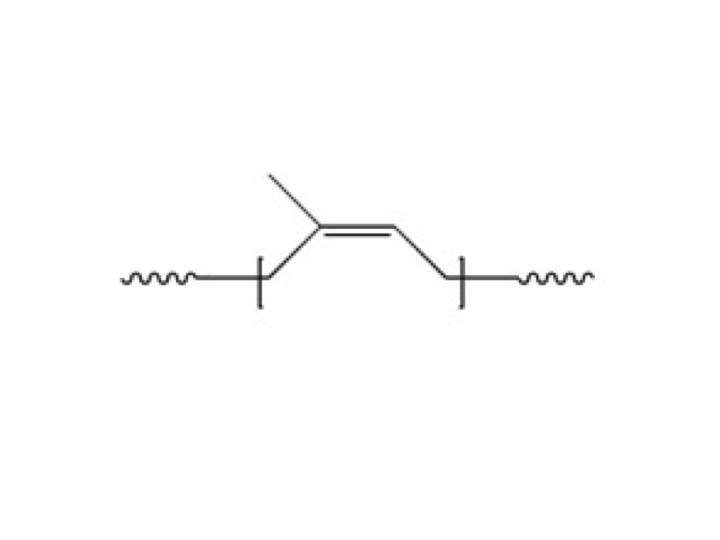
cis-1,4-polyisoprene

toluene

limonene

=== Organic solvent ===
A balloon popped by toluene

Applying an organic solvent such as toluene onto a balloon's surface can pop it, since the solvent can partially dissolve the material making up the balloon's surface.

cis-1,4-polyisoprene (solid) + organic solvent → cis-1,4-polyisoprene (partly dissolved)

Baby oil can also be applied to water balloons to pop them.

=== Orange peel ===
Orange peel contains a compound called limonene which is a hydrocarbon compound similar to the rubber that can be used to make balloons. Based on "like dissolves like" principle, rubber balloons can be dissolved by limonene, popping the balloon. If the balloon is vulcanized (hardened with sulfur), the balloon will not pop.

== Gallery ==
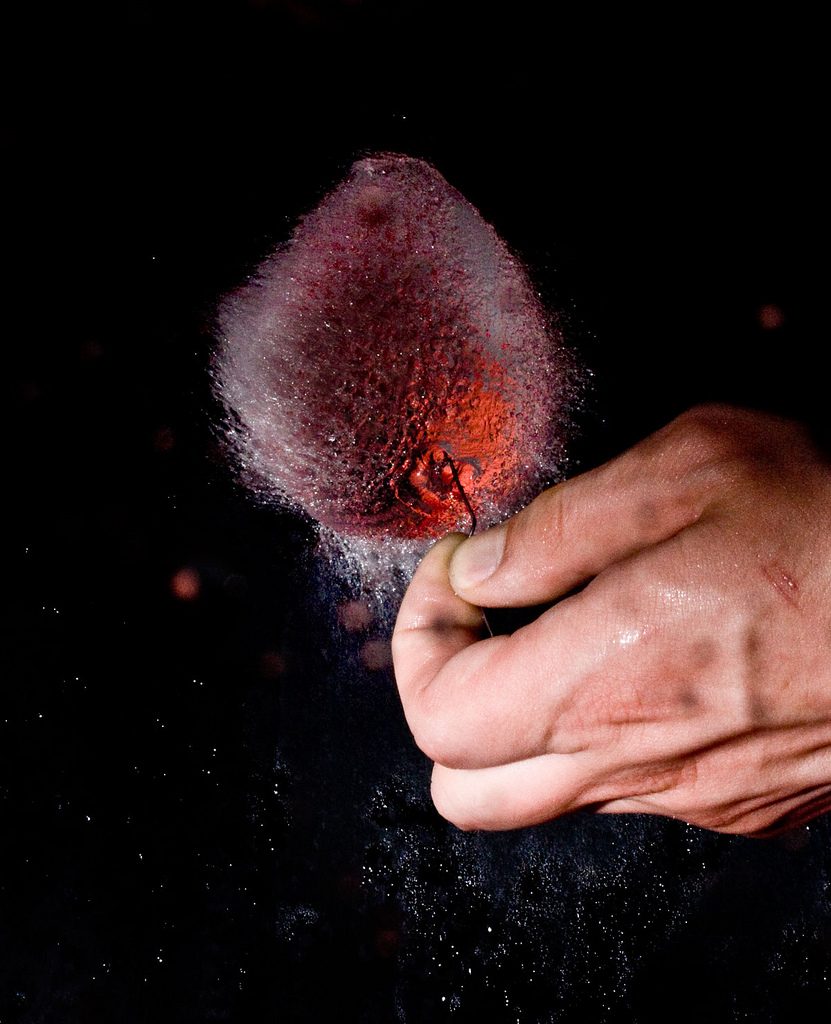
Pricking a filled water balloon

High-speed capture of water balloon popping

Pricking an air balloon

A balloon popped by toluene

Balloon skewer demonstration

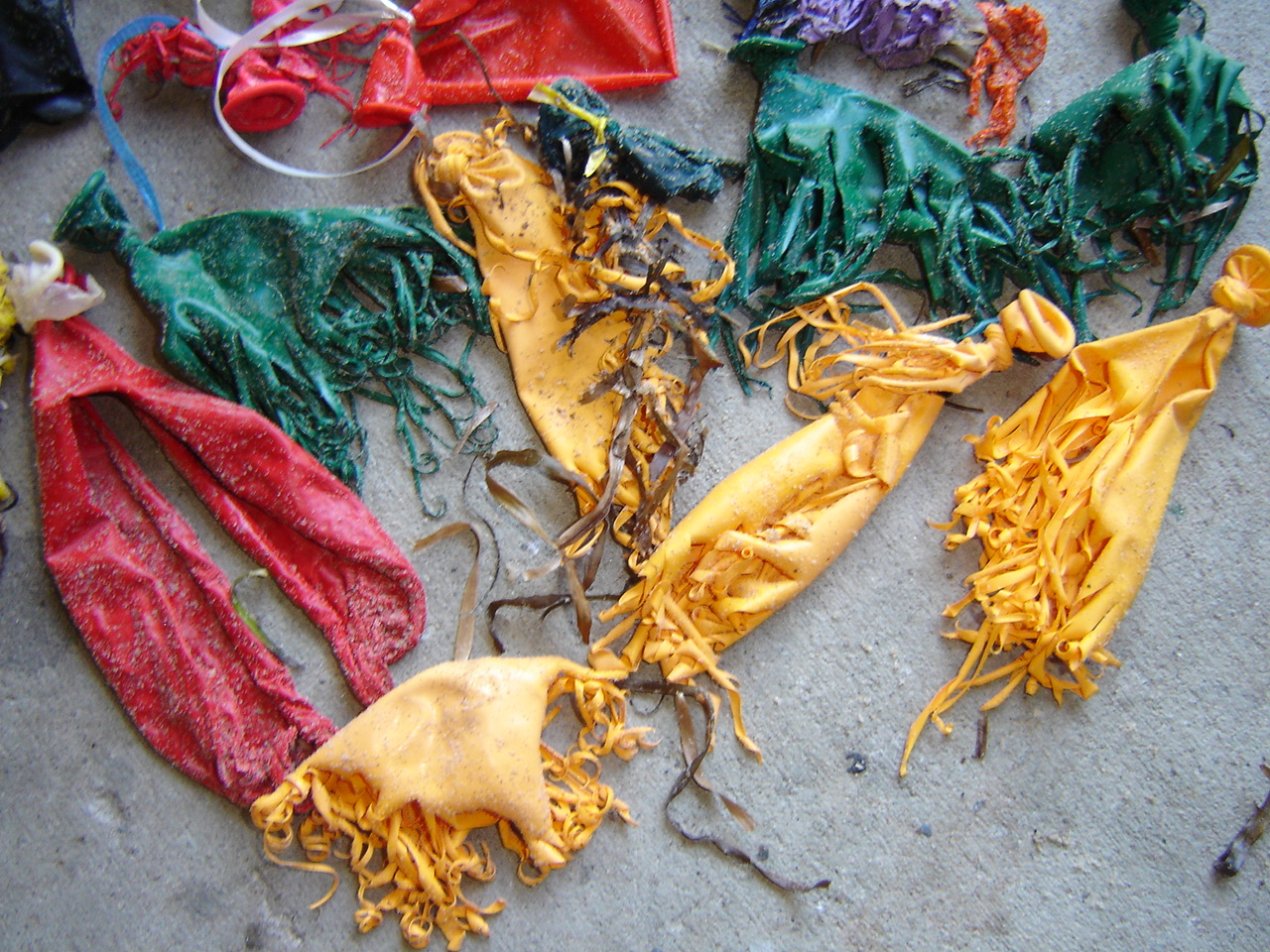
Popped balloons on a beach

== See also ==
- Balloon phobia
