= California Balloon Law =

1990 state law regulating foil balloons

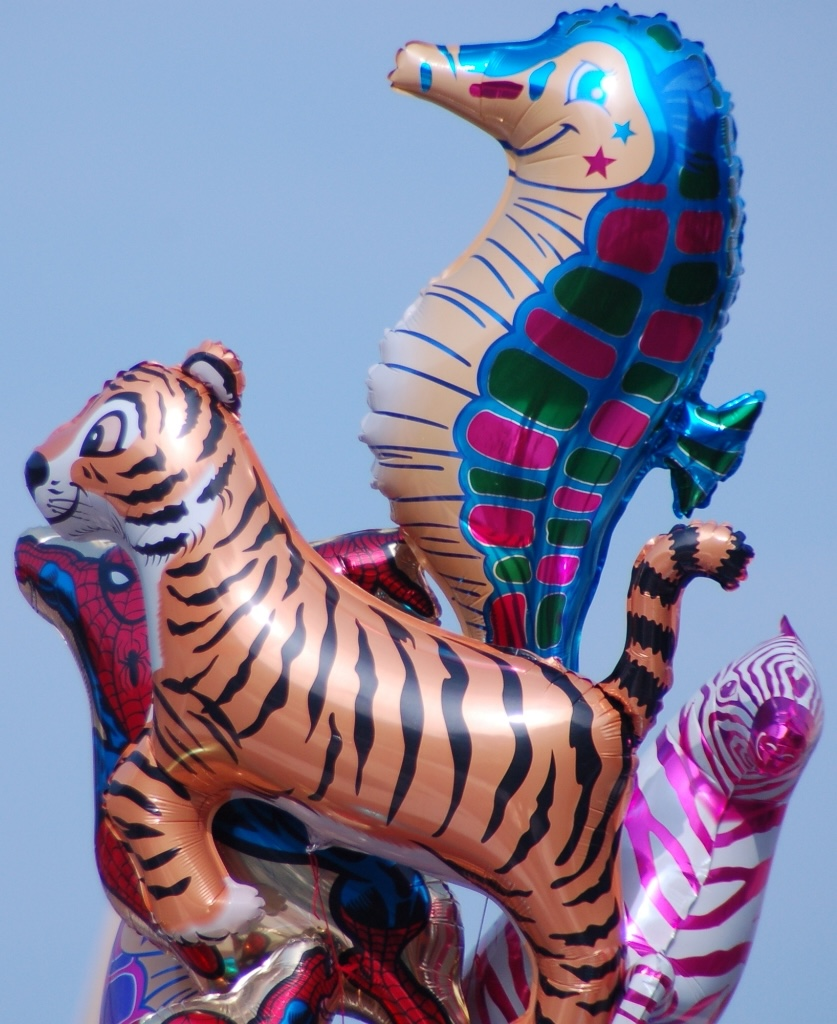
California laws regulate the sale of metallized Mylar balloons

In 1990 the California State Legislature passed SB 1990, enacting a Balloon Law to regulate the sales and use of helium-filled foil balloons. The law was passed in an effort to reduce power outages due to metallized Mylar or foil balloons.

The balloon law prohibits the sale or distribution of a balloon that is constructed of electrically conductive material (metallized Mylar or foil) and filled with a gas lighter than air (helium), without affixing an object of sufficient weight to the balloon to counter the lift capability, affixing a specified warning statement on the balloon, and affixing a printed identification of the balloon's manufacturer. The law also prohibits a person from selling or distributing a balloon filled with a gas lighter than air that is attached to an electrically conductive string, tether, streamer, or other electrically conductive appurtenance, or attached to another balloon, as specified.

Existing law also prohibits a person or group from releasing outdoors balloons made of electrically conductive material (balloon release) and filled with a gas lighter than air at specified events. A violation of those provisions is an infraction or a misdemeanor, as specified.

To be in accordance with the California Balloon Law and reduce electrical power outages, all retail shops that sell balloons should follow the guidelines below:

- Weight all helium-filled foil balloons
- Tie all ribbons to the weight so if they are released they will float away individually. Do not tie ribbons together before attaching to weight. Tie them to the weight with one knot each.
- Do not use metallic ribbon with helium-filled balloons

Although the law was put into effect in 1990, the issue of foil balloons being a hazard resurfaced in 2008. A senate bill was proposed to ban the sale of all foil balloons by the year 2010 due to the increased number of power outages. The bill was California Senate Bill 1499.

== Senate Bill 1499 ==
Senate Bill 1499, proposed by Senator Jack Scott to the California State Senate on May 29, 2008, would have banned foil-lined party balloons in California because of the power outages they cause when they snag on power lines.

According to the Pacific Gas and Electric Company, there are 100–150 power outages each year due to metallic balloons. These power outages affect thousands of customers statewide and are costly to repair. A study in 2007 indicated that Pacific Gas & Electric, Southern California Edison, and Burbank Water and Power experienced hundreds of balloon-related power outages that cost businesses $120 million annually.

Opponents to SB 1499 included florists, special-event planners, and small businesses, who said the bill could cost them $100 million, which could translate to loss of as much as $80 million in tax revenues for the state. Many of these companies started a grassroots campaign called “Save Our Balloons”.

Due to strong opposition by numerous groups, this bill was amended to require notification of potential power outages on all balloon weights and directs the University of California to work with the Public Utilities Commission to identify a cost-effective, consumer-friendly substitute for metallic balloons. The bill was originally intended to go into effect in 2010, but the version passed by the California senate would have gone into effect in January 2011. The bill was vetoed by Governor Schwarzenegger in September 2008. The California Balloon Law has remained the same since 1990.

== Assembly Bill 2450 ==
On February 14, 2018, Assemblymember Bill Quirk (D-Hayward) introduced AB 2450, which would "require manufacturers of metallic balloons print a permanent warning directly on the balloon which would warn consumers of the dangers of allowing a balloon to come into contact with powerlines."

== Assembly Bill 847 ==
On February 17, 2021, Assemblymember Bill Quirk (D-Hayward), introduced Assembly Bill 847, banning the sale of electrically conductive balloons that can damage electricity power lines, including mylar balloons, phased in over several years. On September 18, 2022, Govenor Newsom signed AB 847 into law. The full ban goes into effect on January 1, 2031.
