= Instituto Hidrográfico de la Marina =

Agency overview
- Formed: 1943
- Jurisdiction: Spain
- Headquarters: Plaza San Severiano 3, Cádiz

The Instituto Hidrográfico de la Marina (IHM; literally "Hydrographic Institute of the Navy") is a Spanish institution with responsibilities in the fields of hydrography, geodesy and photogrammetry, cartography, navigation and oceanography.

== History ==
The IHM was created via 30 December 1943 Law published on 1 January 1940, establishing it as a military body depending on the General Staff of the Navy. Fernando Balén García was appointed as first director of the IHM on 1 July 1944, serving for 22 years at the post.

Via a 1970 decree, the IHM was entrusted with ensuring the safety of navigation, obtaining and disseminating information on the sea and coastline, and contributing to the progress of nautical science.

The headquarters of the IHM are located in Cádiz, in San Severiano.

The IHM is the Spanish representative at the International Hydrographic Organization (IHO).
