= La Restinga =

Coordinates: 27.641°N 17.981°W

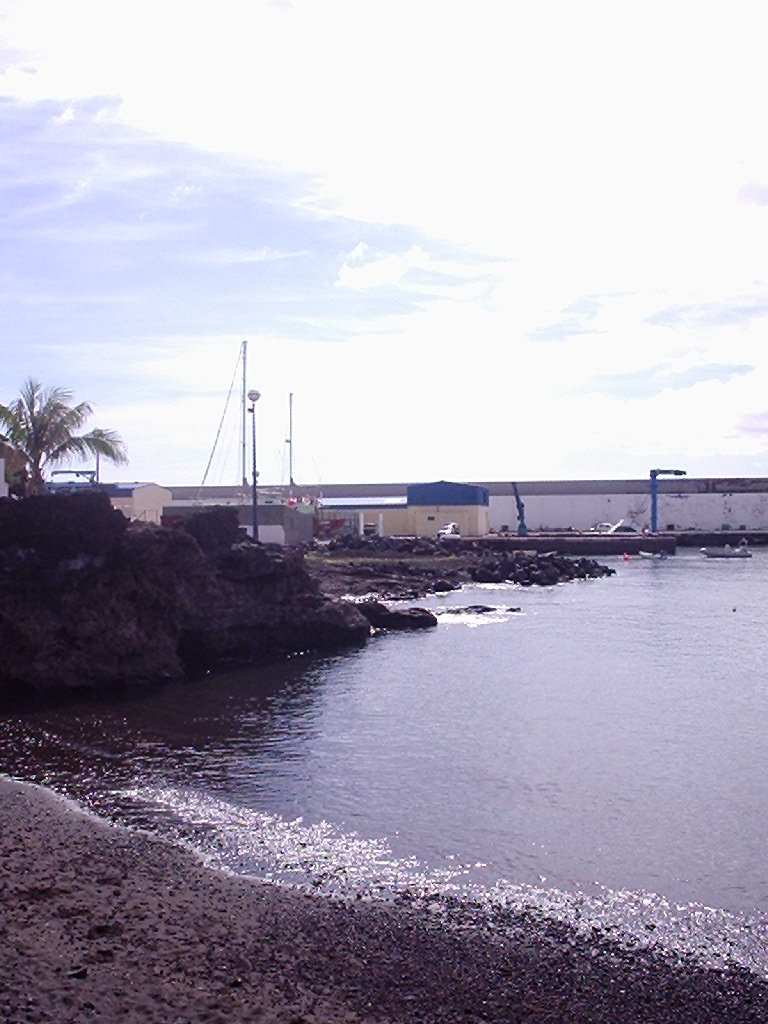
La Restinga Fishing Wharf

La Restinga is a locality and district belonging to the municipality of El Pinar de El Hierro, in the province of Santa Cruz de Tenerife. It is located at the southern tip of the Canarian island of El Hierro. On the Atlantic coast, La Restinga constitutes the southernmost settlement of all Spain.
