= Mediterranean Interregional Commission =

Committee of the United Cities and Local Governments

The Mediterranean Interregional Commission is one of the twelve Committees of the United Cities and Local Governments.

Within United Cities and Local Governments, the Interregional Mediterranean Commission is at the junction of three regional sections: Europe, Africa, and the Middle East/West Asia. The Mediterranean occupies a special place in UCLG due to the large number of direct members in the three regions North, South, and East of the Mediterranean and because of the many cooperation initiatives that connect local authorities and the common policies for regional development. Following the Med Urbs program, a "network culture" of trans-Mediterranean local authorities was created in the Mediterranean, reinforced by the Euro-Mediterranean partnership: Medcities, the network of Euromed cities (previously the Euromed group of Eurocities), the Standing Committee for the Euro Mediterranean Partnership of Local and Regional Authorities (COPPEM), the Europe-MENA Urban Network, Latin Arch, the Inter-Mediterranean Commission of the Conference of Peripheral Maritime Regions (CPMR), and the European network of local authorities for peace in the Middle East (COEPPO) are some of the networks that intersect with a variety of networks of civil society, universities and initiatives of the private sector. It appeared that the three regional sections of UCLG together could reinforce exchanges and encourage taking into consideration the specific interests of local Mediterranean authorities, whether on matters related to Euro-Mediterranean relations or on strategic issues like decentralization, urban development, or the environment, particularly access to and water management.

Within the "Mediterranean" context, the Mediterranean Commission brings added value as vital support to a dynamic process that will make possible:

- Providing visibility and legibility to the numerous initiatives of local authorities in the Mediterranean.

- Creating the necessary conditions for the actors of these initiatives to meet in order to share know-how and experiences, to avoid scattered and compartmentalized actions, and by doing so, to optimize their impact in the field; encouraging particularly North-South and South-South dialogue and knowledge exchanges.

- Gaining recognition of the importance of the local institutional sphere as designers, managers, and leaders of development policies that are the closest to the citizens, in a region where governance indicators show it is urgent to bring centers of power closer to the population.

- Bridging the gap between elected representatives and local decision-makers in the Mediterranean who due to longstanding conflicts, economic difficulties and cultural stereotypes stifle the feeling of sharing a common Mediterranean or Euro-Mediterranean destiny.

- Promoting adequate consideration of political Mediterranean issues from the perspective of local authorities: peace in the Middle East, conflict prevention ("Peace Keeping"), intercultural dialogue (North-North, North-South, and South-South) regional integration processes (Union of the Arab Maghreb), etc.

== History ==
The creation of a Mediterranean Commission within UCLG is not a new idea.

It was suggested in 2001 during the joint meeting in Tunis of the World Federation of United Cities and the International Union of Local Authorities (FMCU/IULA), before the unification congress of Paris in May 2004. During the congress in Paris, the President of the French Provence-Alpes-Côte d’Azur (PACA) region, the mayors of Marseille, Rome, and Tunis and the founding and honorary presidents of UCLG relaunched the idea of a Commission suggesting it could have its headquarters in Marseille. The principle of a Mediterranean Commission was adopted by the Executive Council in São Paulo and the creation of the Commission was ratified during the World Council of Beijing in June 2005. On May 18, 2005 a meeting was held in Marseille. Major local authorities of the Mediterranean and their national or international networks were invited to participate or to contribute in writing to the meeting during which a first definition of a "Mediterranean Commission" of UCLG was prepared, including its members, objectives, and a tentative agenda.

Milestones of the Mediterranean Commission of UCLG:

May 2006: A technical secretariat is set up in Marseille, financed by the City of Marseille and the Provence-Alpes-Côte d’Azur Region, with the support of Cités Unies France and the French Ministry of Foreign Affairs.

November 2006: Constitution of the political organs representing the three shores of the Mediterranean with a three-year mandate. Omar EL JAZOULI, Mayor of Marrakesh, becomes the first President of the Mediterranean Commission

October 2007: The mandate of the Mediterranean Commission is renewed during the Second World Congress of UCLG in Jeju.

February 2008: Mercedes Bresso, President of the Piedmont Region, becomes the second President of the Mediterranean Commission.

22 & 23 June 2008: Forum of Local and Regional Authorities of the Mediterranean.

June 2009: Abdel Moumen ARISS, Mayor of Beirut, becomes the third President of the Mediterranean Commission.

17 to 20 November 2010: The third UCLG Congress, held in Mexico, sees the renewal of the mandate of the Mediterranean Commission for three years.

== Objectives ==
The political scope of the Mediterranean Commission establishes UCLG as the largest framework for direct political exchanges between local elected representatives in the Mediterranean respecting a North-South balance that undertakes to:

- Promote local and regional autonomy and the institutional reinforcement of local authorities South and East of the Mediterranean, as well as their national networks or associations. To this end, the Commission favors structuring local authorities through its support to national associations of elected officials and local authorities of the South or by fostering their creation.

- Assure direct exchanges between the many different actors on common issues at Mediterranean scale, for example, the organization of the Permanent Forum of Local and Regional Authorities of the Mediterranean, an opportunity for dialogue and a special occasion to amplify the voice of Mediterranean local authorities and to allow exchanges between Mediterranean and non-Mediterranean politicians and actors.

- Develop decentralized cooperation and initiatives advocating common values that respect Mediterranean specificities.

- Engage in dialogue with donors of State and multilateral funds (French Development Agency, Bretton Woods Institutions, United Nations agencies, investment bank funds), and to promote closer relations with the institutions of the European Union (EU Parliament, EU Commission, Committee of the Regions) based on the expertise and the results obtained by the networks or by encouraging new types of collaboration.

- Defend the role and participation of local authorities in the Barcelona Process-Union for the Mediterranean, the new Neighborhood Policy and overall within the Mediterranean partnership.

- Seek to identify and promote concrete initiatives in favor of peace in the Middle East, conflict prevention (“Peace Keeping”), intercultural dialogue, regional integration processes and development throughout the entire region, leading to long-term exchanges and partnerships between territories (North-South, South-South).

- Engage in dialogue and take into consideration the work and proposals of civil society, in particular, economic actors, academics, and community associations.

- Construct a more stable and prosperous Mediterranean space.

== Organisation ==
Technical Committee: The technical committee consists of the heads of the principal European networks working in the Mediterranean, trans-Mediterranean networks, national associations of local authorities South and East of the Mediterranean, and representatives of national, European, or international institutions working in the Mediterranean.

Mediterranean Council: It is made up of elected local officials in positions of responsibility in European networks active in the Mediterranean, in trans-Mediterranean networks or national associations of local authorities South and East of the Mediterranean. It includes representatives of local authorities from countries where there are no structured networks and may be open to actors of the civil society during its meetings.

Bureau: The first bureau of the Mediterranean Commission of UCLG was established in the Commission’s meeting during the World Council of UCLG held in Marrakesh on Monday October 30, 2006. On the basis of a rotating tripartite presidency it was composed of elected members representing the three shores of the Mediterranean: for Europe: Mercedes Bresso, President of the Piedmont Region (Italy), for the Maghreb: Omar El Jazouli, Mayor of Marrakesh (Morocco) and for the Middle East: Abdel Mounim Ariss, Mayor of Beirut (Lebanon). Mr Jean-Claude Gaudin, Mayor of Marseille and Mr Michel Vauzelle, President of the Provence Alpes Côte d’Azur Region, were the vice-presidents. Following the renewal of the mandate of the Mediterranean Commission of UCLG at the World Congress of Mexico in November 2010, a new bureau will be constituted soon.

The Commission’s Headquarters and the Technical Secretariat are located in Marseilles.

=== Members ===
The Mediterranean Commission is open to members of UCLG and to thematic or general networks of Mediterranean local and regional authorities. Territorial authorities that are not members of UCLG and that wish to join the Commission may do so by sending a written request to the president of the Commission.

== Activities ==
In its technical dimension, the Mediterranean Commission of UCLG does not seek to be an additional network nor an additional operator. By becoming a center of resources, on a Mediterranean scale, for projects, procedures, and mechanisms concerning territorial authorities, the Mediterranean Commission offers an overview of strategies and opportunities in the region. It brings closer the supply and the needs in the cooperation process by:

- Capitalizing on and disseminating knowledge and expertise in local and territorial management, urban development and decentralized cooperation—in a multilateral framework—by relaying calls for proposals, projects, or ideas for the implementation of innovative forms of cooperation.

- Providing technical assistance to Mediterranean project leaders (local authorities and their networks and associations): assistance with legal, administrative, and financial aspects of the implementation of projects of local authorities and their networks.

- Carrying on the technical assistance over the long term through the implementation of tools that will contribute to the visibility and evaluation of activities of local authorities: website, database, technical data, newsletter.

- Carrying out action research on Mediterranean issues and publication of work aimed at practical applications, particularly the creation of groups of experts who may work on specific problems and/or geographical areas.

- Organizing technical workshops and training on topics chosen by local authorities and their networks.

== Meetings ==
- November 20, 2008 : Debate on the involvement of local and regional authorities in Euro-Mediterranean policies, Marseille (France).
- May 25 & 26, 2009 : Regional seminar for local authorities - Balkans: "Methods and tools for the development of territories", in Sarajevo (Bosnia and Herzegovina).
- October 9, 2009: Conference on territorial attractiveness in the Mediterranean, within the Mediterranean Economic Week, Marseille (France).
- November 23 & 24, 2009 : International conference on the Contribution of local and regional authorities to the Water Strategy of the Union for the Mediterranean, Lyon (France).
- 29 November – 4 December 2010 : Mediterranean Economic Week, Marseille (France)
