= Southern Europe =

Southern region of Europe

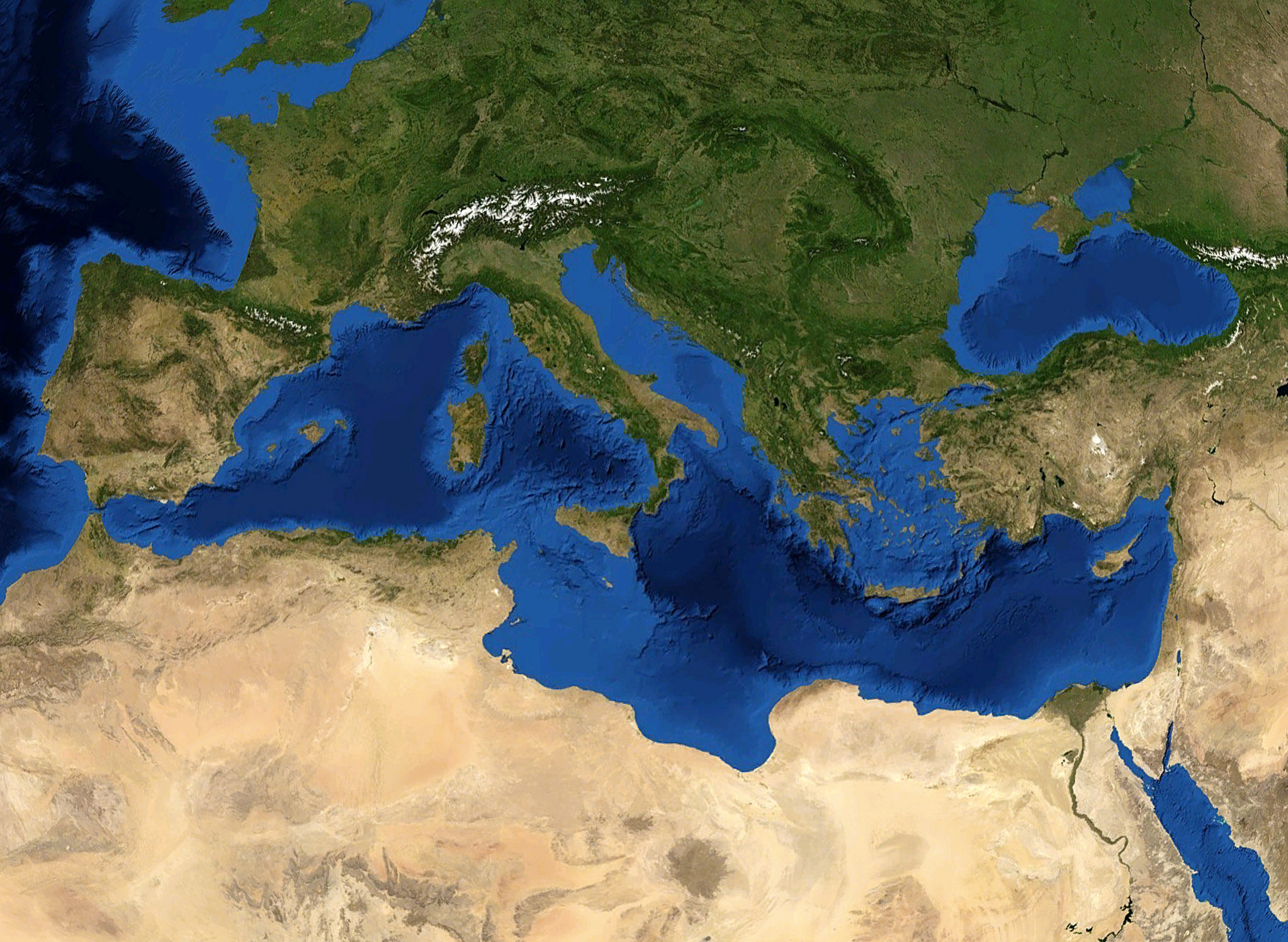
The geographical borders of southern Europe are the Pyrenees, the Alps, and the Balkan Mountains to the north and the Mediterranean Sea to the south.

Southern Europe is a loosely defined region of Europe. It is also known as Mediterranean Europe, as its geography is marked by the Mediterranean Sea. Southern Europe is focused on the three peninsulas located in the extreme south of the European continent. These are the Iberian Peninsula, the Italian Peninsula, and the Balkan Peninsula. These peninsulas are separated from the rest of Europe by towering mountain ranges, respectively by the Pyrenees, the Alps, and the Balkan Mountains. The location of these three peninsulas in the Mediterranean Sea, as well as their mountainous reliefs, provide them with very different types of climates (mainly subtropical and Mediterranean) from the rest of the continent.

Various other methods can be used to define Southern Europe, including its political, economic, historical, and cultural attributes. Politically, nine of the southern European countries form the EU Med Group. Southern Europe also loosely corresponds to the European part of the Mediterranean Basin.

Southern Europe has been shaped by a long and complex history rooted in the Mediterranean world. Early civilizations such as the Phoenicians established extensive trade networks that linked the region's coasts and islands. Ancient Greece and Rome later integrated much of Southern Europe into a shared classical framework constituting the base of European civilization. During the Middle Ages, Southern Europe experienced centuries of political fragmentation and external invasions. The Renaissance and the Age of Discovery expanded Southern Europe's influence and global connections, in particular to Latin America. From the late modern period onward, however, Southern Europe generally lagged behind northern Europe in industrialization and economic development, remaining more agrarian and subject to political instability. This gap persisted into the 20th century, despite later industrial growth and modernization.

== Geography ==
Geographically, Southern Europe is the southern portion of the European continent. This definition is relative, although largely based on history, culture, climate, and flora, which is shared across the region. Southern Europe is primarily shaped by the Mediterranean Sea, while also encompassing territories bordering the Atlantic Ocean to the west and the Black Sea to the east, as well as inland regions, often mountainous in character. Southern Europe can be subdivided into three geographically separate subregions:

- The westernmost region (Southwest Europe), which consists mainly of the Iberian Peninsula, separated from the rest of Europe by the Pyrenees, a mountain range forming a nearly straight line from the Atlantic Ocean to the western Mediterranean Sea. It also consists of the Balearic Islands. The region is shared by five countries:
  - Andorra
  - Portugal (mainland)
  - Spain (mainland and Balearic Islands)
  - Part of France: Cerdagne in the Pyrénées-Orientales (Note: Located in the Ebro Basin of the Iberian Peninsula. France as a whole is usually defined as a Western European country.)
  - Part of the United Kingdom: Gibraltar (Note: A British Overseas Territory.)
- The most central region, which consists mainly of the Italian Peninsula, (Note: If the smaller Apennine Peninsula (bordered by the Apennines) is considered, then the region excludes most of Northern Italy and the southern slopes of the Alps) (Note: Most of the Italian Peninsula is on the Eurasian Plate, while some parts such as Apulia are on the Adriatic Plate. Pantelleria, the Pelagian Islands, and some parts of Sicily are located on the African Plate, near the boundary between the African Plate and the Eurasian Plate.) separated from the rest of Europe by the Alps, a mountain range forming an arc from the western Mediterranean Sea to the Adriatic Sea. It also consists of the islands of Sicily, Sardinia, Corsica, and Malta. The region is shared by nine countries:
  - Italy (Note: The United Nations geoscheme includes Italy as a whole in Southern Europe, although its northernmost regions are sometimes associated with Central Europe.)
  - Malta (Note: Malta is located about halfway between mainland Europe and Africa. In geology, the Maltese Islands is located on the African Plate. The island group lies approx. 200 km south of the boundary between the African Plate and the Eurasian Plate. In political geography, Malta is considered a European country. The United Nations geoscheme includes Malta in Southern Europe.)
  - Monaco (Note: Sometimes included. The United Nations geoscheme includes Monaco in Western Europe.)
  - San Marino
  - Vatican City
  - Part of Croatia: Istria County
  - Part of France: Alpes-Maritimes and Corsica (Note: The United Nations geoscheme includes France as a whole in Western Europe.)
  - Part of Slovenia: municipalities of Ankaran, Izola, Koper, and Piran
  - Part of Switzerland: Ticino (Note: Located in the Po Basin on the south side of the Alps. Switzerland as a whole is usually considered a Western or Central European country.)
- The easternmost region (Southeastern Europe), a loosely defined region which consists mainly of the Balkans, the peninsula between the Adriatic, Aegean and Black Sea, with the Danube forming part of its northern border, rather than the Balkan Mountains themselves (to the south). It also consists of numerous islands in the Adriatic and in the Aegean Sea (notably Crete). The region is shared by a dozen of countries:
  - Albania
  - Bosnia and Herzegovina
  - Bulgaria (Note: Often included. The United Nations geoscheme includes Bulgaria in Eastern Europe.)
  - Croatia
  - Greece (Note: Some Greek offshore islands near Asia Minor are considered parts of Asia in physical geography.)
  - Kosovo
  - Montenegro
  - North Macedonia
  - Serbia (Note: Excepting the province of Vojvodina)
  - Part of Romania: Northern Dobruja (Note: Sometimes included. The United Nations geoscheme includes Romania in Eastern Europe.)
  - Part of Slovenia: southernmost part
  - Part of Turkey: East Thrace (Note: The European part of Turkey.)

Additionally, several other countries are politically or culturally associated with Southern Europe without being geographically part of it. These include Cyprus (an island south of the Anatolian Peninsula), (Note: Geographically a part of Asia, considered a European country in political geography. The United Nations geoscheme includes Cyprus in Western Asia.) and Moldova (along with the remaining part of Romania, north of the Balkan Peninsula). (Note: Occasionally included. The United Nations geoscheme includes Moldova in Eastern Europe.) Further east, the coastal regions of the Black Sea and the Caspian Sea constitute the southernmost regions of Eastern Europe, (Note: At latitudes similar to those of central and northern Italy) although they fall outside the core definitions of Southern Europe.

Punta de Tarifa, in Spain, constitutes the southernmost point of the European continent. Gavdos, in Greece, is the southernmost European island.

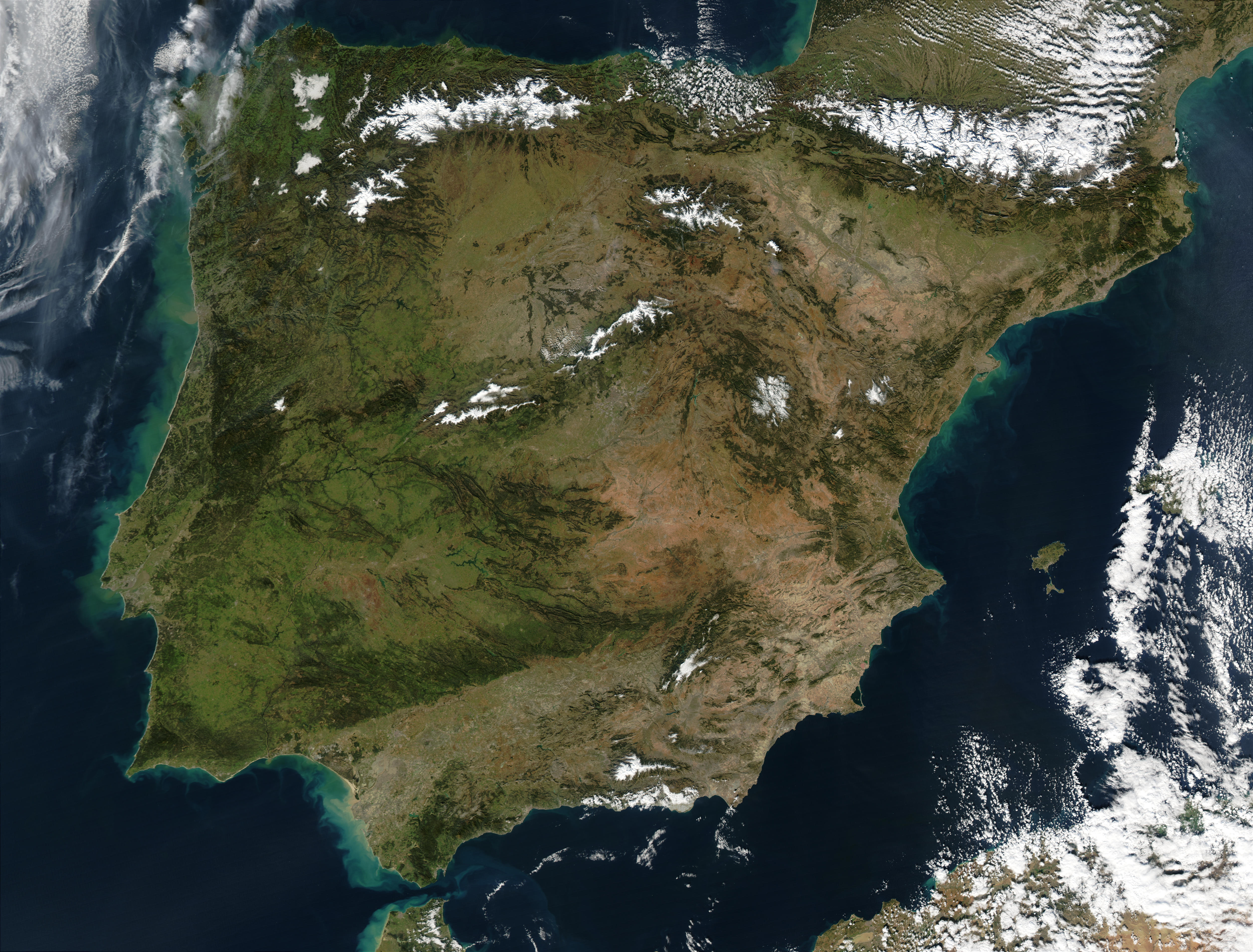
Satellite image of the Iberian Peninsula

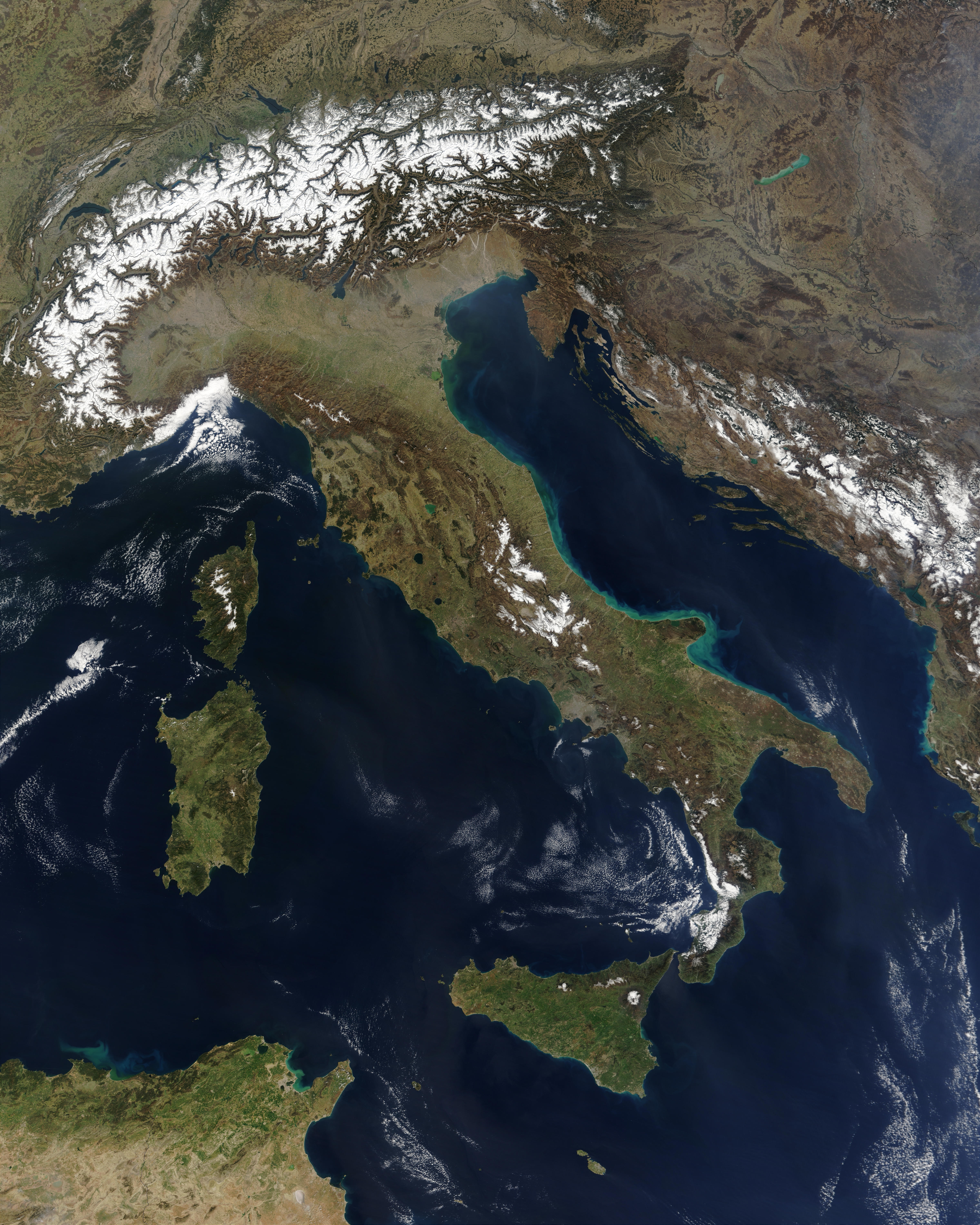
Satellite image of the Italian Peninsula

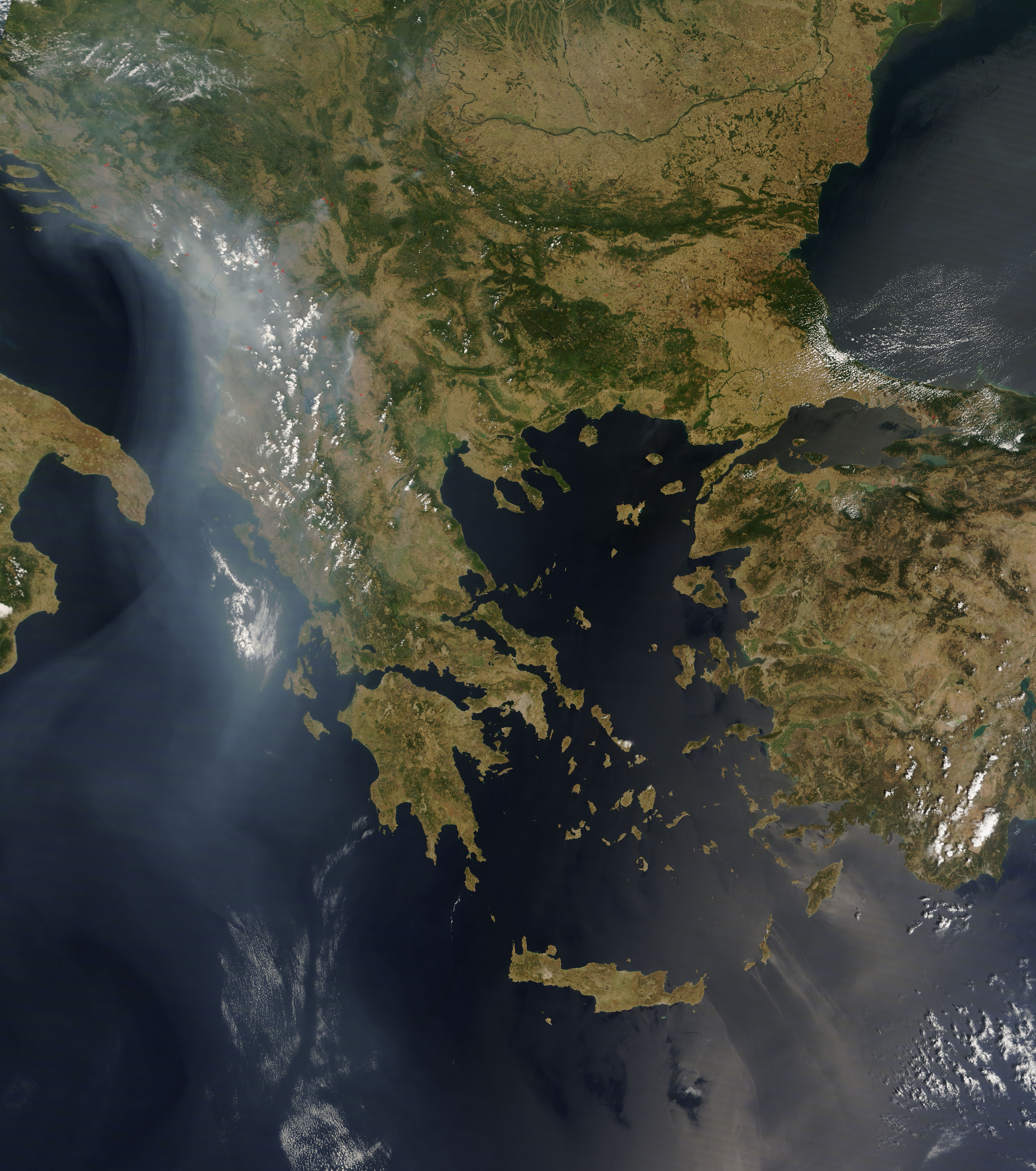
Satellite image of the Balkan Peninsula

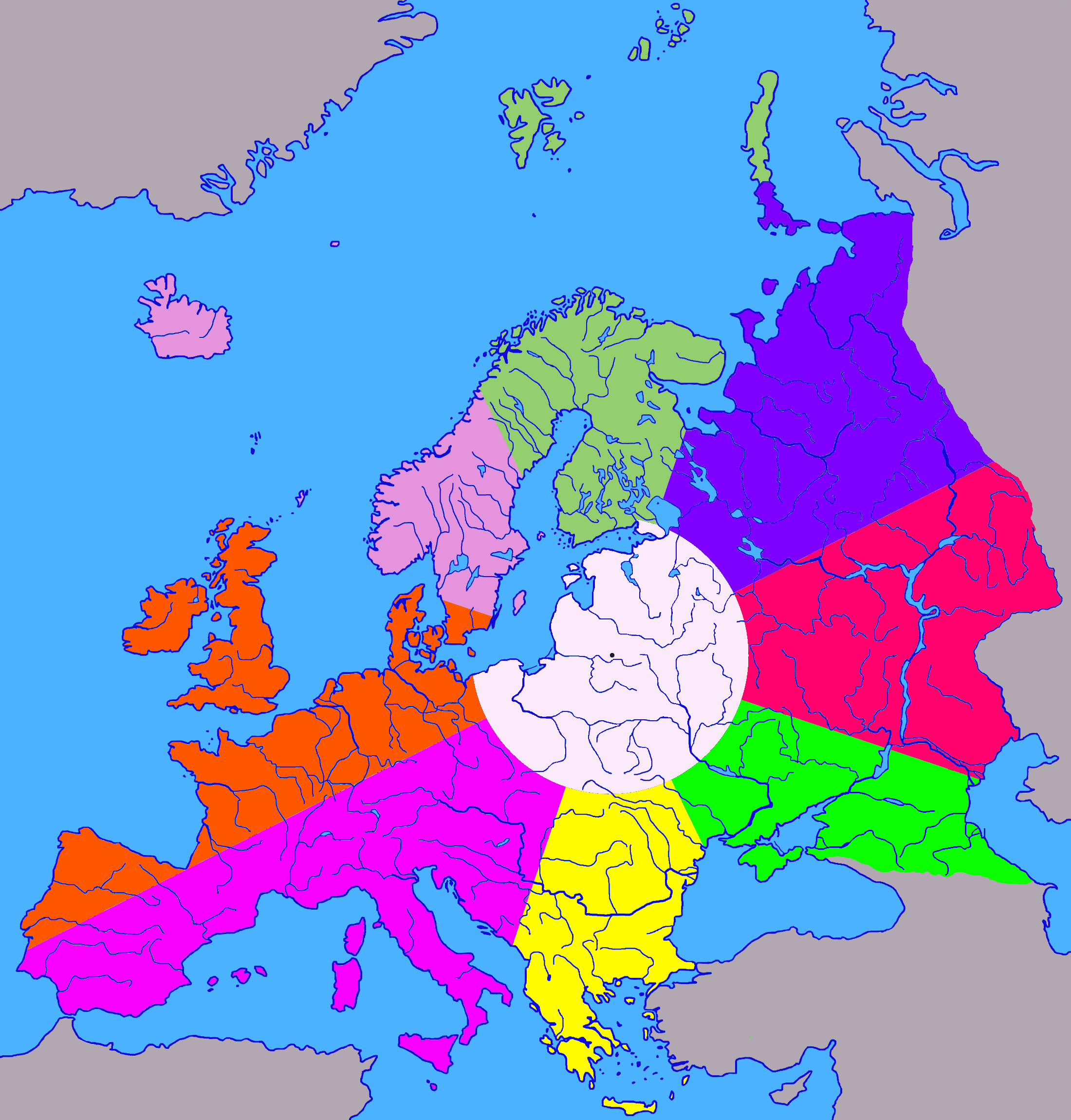
The division of Europe into the cardinal directions from the geographical midpoint of Europe in Lithuania. The south is yellow.

== Climate ==
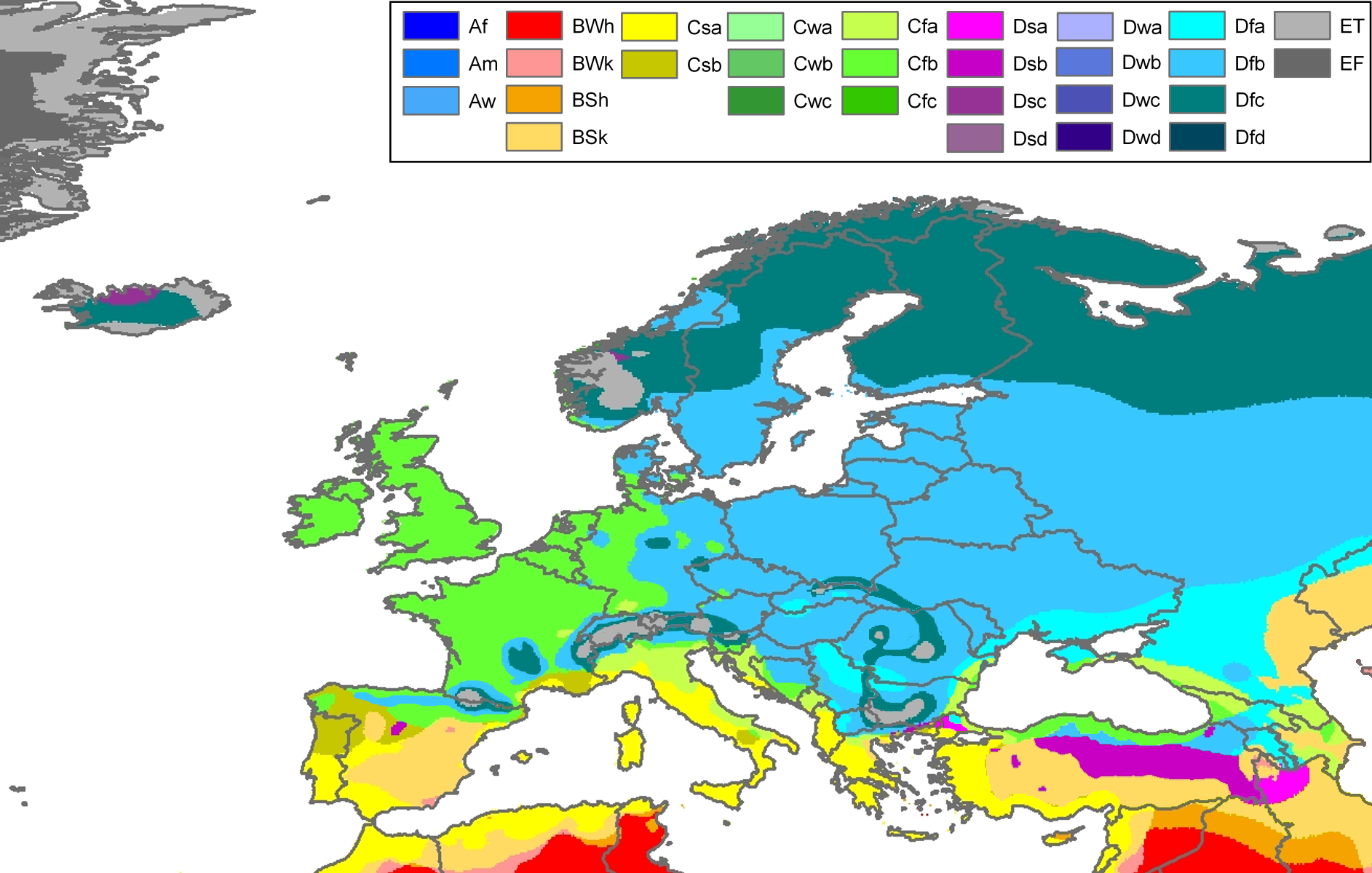
European climate. Note the high diversity of Köppen-Geiger climates in the southern regions.

Southern Europe's most emblematic climate is the Mediterranean climate, influenced by the large subtropical semi-permanent centre of high atmospheric pressure found, not in the Mediterranean itself, but in the Atlantic Ocean, the Azores High. The Mediterranean climate covers Portugal, Spain, Italy, the southern coast of France, coastal Croatia, coastal Slovenia, southern Bosnia and Herzegovina, Montenegro, Albania, and Greece, as well as the Mediterranean islands. Those areas of Mediterranean climate present similar vegetation and landscapes throughout, including dry hills, small plains, pine forests, and olive trees.

Cooler climates can be found in certain parts of southern European countries, for example, within the mountain ranges of Spain and Italy. Additionally, the north coast of Spain experiences a wetter Atlantic climate. In the highest regions of the Alps, which border southern Europe, even an ice cap climate can be found. (Note: The highest mountain of Italy is Mont Blanc (4,810 m))

Some parts of southern Europe have humid subtropical climates with warm and wet summers, unlike typical Mediterranean climates. This climate is mainly found in Italy and Croatia around the Adriatic Sea in cities such as Venice and Trieste, but also further north, near the Alpine foothills, in cities such as Como and Lugano.

The high mountains of the Alps and the Pyrenees act as a significant climatic barrier. An example is the Sirocco, a hot wind that originates in the heart of the Sahara and blows over Italy as far as the interior of the Alpine arc (the Po Valley), where it is prevented from spreading to the rest of Europe. Conversely, the Alps and the Pyrenees protect the Italian and Iberian peninsulas from the rain and icy winds coming from southern France, such as the Mistral and the Tramontane. When the Mistral and the Tramontane are blowing, they provoke an upwelling phenomenon along the French coast: surface waters are pushed offshore, allowing deeper, cooler waters to rise to the surface near the shore. Consequently, water temperatures along the French coast remain very cool even in summer and are not representative of the rest of the Mediterranean. This same kind of phenomenon takes place between the two slopes of the Balkan mountain range.

== Flora ==
Distribution map of Olea europaea s.l. (olive tree)

Southern Europe's flora is mainly characterized by Mediterranean forests, woodlands, and scrub, but also temperate broadleaf and mixed forests. The Mediterranean and Submediterranean climate regions in Europe are found in much of southern Europe, mainly Portugal, Spain, Italy, Malta, Albania, Greece, Cyprus and all the mediterranean islands, but also in southeast France and the Balkan Mediterranean coast.

In the Mediterranean coastal areas, olive groves, maquis shrubland, and steppes are very common. At higher elevations, or latitudes, they are replaced by chestnut and (often coppiced) mixed forests.

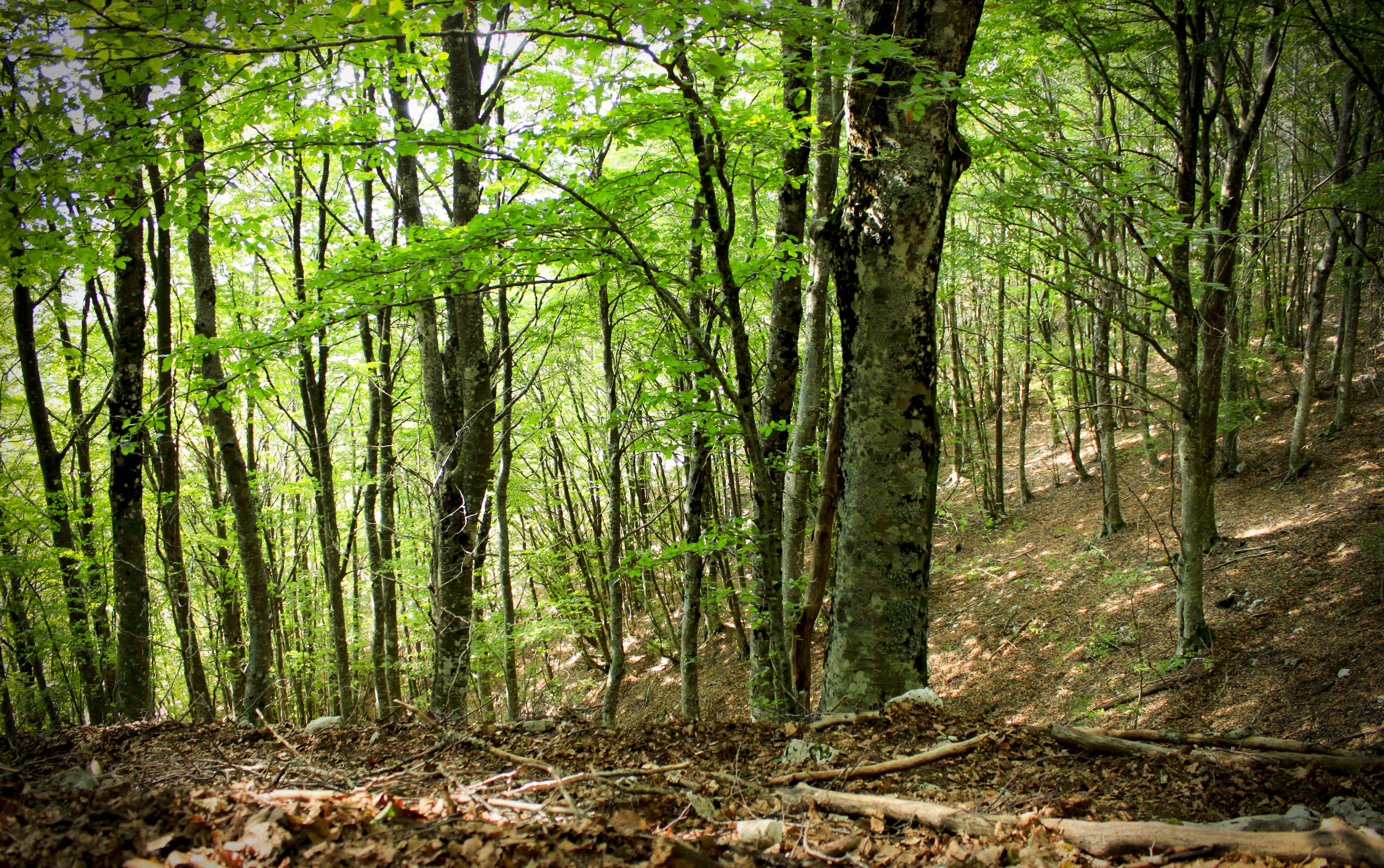
Beech forest in the Aurunci Mountains, Italy

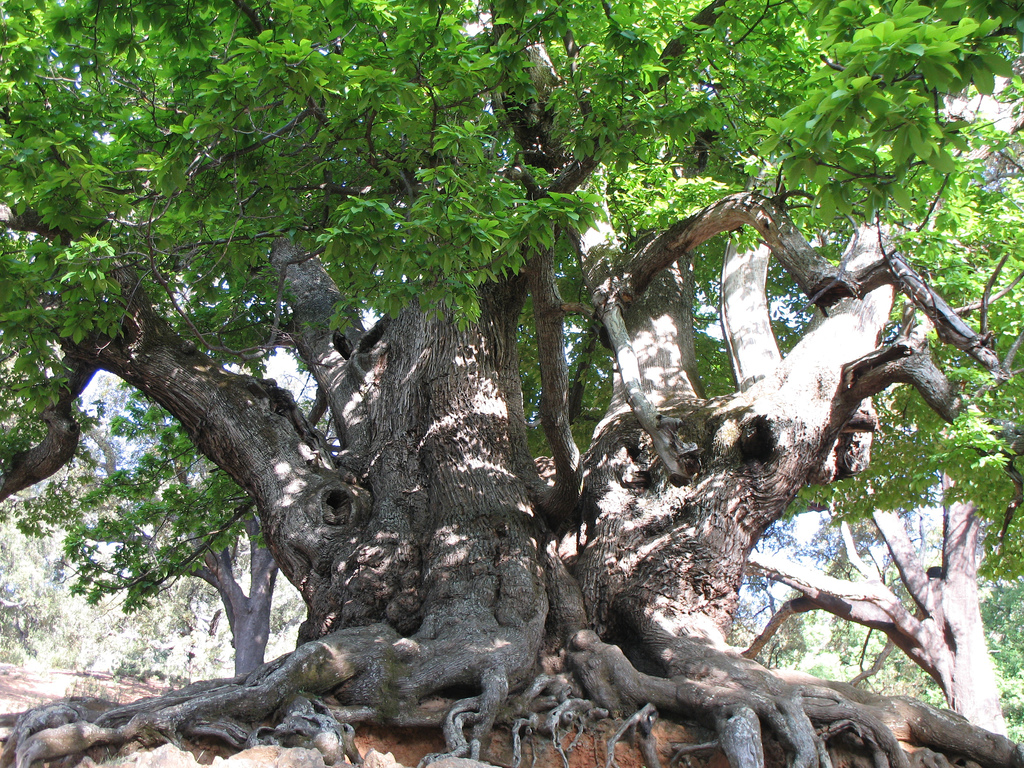
Sweet chestnut in the Sierra Real of Istán, Spain

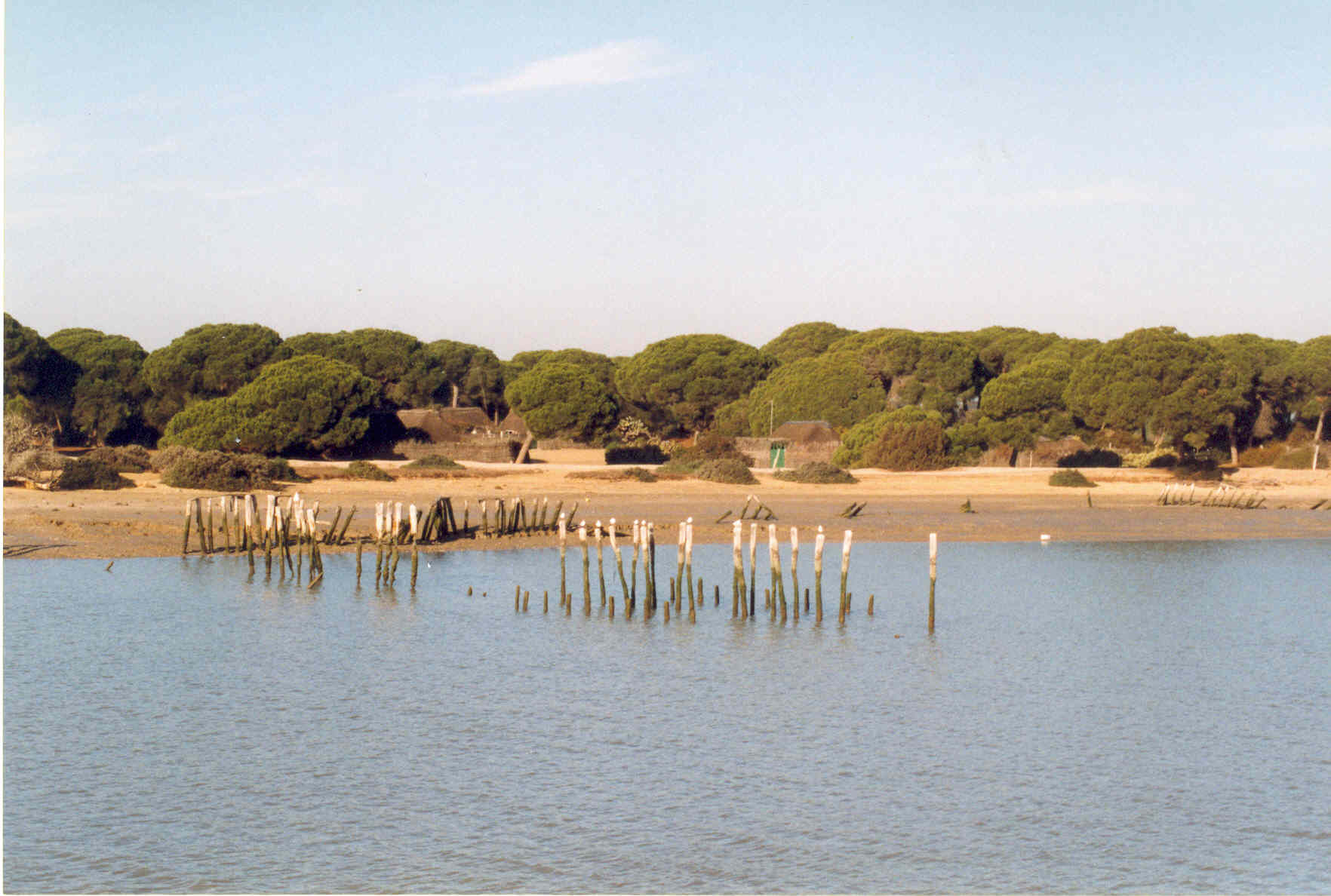
Stone pines in Doñana National Park, Spain

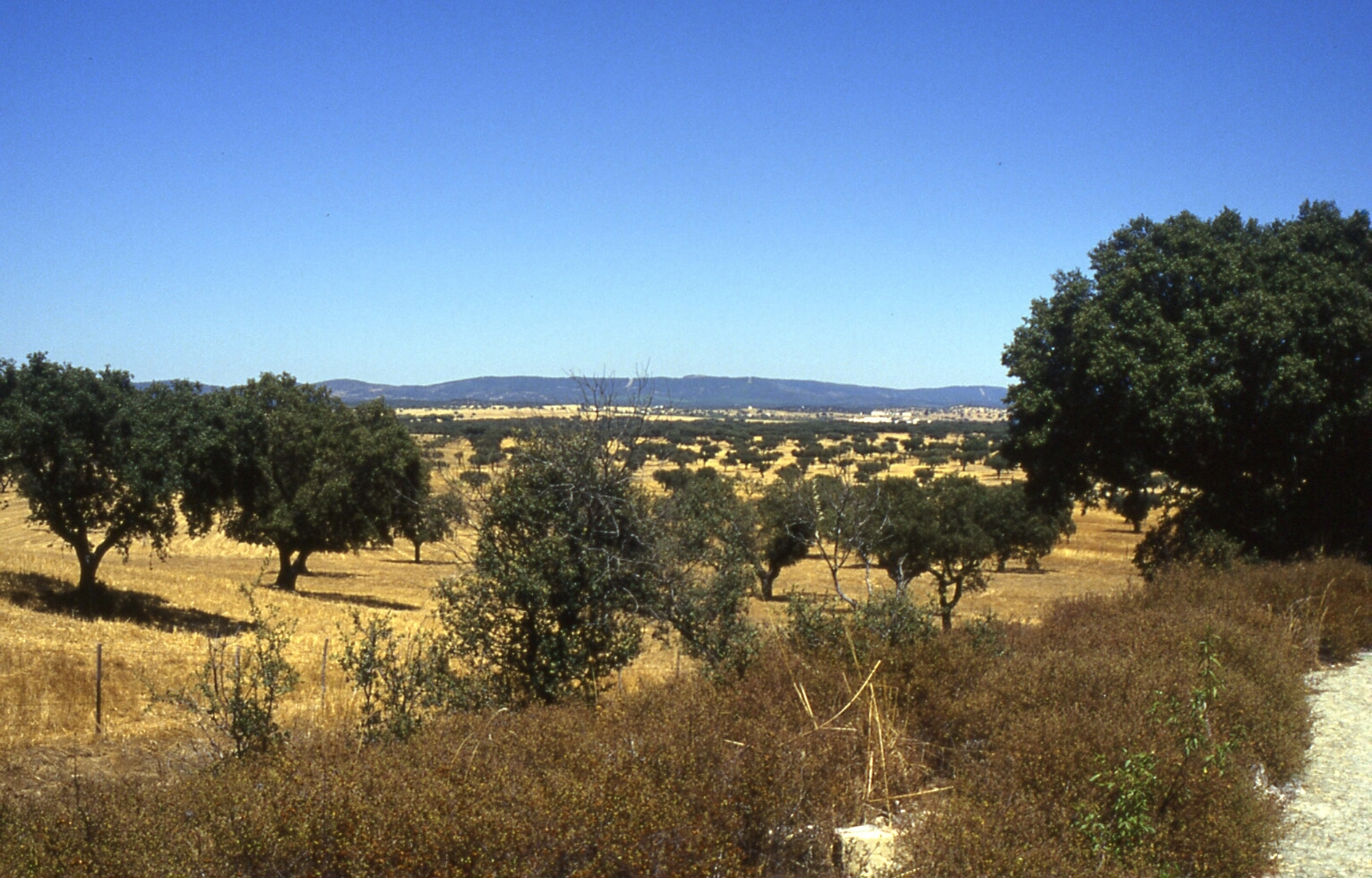
Oak savanna of Alentejo, Portugal (Q. suber and Q. rotundifolia)

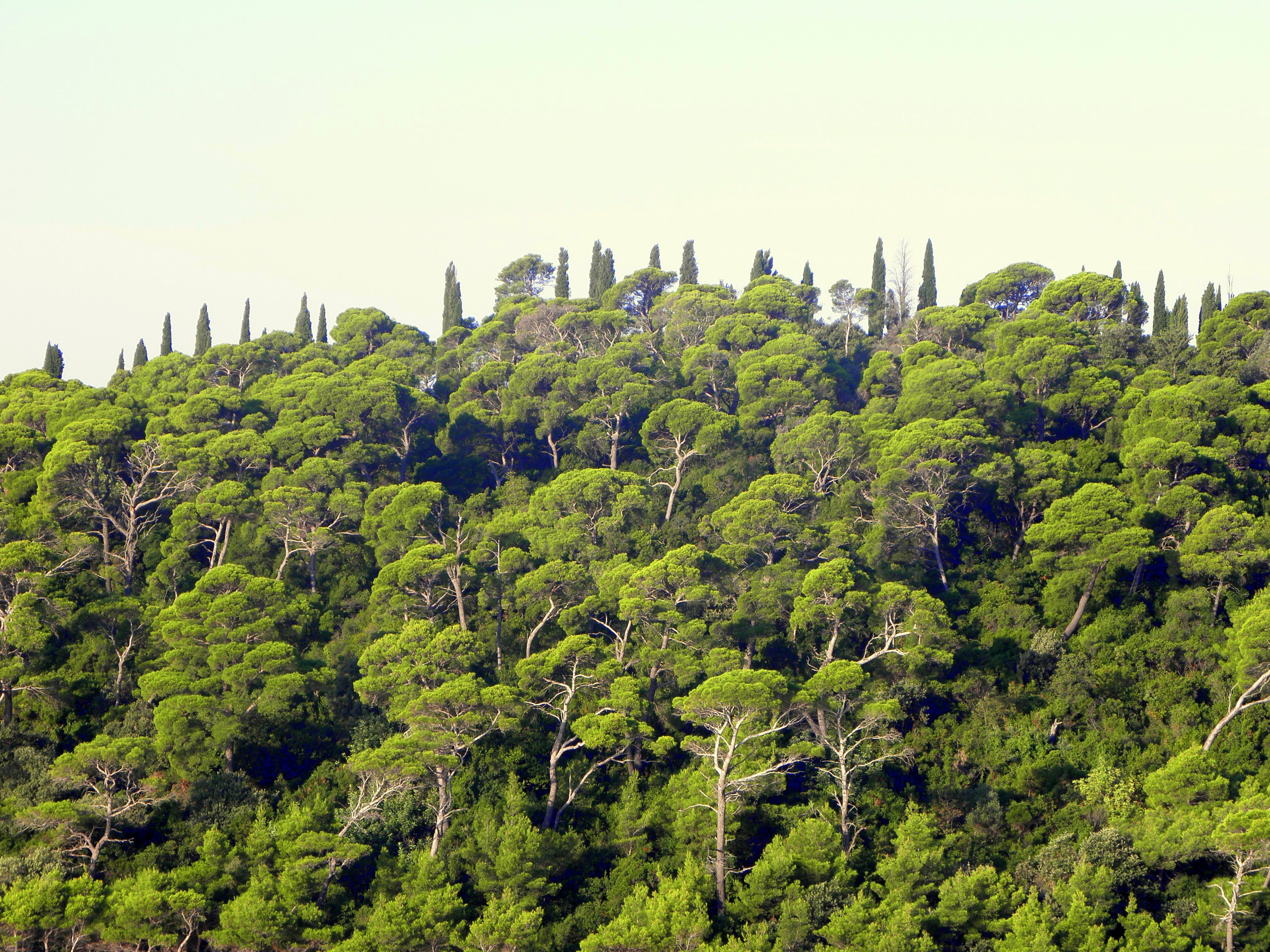
Aleppo pine forest, Croatia

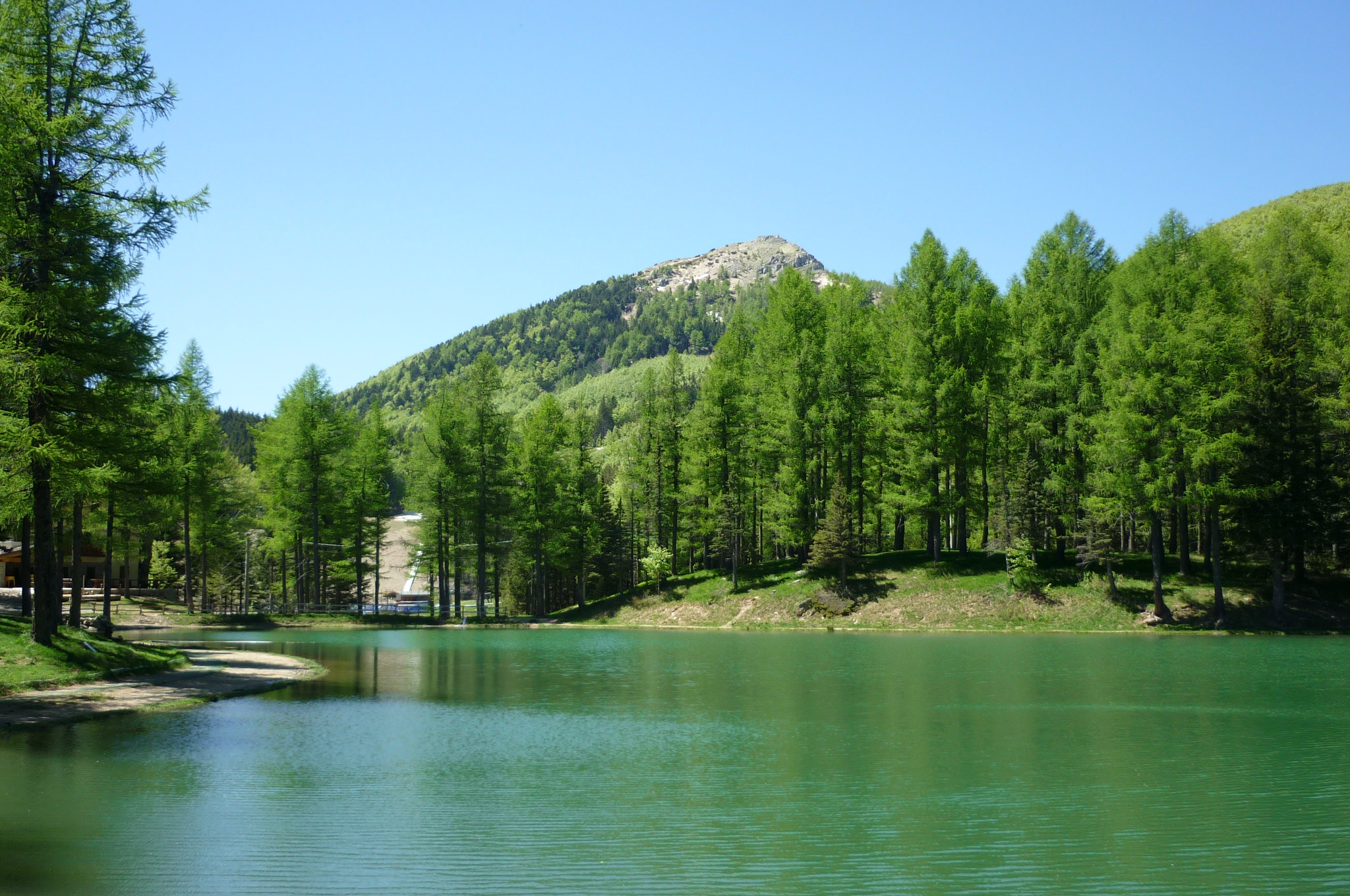
Temperate pine forests of Monte Cimone, Italy

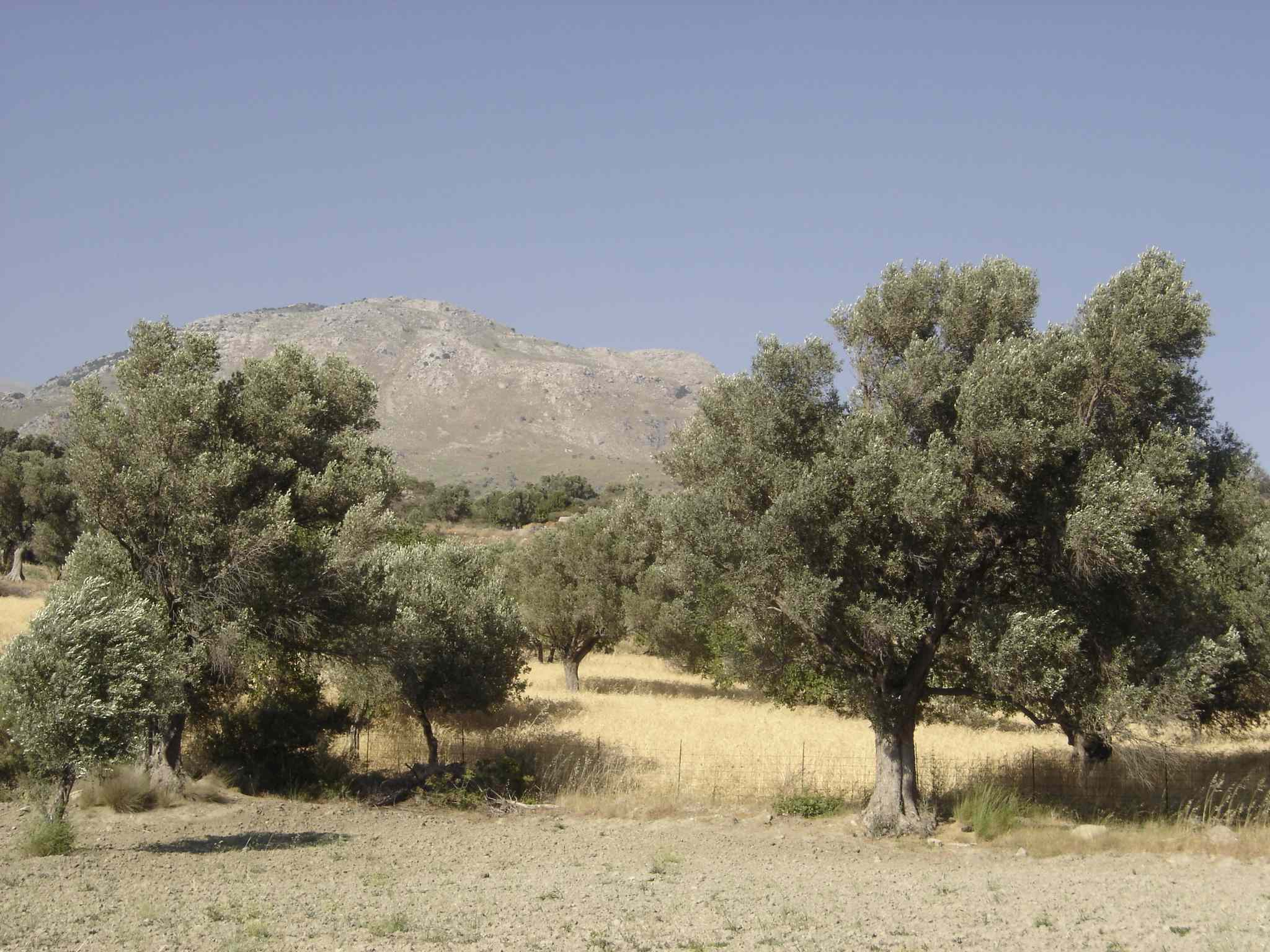
Dry olive groove, Crete

== History ==
=== Early history ===
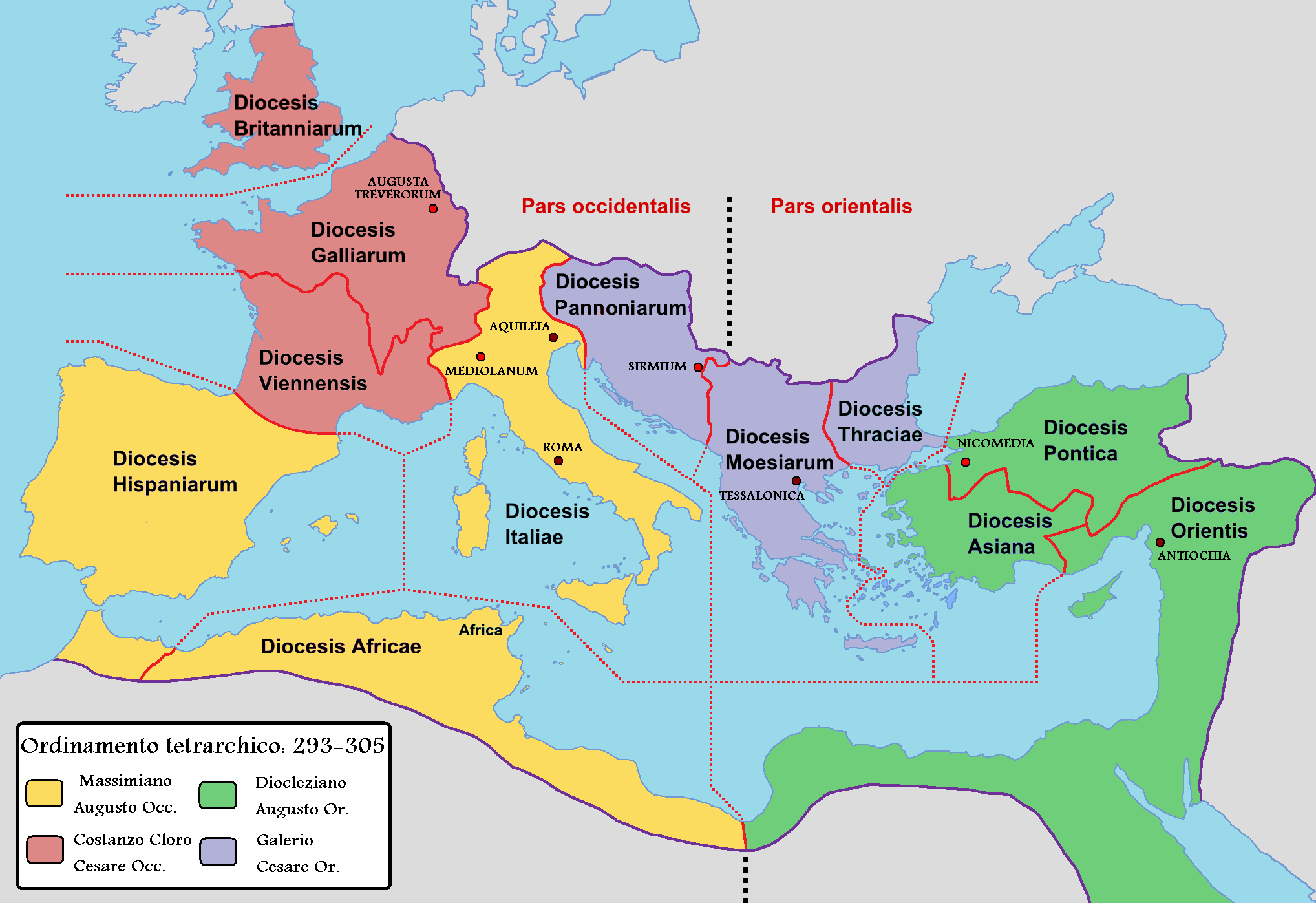
Roman Empire. In yellow the south-west of Europe, and in violet the south-east.

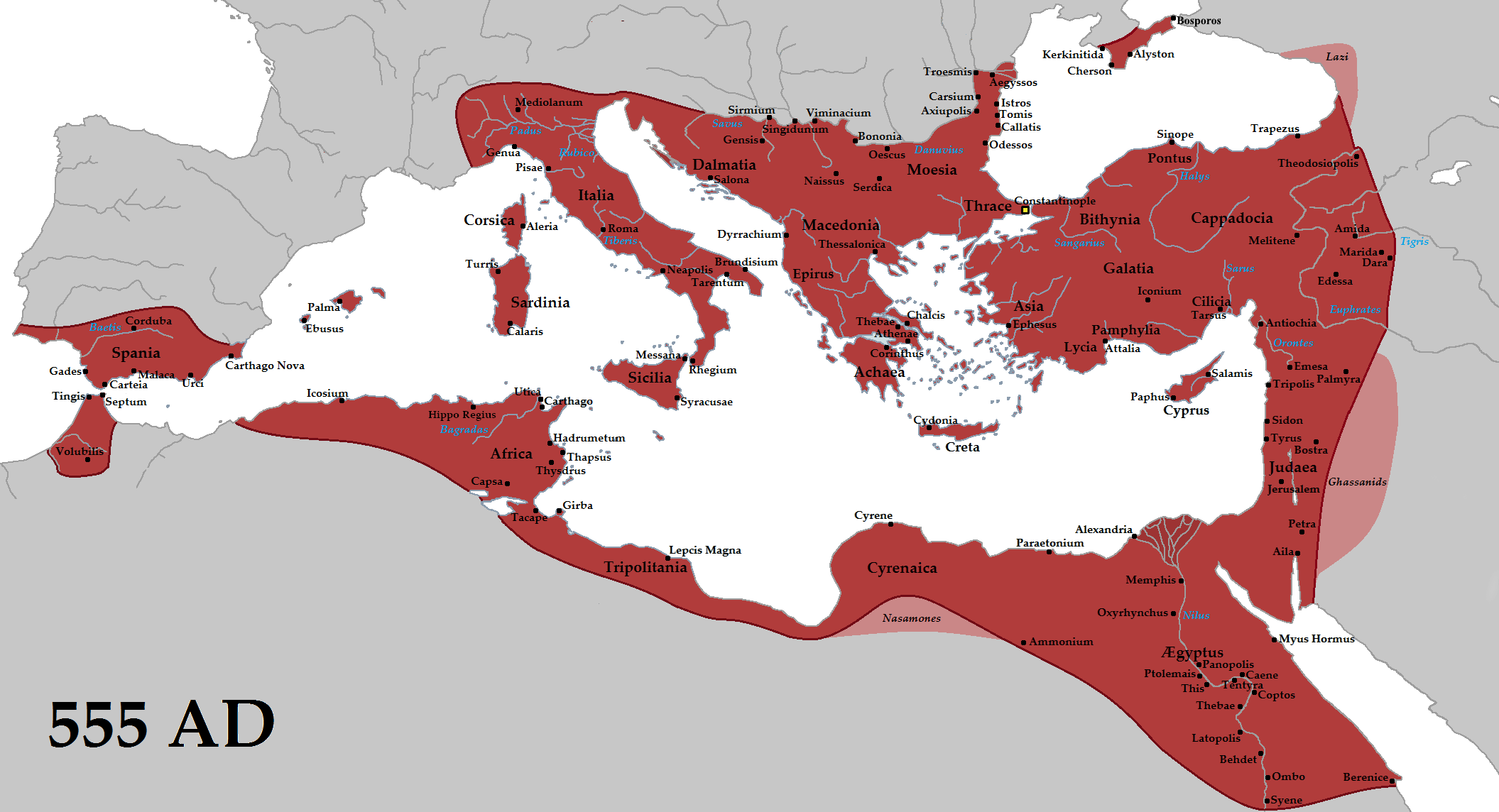
Eastern Roman Empire mainly focused on southern Europe

The Phoenicians originally expanded from Canaan ports, dominating trade in the Mediterranean by the 8th century BC. Carthage was founded in 814 BC, and the Carthaginians by 700 BC had firmly established strongholds in Sicily and Sardinia (both regions in present day Italy), which created conflicts of interest with Etruria. Its colonies later reached the Western Mediterranean, such as Cádiz in Spain and most notably Carthage in North Africa, and even the Atlantic Ocean. The civilisation spread across the Mediterranean between 1500 BC and 300 BC.

The period known as classical antiquity began with the rise of the city-states of Ancient Greece. Greek influence reached its zenith under the expansive empire of Alexander the Great, spreading throughout Asia. The Roman Empire came to dominate the entire Mediterranean Basin in a vast empire based on Roman law and Roman legions. It promoted trade, tolerance, and Greek culture. By 300 AD the Roman Empire was divided into the Western Roman Empire based in Rome, and the Eastern Roman Empire based in Constantinople. The attacks of the Goths led to the fall of the Western Roman Empire in 476 AD, a date that traditionally marks the end of the classical period and the start of the Middle Ages. During the Middle Ages, the Eastern Roman Empire survived though modern historians refer to the state as the Byzantine Empire. In Western Europe, Germanic peoples moved into positions of power in the remnants of the former Western Roman Empire and established kingdoms and empires of their own.

The period known as the Crusades, a series of religiously-motivated military expeditions originally intended to bring the Levant back into Christian rule, began. Several Crusader states were founded in the eastern Mediterranean, but they were all short-lived. The Crusaders would have a profound impact on many parts of Europe. Their sack of Constantinople in 1204 brought an abrupt end to the Byzantine Empire. Though it would later be re-established, it would never recover its former glory. The Crusaders would establish trade routes that would develop into the Silk Road and open the way for the merchant republics of Genoa and Venice to become major economic powers. The Reconquista, a related movement, worked to reconquer Iberia for Christendom. The late Middle Ages represented a period of upheaval in Europe. The epidemic known as the Black Death and an associated famine caused demographic catastrophe in Europe as the population plummeted. Dynastic struggles and wars of conquest kept many of the states of Europe at war for much of the period. In the Balkans, the Ottoman Empire, a Turkish state originating in Anatolia, encroached steadily on former Byzantine lands, culminating in the fall of Constantinople in 1453.

=== Post-Middle Ages ===
Beginning roughly in the 12th century in Florence, and later spreading through Europe with the development of the printing press, a Renaissance of knowledge challenged traditional doctrines in science and theology, with the Arabic texts and thought bringing about rediscovery of classical Greek and Roman knowledge. The Catholic reconquest of Portugal and Spain led to a series of oceanic explorations resulting in the Age of Discovery that established direct links with Africa, the Americas, and Asia. During this period, Iberian forces engaged in a worldwide struggle with Islamic societies; the battlefronts in this Ibero-Islamic World War stretched from the Mediterranean into the Indian Ocean, finally involving the islands of Southeast Asia (see also: Indo-Mediterranean). Eventually this ecumenical conflict ended when new players—England, Holland and France—replaced Spain and Portugal as the main agents of European imperialism in the mid-17th century.

European overseas expansion led to the rise of colonial empires, producing the Columbian Exchange. Most of the Americas inherited two of Southern Europe’s main languages: Spanish and Portuguese. The combination of resource inflows from the New World and the Industrial Revolution of Great Britain, allowed a new economy based on manufacturing instead of subsistence agriculture. The period between 1815 and 1871 saw a large number of revolutionary attempts and independence wars. Balkan nations began to regain independence from the Ottoman Empire. Italy unified into a nation state. The capture of Rome in 1870 ended the Papal temporal power.

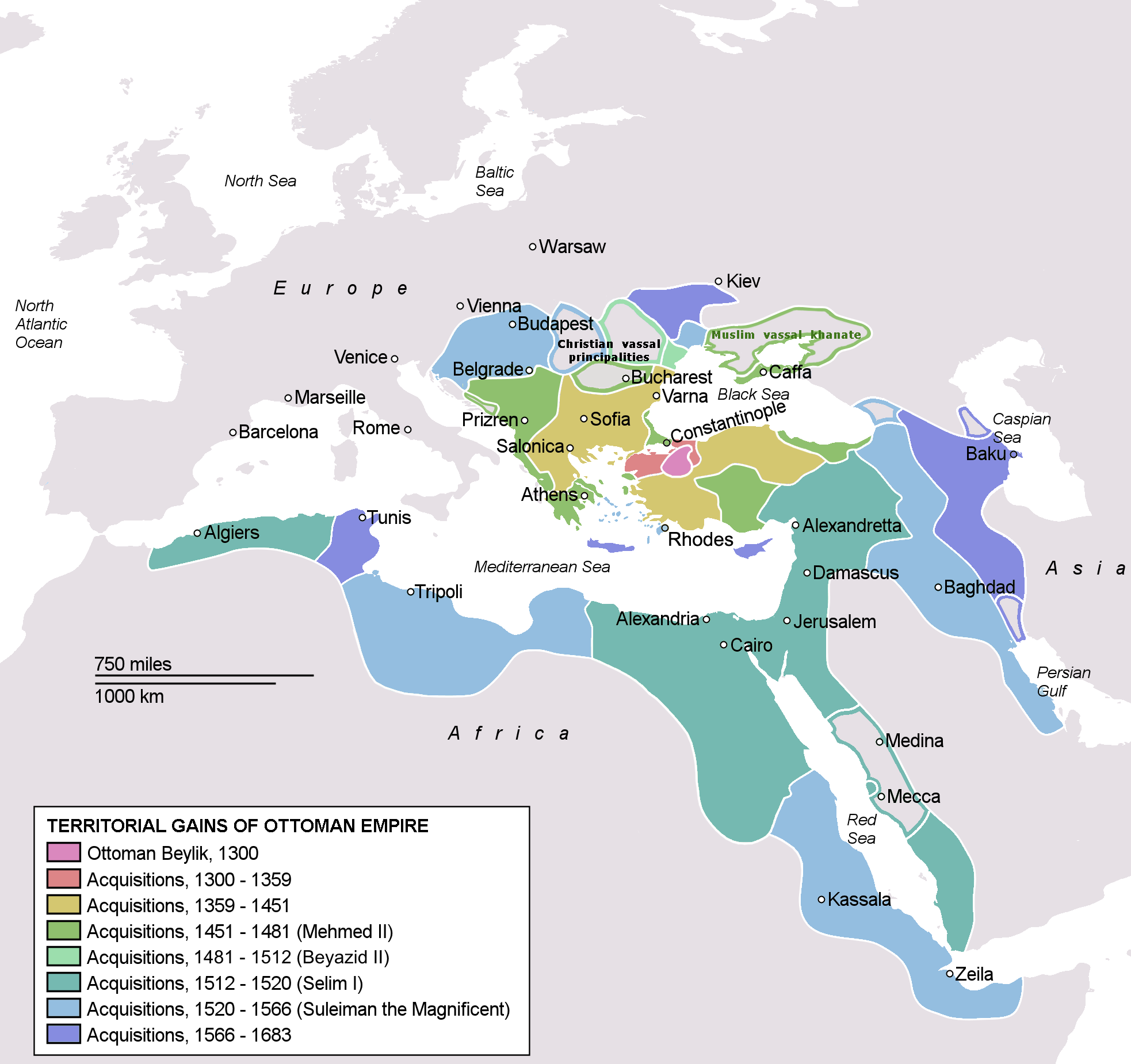
Ottomans controlled most of the Mediterranean Sea for centuries.

=== 19th to 21st century ===
Mountainous terrain and fragmented coastlines hindered Southern Europe’s industrialization. During the 19th century, countries such as Spain, Portugal, Italy, and Greece remained predominantly agrarian, with industrial growth concentrated in only a few urban regions (notably northern Italy and Catalonia). Political instability in the Iberian Peninsula and the Balkans, along with the influence of organized crime in Italy, further undermined economic development throughout much of the 20th century.

The outbreak of World War I in 1914 was precipitated by the rise of nationalism in Southeastern Europe as the Great Powers took up sides. The Allies defeated the Central Powers in 1918. During the Paris Peace Conference the Big Four imposed their terms in a series of treaties, especially the Treaty of Versailles. The Nazi regime under Adolf Hitler came to power in 1933, and along with Mussolini's Italy sought to gain control of the continent by the Second World War. Following the Allied victory in the Second World War, Europe was divided by the Iron Curtain. The countries in Eastern and Southeastern Europe were dominated by the Soviet Union and became communist states. The major non-communist southern European countries joined a US-led military alliance (NATO) and formed the European Economic Community amongst themselves. The countries in the Soviet sphere of influence joined the military alliance known as the Warsaw Pact and the economic bloc called Comecon. Yugoslavia was neutral. The common attribute of the eastern countries is that all of them have experiences with socialism, but nevertheless, the beginning of the 1990s was just roughly the same. For some of them becoming independent was the major challenge, while others needed to face with poverty and deep dictatorship also Economically, parallel with the political changes, and the democratic transition, – as a rule of law states – the previous command economies were transformed via the legislation into market economies, and set up or renewed the major macroeconomic factors: budgetary rules, national audit, national currency, central bank. Generally, they shortly encountered the following problems: high inflation, high unemployment, low economic growth and high government debt. By 2000 these economies were stabilized, and sooner or later between 2004 and 2013 some of them joined the European Union, and Slovenia introduced the euro.

Italy became a major industrialized country again because of its post-war economic miracle. The European Union (EU) involved the division of powers; tax, health and education handled by the nation states, and the EU had charge of market rules, competition, legal standards and environmentalism. The Soviet economic and political system collapsed, leading to the end of communism in the satellite countries in 1989 and the dissolution of the Soviet Union itself in 1991. The European Union expanded to subsequently include many of the formerly communist European countries – Romania and Bulgaria (2007) and Croatia (2013).

The Gotthard, a major and direct transport axis between northern and Southern Europe, was completed in 2016 with the Gotthard Base Tunnel. The Gotthard inscribes itself in a long history of transit across the Alps, which saw them progressively changing from an obstacle to a corridor between the North Sea and the Mediterranean Sea.

== Demographics ==
Population pyramid of southern Europe in 2023 (UN geoscheme classification)

=== Languages ===
==== Romance languages ====
The most widely spoken family of languages in southern Europe are the Romance languages, the heirs of Latin, which have spread from the Italian peninsula, and are emblematic of Southwestern Europe (See the Latin Arch.). By far the most common Romance languages in southern Europe are Italian (spoken by over 50 million people in Italy, southern Switzerland, Malta, San Marino, and Vatican City) and Spanish, which is spoken by over 40 million people in Spain, Andorra and Gibraltar. Other common Romance languages include Portuguese (spoken in Portugal), French (spoken in France, Monaco, and the Aosta Valley in Italy), Catalan (spoken in eastern Spain, Andorra, Southwestern France, and the Sardinian town of Alghero in Italy), Galician (spoken in northwestern Spain), Mirandese (spoken in northeast Portugal), and Occitan, which is spoken in the Val d'Aran in Catalonia, in the Occitan Valleys in Italy and in southern France.

==== Slavic languages ====
Slavic Languages are spoken in several countries on the Balkans. Bulgarian language (Български език) is spoken in Bulgaria (България). Bosnian-Serbian-Croatian is spoken in Kosovo, Croatia, Serbia, Bosnia, Montenegro, North Macedonia and Italy (in Molise). Slovenian is spoken in Slovenia, Italy (in Friuli-Venezia Giulia) and Croatia (in Istria) and Macedonian is spoken in North Macedonia.

==== Other languages ====
Albanian is spoken in Albania, Kosovo, North Macedonia, Montenegro, Greece, Serbia, Croatia and Italy (particularly by the Arbëreshë people in southern Italy).

The Hellenic languages or Greek language are widely spoken in Greece and Cyprus. Additionally, other varieties of Greek are spoken in small communities in parts of other European countries.

English is used as a second language in parts of southern Europe. As a primary language, however, English has only a small presence in southern Europe, in Gibraltar (alongside Spanish) and Malta (secondary to Maltese). English is also widely spoken in Cyprus.

There are other language groupings in southern Europe. Maltese is a Semitic language that is the official language of Malta, descended from Siculo-Arabic, but written in the Latin script with heavy Latin and Italian influences. The Basque language is spoken in the Basque Country, a region in northern Spain and southwestern France. Turkish is a Turkic language that is spoken in Turkey, Cyprus, Kosovo, Greece, North Macedonia and Bosnia, and German is spoken in Italy, particularly in South Tyrol.

=== Religion ===
The predominant religion in southern Europe is Christianity. Christianity spread throughout southern Europe during the Roman Empire, and Christianity was adopted as the official religion of the Roman Empire in the year 380 AD. The historic break of the Church into the western half, based in Rome, and the eastern half, based in Constantinople, has caused different denominations of Christianity to be prominent in different parts of Europe. Christians in the western half of southern Europe such as Portugal, Spain and Italy, are generally Roman Catholic. Christians in the eastern half of southern Europe such as Greece, Serbia and North Macedonia are generally Eastern Orthodox. Islam is widely practiced in Albania, Bosnia, Kosovo and Turkey and Northern Cyprus. Muslims are a significant minority in several countries of southern Europe such as Greece, Italy, Spain. Judaism was practiced widely throughout the European continent within the Roman Empire from the 2nd century.

== Classifications based on political borders ==
=== CIA World Factbook ===
Subregions of Europe based on the CIA World Factbook: Northern Europe Western Europe Central Europe Southwest Europe Southern Europe Southeast Europe Eastern Europe

In the CIA World Factbook, the description of each country includes information about "Location" under the heading "Geography", where the country is classified into a region. The following countries are included in their classification "southern Europe":

- Greece
- Holy See (Vatican City)
- Italy
- Malta
- San Marino

In addition, Andorra, Gibraltar, Portugal and Spain are classified as "Southwestern Europe", while Albania, Bosnia and Herzegovina, Bulgaria, Croatia, Kosovo, Montenegro, North Macedonia, Romania, Serbia and Turkey (the part west of the Bosporus) are described as located in "Southeastern Europe".

=== EuroVoc ===
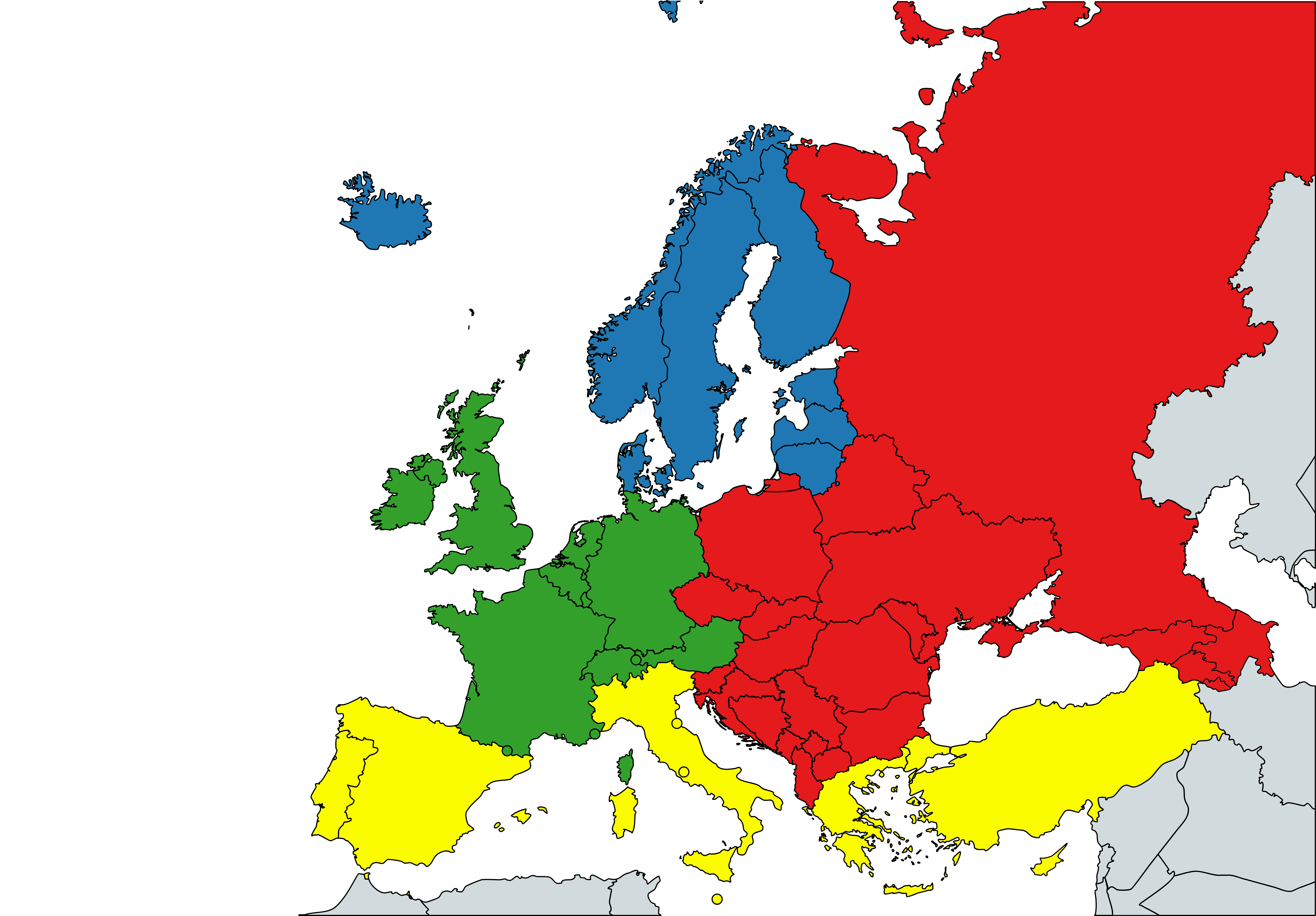
European regions according to EuroVoc: Northern Europe Western Europe Southern Europe Central and Eastern Europe

EuroVoc is a multilingual thesaurus maintained by the Publications Office of the European Union, giving definitions of terms for official use. In the definition of "southern Europe", the following countries are included:

- Cyprus
- Greece
- Holy See
- Italy
- Malta
- Portugal
- San Marino
- Spain
- Turkey

=== UN geoscheme classification ===
Subregions of Europe by the United Nations geoscheme: Eastern Europe Northern Europe Southern Europe Western Europe Transcaucasia

The United Nations geoscheme is a system devised by the United Nations Statistics Division (UNSD), which divides the countries of the world into regional and subregional groups, based on the M49 coding classification. The partition is for statistical convenience and does not imply any assumption regarding political or other affiliation of countries or territories.

In the UN geoscheme, the following countries are classified as southern Europe:

- Albania
- Andorra
- Bosnia and Herzegovina
- Croatia
- Greece
- Italy
- Malta
- Montenegro
- North Macedonia
- Portugal
- San Marino
- Serbia
- Slovenia
- Spain
- Vatican City

as well as the dependent territory:

- Gibraltar

=== European Travel Commission classification ===
European Travel Commission divides the European region on the basis of Tourism Decision Metrics (TDM) model. Countries which belong to the southern/Mediterranean Europe in this classification are:

Albania, Bosnia and Herzegovina, Croatia, Greece, Italy, Malta, Montenegro, North Macedonia, Portugal, Serbia, Slovenia, Spain and Turkey.

== See also ==
- Central and Eastern Europe
- Central Europe
- Eastern Europe
- EU Med Group
- EuroVoc#Southern Europe
- Mediterranean Basin
- Northern Europe
- Northwestern Europe
- Southeast Europe
- Western Europe
