= Punta de La Restinga =

Coordinates: 27°38′19″N 17°58′54″W

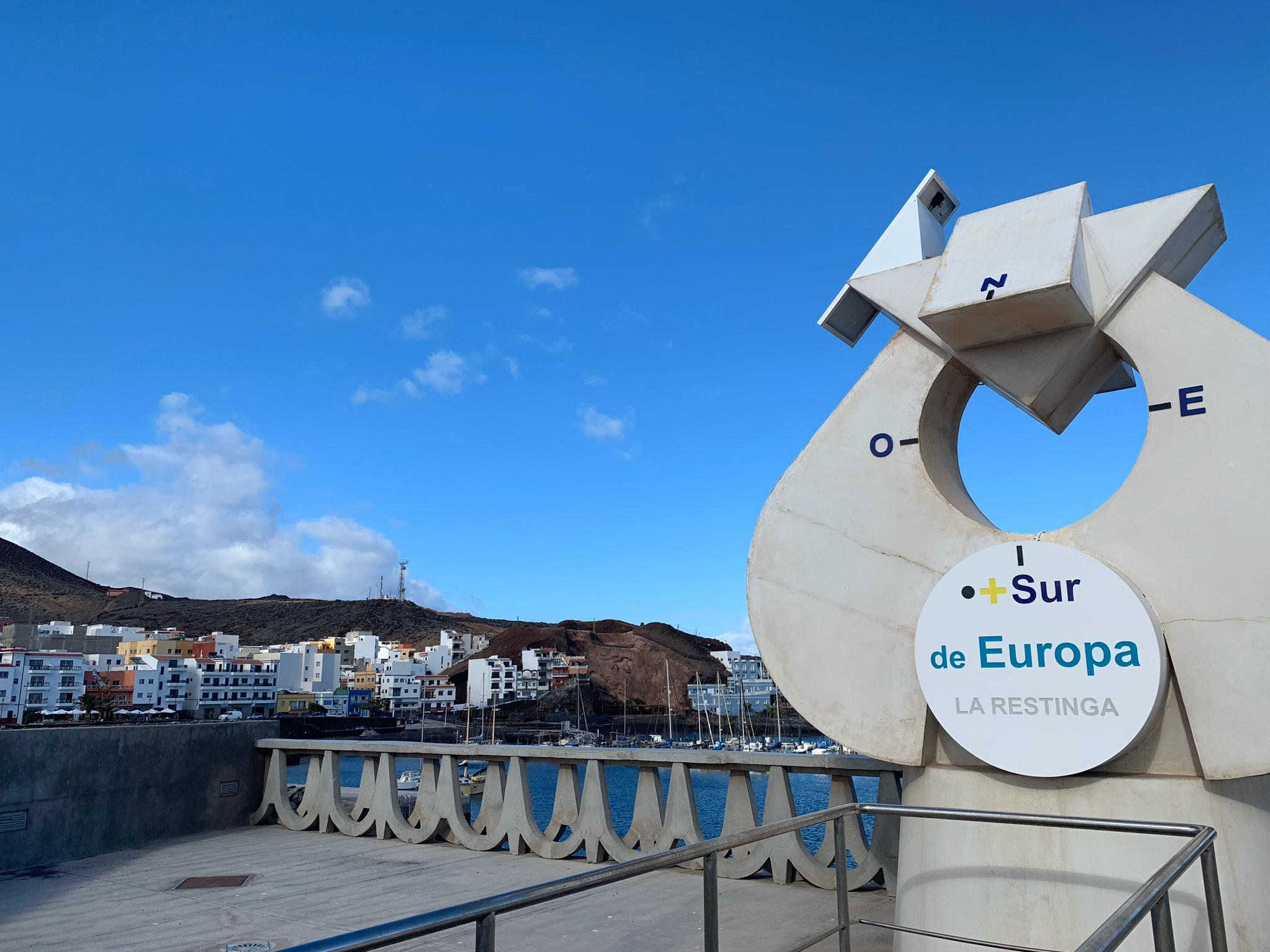
Monument denoting the southernmost point of Europe

Punta de la Restinga constitutes the southernmost point of Spain. It is located next to the town of La Restinga, in the municipality of El Pinar de El Hierro, island of El Hierro, autonomous community of Canary Islands.

Around the tip of La Restinga and the town of that name, the Mar de las Calmas is located there, where one of the best places for scuba diving in Spain and around the world is located, for the faunal wealth of its sea. The tip of the Restinga is the Marine Reserve of Punta de la Restinga.
