= Estaca de Bares Lighthouse =

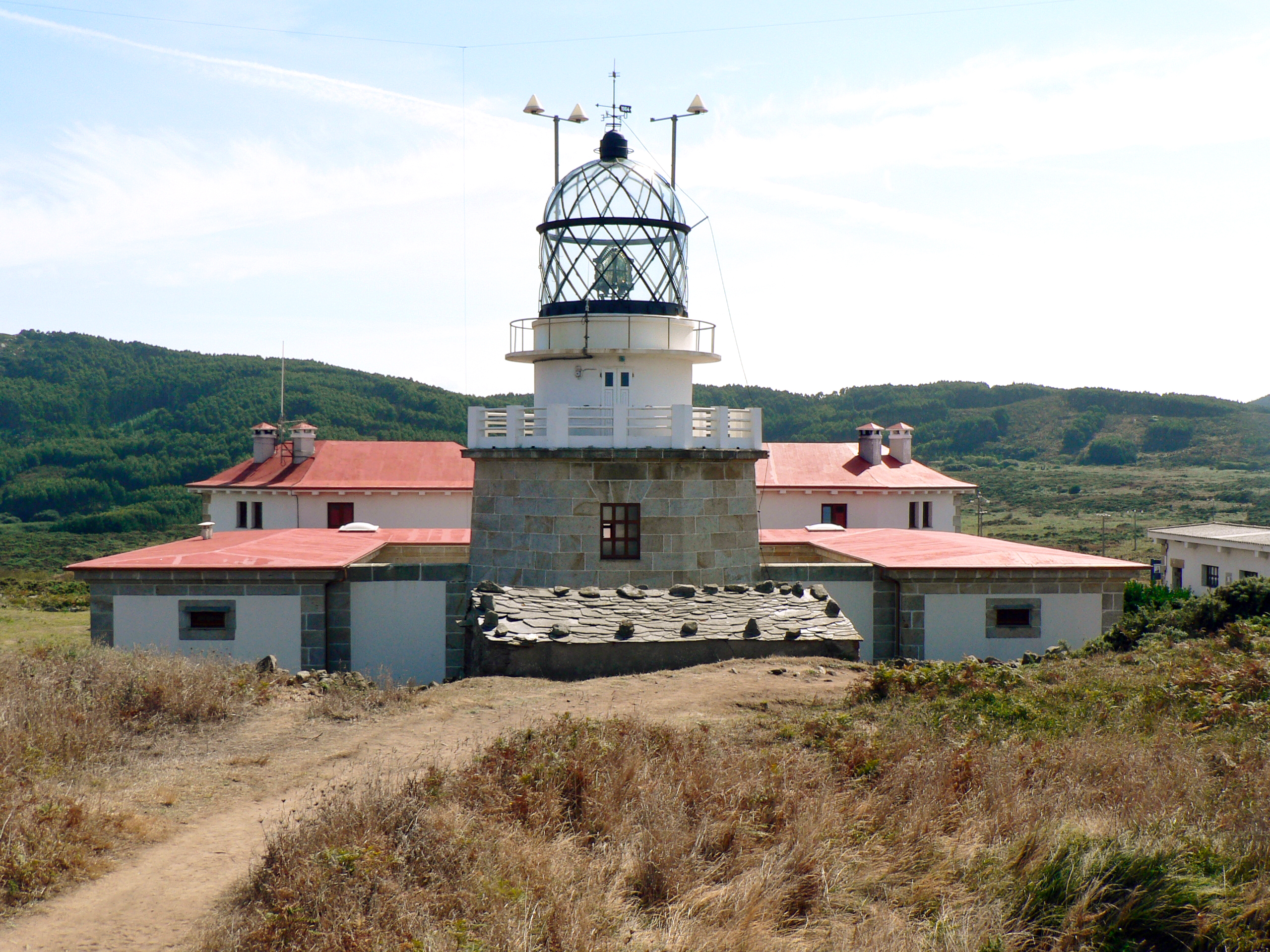
- Estaca de Bares Lighthouse
- Location: Estaca de Bares; Province of A Coruña; Galicia; Spain
- Coordinates: 43.786278°N 7.684347°W

Tower
- Constructed: 1850
- Construction: stone tower
- Height: 10 metres (33 ft)
- Shape: octagonal tower with double balcony and lantern
- Markings: unpainted tower, white balcony, full glass lantern
- Power source: mains electricity
- Operator: Autoridad Portuaria de Ferrol - San Cibrao

Light
- Focal height: 101 metres (331 ft)
- Range: 25 nautical miles (46 km; 29 mi)
- Characteristic: Fl (2) W 7.5s.
- Spain no.: ES-03100

Estaca de Bares Lighthouse (Spanish: Faro de Estaca de Bares) is an active 19th century lighthouse in Estaca de Bares in the Province of A Coruña, Galicia, Spain.

It was built in 1850, and has a 10-metre-high (33 ft) tower.

== See also ==
- List of lighthouses in Spain
