= Isla de Las Palomas =

Island opposite the port of Tarifa, Andalucia, Spain

Coordinates: 36°00′10″N 5°36′33″W

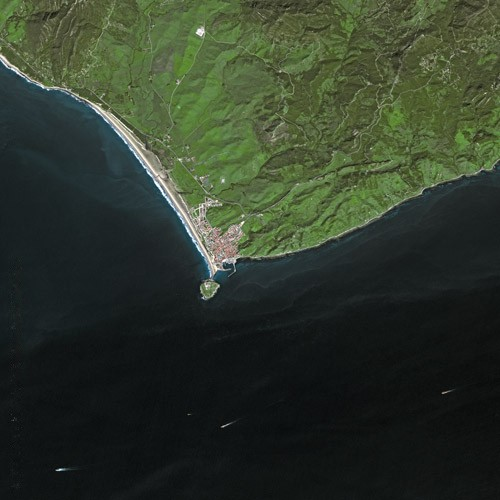
Aerial view of the Isla de Las Palomas

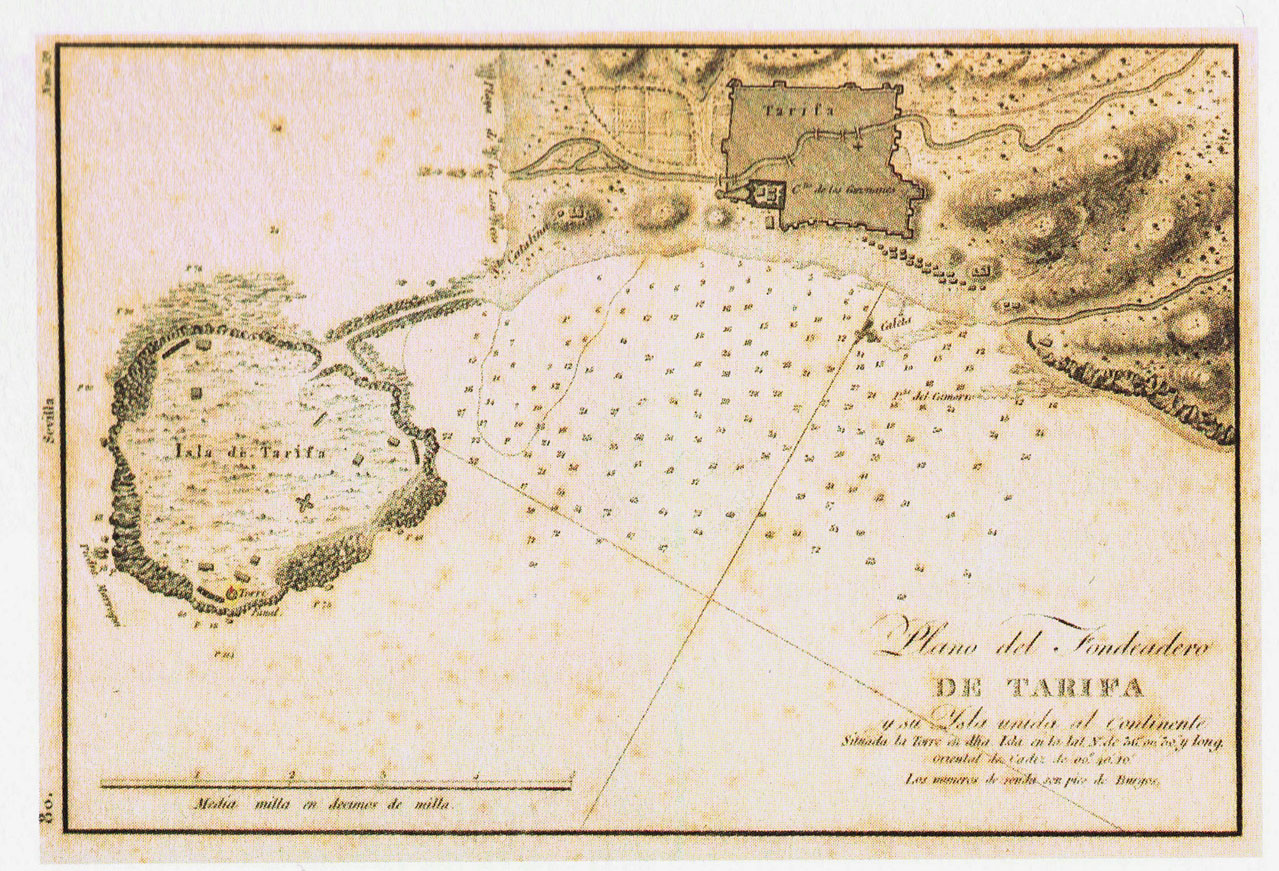
Map of 1813 showing Isla de Tarifa with causeway to the mainland

Isla de Las Palomas (lit. 'Pigeon Island') is an island opposite the town of Tarifa at the southern end of the Punta de Tarifa at the southernmost point of the Iberian Peninsula and continental Europe. The island has been connected to the mainland by causeway since 1808.
