= Punta de Estaca de Bares =

Coordinates: 43.789933°N 7.688112°W

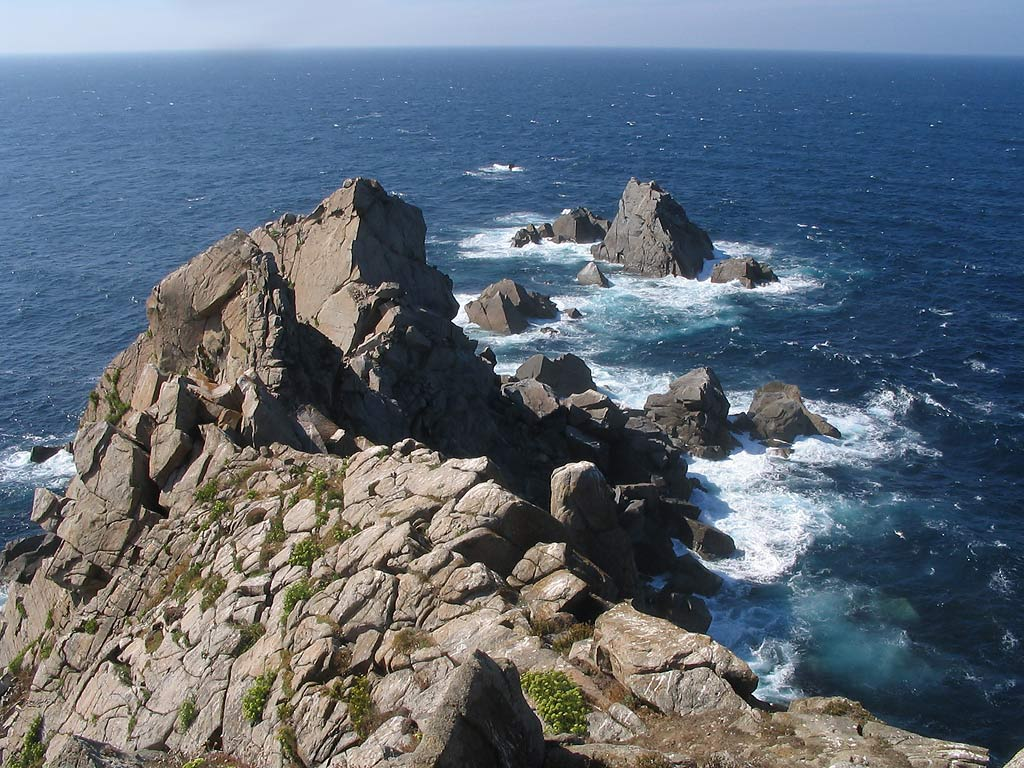
Estaca de Bares

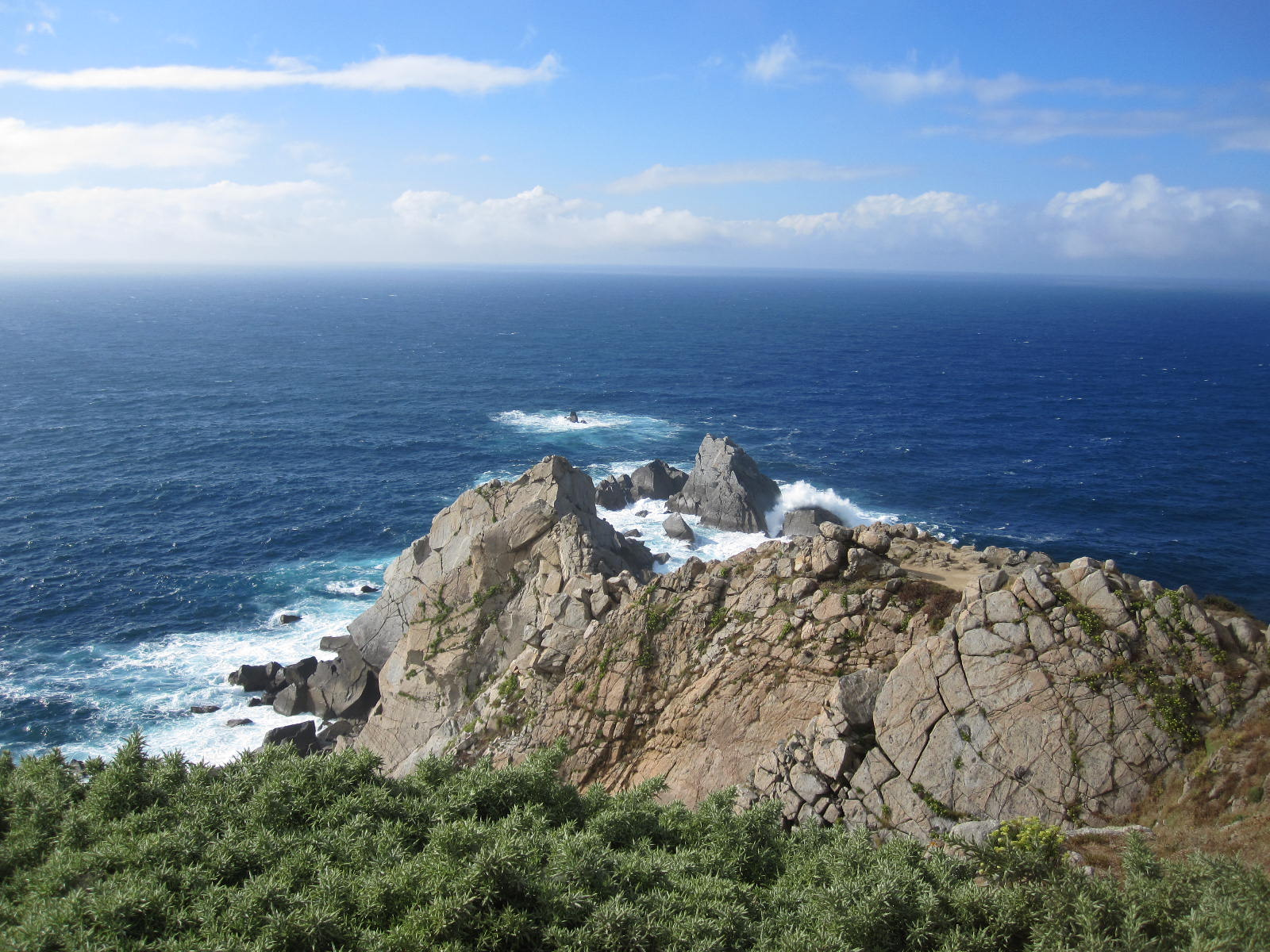
Estaca de Bares

Punta da Estaca de Bares is the northernmost point of Spain and the Iberian Peninsula, at a latitude of 43° 47′ 38″ North. It is located in Galicia.

The peninsula of Estaca de Bares penetrates considerably into the Cantabrian Sea, and as a result it is one of the rainiest places in Europe, with more than 2,500 mm a year (a Temperate rain forest). These special weather conditions have created over the centuries a unique ecosystem and biodiversity which have made it possible for this area to be declared an Area of National Natural Interest.

The history of Estaca de Bares Point is very rich. The ruins of the Phoenician Salt Fish Factory and the Phoenician Port are open to visitors. There is a lighthouse that was constructed in 1850 and still works to this day, under the administration of the Captain of the Port of Ferrol, Spain. There is also a bird sanctuary, ruins of molinas (grain mills) and abandoned military bases located here.

There is currently an abandoned military site there. It was first operated by the US Coast Guard beginning in the early 1960s as a LORAN (Long Range Aid to Navigation) Station. The station at Estaca de Bares operated jointly with stations operated by the British Government in East Blockhouse, Wales and, until 1973, the French Government in Pospoder, France. In 1978, after the Coast Guard ended the LORAN operations, the US Air Force assumed control of the base. The US Air Force 2186 Communications Squadron, headquartered at Torrejón Air Base near Madrid, operated the site as a remote Radio Relay Link (RRL) communications site until 1991, and it now sits in ruins. While the site was open, many Americans met and married local citizens.

There are also a series of waterways that used to power mills for the local citizens. These mills are located between the abandoned military base and the bird sanctuary.

The other site used to be an old signaling station used by the Spanish Navy. It has been converted into a hotel/restaurant.

During World War II a German submarine was sunk off the coast there. One of the German officers who survived the sinking returned every year thereafter to mark the anniversary. After his death he had his ashes scattered over Estaca de Bares.

== See also ==
- Extreme points of Spain
