= List of extreme points of Spain =

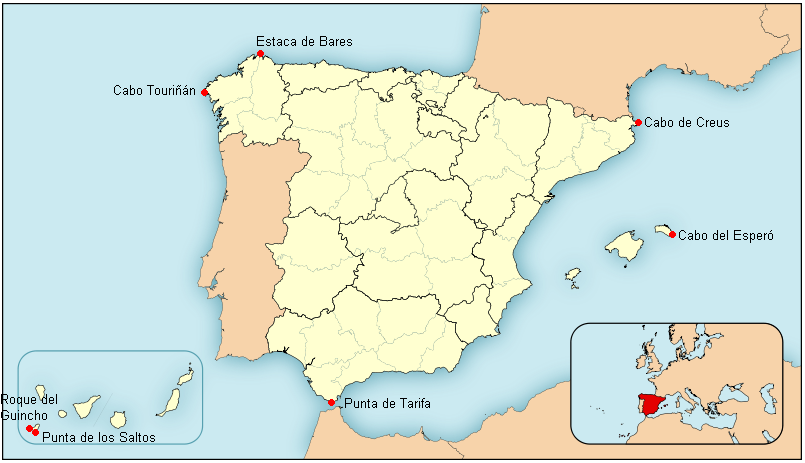
Map of the extreme points of Spain.

This is a list of the extreme points of Spain — the points that are farther north, south, east or west than any other location.

== Spain ==
- Northernmost Point — Punta de Estaca de Bares, Mañón, Corunna – 43°47′N 7°41′W
- Southernmost Point — Punta de La Restinga, El Pinar del Hierro, Santa Cruz de Tenerife – 27°38′N 17°59′W
- Westernmost Point — Punta de la Orchilla, Frontera, Santa Cruz de Tenerife – 27°43′N 18°09′W
- Easternmost Point — La Mola Island, Mahón, Balearic Islands at 39°52′N 4°19′E
- Highest Point — El Teide 3,718 m, Tenerife, Santa Cruz de Tenerife
- Point farthest from the coast (Iberian Pole of Inaccessibility) at Otero, Toledo 39.99°N 4.51°W

== Spanish mainland (geographic features) ==
- Northernmost Point — Punta de Estaca de Bares, Corunna at 43°47′N 7°41′W
- Southernmost Point — Punta de Tarifa, Cádiz at 36°00′N 5°36′W
- Westernmost Point — Cape Touriñán, Corunna at 43°02′N 9°18′W
- Easternmost Point — Cap de Creus, Girona at 42°19′10″N 3°19′19″E
- Center of the Península is reputedly assigned to Cerro de los Ángeles in Getafe (16 km south of Madrid) at 40°18′N 3°41′W
- Highest Point — Mulhacen 3,478 m, Sierra Nevada, Granada

== Spanish mainland (municipalities) ==
- Northernmost Municipality -- Ortigueira - 43°40′59″N 7°51′00″W
- Southernmost Municipality -- Tarifa - 36.014°N 5.606°W
- Westernmost Municipality -- Muxía - 43°6′17″N 9°13′5″W
- Easternmost Municipality- Cadaqués - 42.289°N 3.275°E

== Provincial capitals ==
- Northernmost: Santander at 43°28′N 3°48′W
- Southernmost: Las Palmas de Gran Canaria at 28°09′N 15°25′W
- Westernmost: Santa Cruz de Tenerife at 28°28′N 16°15′W
- Easternmost: Gerona at 41°59′N 2°49′E
- Highest: Ávila - 1,132 m (3,714 ft) at 40°39′N 04°41′W

== See also ==
- Geography of Spain
- Extreme points of Earth
