= Punta de Tarifa =

Southernmost point of Continental Europe

Coordinates: 36°00′15″N 5°36′37″W

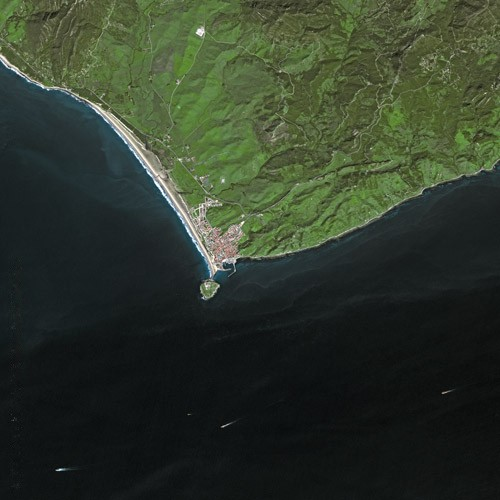
Punta de Tarifa from space

Punta de Tarifa (Tarifa Point) is the southernmost point of the Iberian Peninsula and Continental Europe. It is located in the province of Cádiz and the autonomous community of Andalusia on the Atlantic end of the Straits of Gibraltar. It is also sometimes referred to as Punta Marroquí (Moroccan Point), as the coast of Morocco can be seen from this point.

The point is the southeastern tip of the former island, known as Isla de Las Palomas, located offshore and now connected to the mainland by a causeway. The island had a military base between the 1930s and 2001.

The name of Tarifa, both for the island and for the municipality, originates from Tarif ibn Malik, who in 711 started here the Muslim conquest of the Iberian Peninsula.
