= Medcities =

MedCities is a network of Mediterranean cities created in Barcelona in 1991. It is much more than a network of 91 Mediterranean cities and metropolitan areas; it is a shared project for the future — a community that believes in the power of cooperation to protect our territories and improve people's lives.

MedCities is the meeting point where municipalities from the three shores of the Mediterranean connect, support one another, and learn together to face today's and tomorrow's challenges — from the climate crisis to the urban transformations needed to make cities sustainable and resilient.

The work focuses on four main areas: green and resilient cities (urban planning, energy, and water), waste management, coastal cities, and sustainable urban mobility.

Through innovative projects and a united voice, MedCities ensures that local priorities are heard by decision-making institutions — national, supranational, and European — and that each city has the resources and momentum to build a more resilient and cohesive Mediterranean.

Ultimately, MedCities is a commitment to future generations, driven by the conviction that, by working together, we can create real and lasting change. In short, we are the only forum for political cohesion across the three shores of the Mediterranean: indispensable today and always.

The goals of the network are to strengthen the environmental management capability of local administration, through decentralised activities involving technical assistance, and also to reinforce awareness of interdependence and common responsibility regarding the policies of urban environmental conservation in the Mediterranean basin.

From 2017 MedCities acts as an independent association.

== History ==
The creation of MedCities was a consequence of METAP's objective of strengthening decentralised actions involving technical assistance as the best means of promoting awareness of urban environmental problems and making those actions into a vehicle for empowering municipalities in developing countries in respect of management of urban environmental issues. MedCities continues offering this support. Afterwards, MedCities has extended its activities from the initial local environment to the wider local sustainable development field, focusing on cities strategic planning, urban resilience, environmental and biodiversity, social cohesion, or economic development projects .

== Objectives ==
The MedCities network is a tool to strengthen the environmental and sustainable development management capability of local administration, but it is also useful in order to identify the domains where a common activation could be the most useful means to improve the regional environmental conditions. The goals of the MedCities Network are the following:

- to reinforce the awareness of interdependence and common responsibility regarding the policies of urban environmental conservation in the Mediterranean basin;

- to strengthen the role and the means (institutional, financial and technical capability) of municipalities in the implementation of local sustainable development policies;

- to develop awareness and involvement of citizens and consumers on urban sustainable development;

- to set up a direct cooperation policy in order to implement the partnership between coastal Mediterranean cities.

All the activities and projects MedCities carries on are based on the United Nations 2030 Agenda for Sustainable Development (Sustainable Development Goals or SDG). The Mediterranean network defines itself as the SDG 17, Global Partnership for Sustainable Development as MedCities works with other organizations and key stakeholders.

== Members ==
The network originally comprised one city in each country, with a preference for cities other than the capital. Then an accord was subsequently reached expanding possible membership to two cities per country. After the celebration of the General Assembly 2025 -held in Barcelona- and the latest members approved, these are the 91 city members, from 17 countries:

- Agadir
- Agia Paraskevi,
- Urban Community of Al Fayhaa
- Al Mirad
- Al Karak
- Al Hoceima
- Al Qamishli
- Ancona
- Antalya
- Municipality of Greater As-Salt
- Azraq
- Bab Amman
- Baddawi
- Bani Obeid
- Barcelona
- Barcelona Metropolitan Area (AMB)
- Batroun
- Union of Municipalities of Batroun
- Bethlehem
- Biograd Na Moru
- Bizerte
- Bodrum
- Bonifacio
- Union of Municipalities of Dannieh
- Deir Alla
- Djerba Midoun
- Durrës
- Dubrovnik
- El Mina
- Ein-el-Basha
- Eskişehir Metropolitan Municipality
- Gabès
- Gaza
- Gaziantep
- Genova
- Girona
- Glyfada
- Federation of Municipalities of Higher Chouf
- Metropolitan Municipality of Hatay
- Municipality of Greater Irbid
- Metropolitan Municipality of Izmir
- Jbeil ( Byblos)
- Municipality of Greater Jerash
- Union of Municipalities of Jezzine
- Jounieh
- Kairouan
- Union of Municipalities of Koura
- Kerkennah,
- Kotor
- Larnaka
- Lemesos (Limassol)
- Municipality of Greater Madaba
- Mahdia
- Málaga
- Marseille
- Menzil Bourghiba
- Mersin
- Minieh
- Monastir
- Montpellier (Montpelhièr)
- M'Saken
- Metropolitan Municipality of Muğla,
- Nabeul
- Nablus
- Napoli
- Città Metropolitana di Napoli
- Palma
- Piraeus
- Grad Pula - Pola
- Qalamoun
- Ramallah
- Rethymno
- Roma
- Roskovec
- Saida
- Sarajevo
- Sarafand
- Sfax
- Sidi Bou Said
- Sousse
- Tanger
- Tataouine
- Tétouan
- Tirana
- Tripoli
- Tripoli (Libya)
- Tunis
- Um al Basateen
- València
- Zahle
- Municipality of Greater Zarqa
- Zgharta-Ehden

MedCities also has the following observing members: The Catalan Agency for Development Cooperation (ACCD), the Mediterranean Citizens' Assembly Foundation (FACM), the Provincial Council of Barcelona (Diputació de Barcelona), ANIMA Invest Network, Hariri Foundation, MEDPAN, the Parliamentary Assembly of the Mediterranean, and the European Institute of the Mediterranean (IEMed).

== Organisation ==
General Assembly: it is the supreme body of the Association, and it is composed of all its members. It must be convened at least one every three years, and it gives a ruling on the items on the agenda proposed by the board, and on various others issues. It elects the President and the members of the Board.

Board: the Association is governed by a Board of 5 to 9 members: the President, the Secretary General and from three to seven members. It meets at least once a year.

Presidency: the President represents the Association in all acts of civil life, and he is invested with all the powers to this effect. The mandate of the President covers the period from one General Assembly to the other. The Presidency has been held by Barcelona, Marseille, Tangier, Limassol, Rome and Tétouan. The current President of MedCities is Montpellier, represented by Mr. Michaël Delafosse, Mayor of Montpellier.

General Secretariat: it is an administrative body which helps the Association's president and Board in their respective tasks. It is managed by a General Secretary and it takes care of the management of the network, identifying the needs of the cities, representing the Medcities network in international events (together with member cities), ensuring technical and financial coordination, the preparation and follow-up of field projects, the organisation of the General Assembly and the Board's meetings and the publishing of presentation material. The General Secretariat has a four-years mandate, and may be re-elected.

The MedCities Board of Directors for the period 2023-2026 was approved by the members at the Extraordinary General Meeting held online, on 31 January 2023. The composition of the current Board is as follows:

- Municipality of Montpellier (President)
- Union of Municipalities of Dannieh (Vice-president)
- Municipality of Tunis (Vice-president)
- Barcelona Metropolitan Area (Secretary)
- Municipality of Tétouan (Treasurer)
- Municipality of Limassol (Member)
- Municipality of València (Member)
- Zarqa Greater Municipality (Member)
- Municipality of Bethlehem (Member)

Updated information can be found here.

== Network activities ==
=== Institutional activities ===
MedCities is a tool that reinforces the environmental management capacity of local administrations. The network identifies areas where joint actions could contribute to improve regional environmental conditions. A key objective of Medcities is promoting sustainable urban development as a general policy in the Mediterranean. To this effect, it participates in the Nations Mediterranean Action Plan, and it is also a member of the Commission on Sustainable Development in the Local Government Area. Medcities is also a member of the steering committee for the European Sustainable Cities and Towns Campaign and of the Mediterranean Working Group of the Union of Cities and Local Governments.

=== Operational activities ===
MedCities can develop its activities and projects thanks to the member fees as well as funding for specific projects and thought European-funded prorgammes or southren agencies which help to pursue and accomplish the priorities that have been identified. In all projects, the network set activities meant to transfer knowledge and to train technical staff from city councils. Seminars, on-site visits by technicians, training manuals, presentations or the publication and presentation of final recommendations are also core activities. Medcities publishes the most relevant activities and terms of reference in the social media accounts (X, Linkedin, Facebook, Youtube) and send a newsletter providing information on actions taken by the different cities and the network's own activities. The results of some own or third-party projects and the publication of good practices, tools, or interviews with relevant people can be found on the MedUrbanTools website, managed by MedCities. MedUrbanTools is one of the 13 flagships initiatives of UNEPMAP, from which MedCities is part of.

== Areas of intervention ==
- Governance, institutional support, local finances;
- Urban planning and development;
- Biodiversity and Environment and risk management (waste management, urban soft mobility, water management, WEFE Nexus approach...).

== Projects realised ==
- “Urban air quality improvement through air quality and mobility plan and the institutional strengthens of local administration on air quality”, with the participation of Barcelona, Larnaca, Limassol, Tetouan and Al Fayhaa.
- “Urban mobility plan” in Sousse
- A'SIMA TUNIS (Strategic planning from Tunis City)
- MELUP (Gender perspective in urban planning in Al Hoceima and Tripoli)
- NATURINCMED (Design of green and socially inclusive public spaces in southerm Mediterranean municipalities)
- “Regional solid waste management” in Mashriq and Maghreb countries.
- “Local Sustainable Development Networking" project.
- “ICZM – Integrated Coastal Zone Management” project, co-financed by the EU SMAP programme.
