= Latin Arch =

Latin Arch or Latin Arc (French, Occitan: Arc latin; Catalan: Arc Llatí; Italian, Spanish, Portuguese, Galician: Arco Latino) is a name coined for the littoral around the northwestern Mediterranean Basin, which stretches from the bottom of the Italian Peninsula at Malta, along the eastern coast of Sicily, the west Italian coast, Southern France, the eastern Spanish coast, finishing at Gibraltar, encapsulating the Balearic Islands, Corsica, and Sardinia.

This forms the shape of an arch, and seen as the core of Latin Europe.

== Arco Latino (Organization) ==
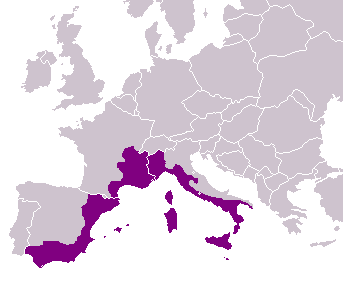
Areas in the Arco Latino

Latin Arch (Arco Latino) is also the formal name of an organisation of mutual cooperation between the sub-national entities of the mentioned region, which was founded in 1998. The organisation was originally composed of the Mediterranean départements and provinces. It now has 66 members.

== Mediterranean Latin Arch (Organization) ==
A geo-strategic economic integration area is underway, known as the Mediterranean Latin Arch, which is aimed to be finished by 2020.
