= Punta Rasca Lighthouse =

Lighthouse in Tenerife, Spain

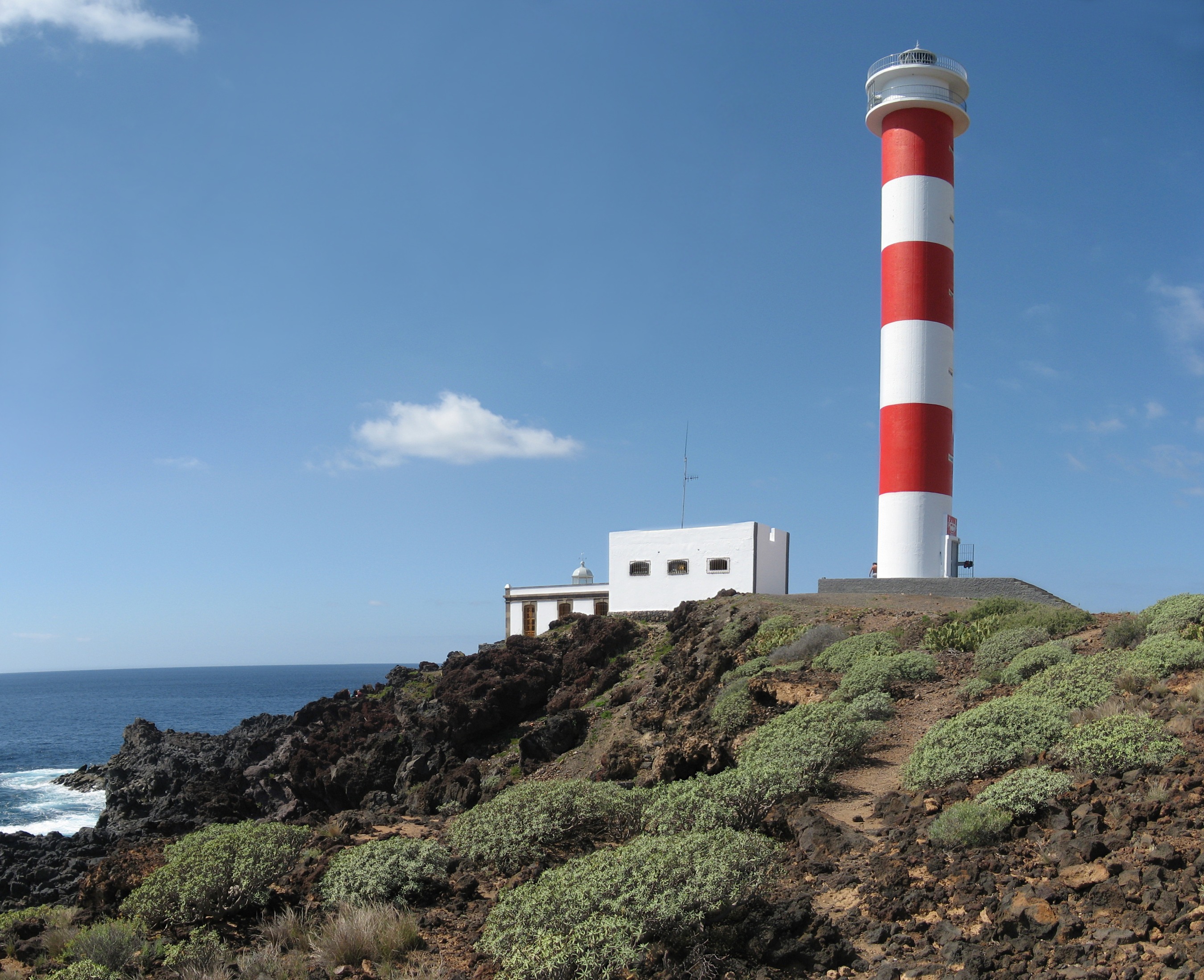
- Punta Rasca in 2007
- Location: Arona; Tenerife; Canary Islands; Spain
- Coordinates: 28.0011°N 16.6944°W

Tower
- Constructed: 1895 (first)
- Foundation: reinforced concrete
- Construction: concrete tower (current)
- Height: 32 metres (105 ft) (current); 6 metres (20 ft) (first)
- Shape: cylindrical tower with double balcony and lantern (current) lantern on the keeper's house roof (first)
- Markings: white tower with three red bands, white lantern (current) white keeper's house with stone trim
- Operator: Autoridad Portuaria de Santa Cruz de Tenerife

Light
- First lit: 1978 (current)
- Focal height: 51 metres (167 ft)
- Range: 17 nautical miles (31 km; 20 mi)
- Characteristic: Fl (3) W 12s.
- Spain no.: ES-12890

The Punta Rasca Lighthouse (Spanish: Faro de Punta Rasca) is an active lighthouse in the municipality of Arona on the Canary Island of Tenerife. The current lighthouse was the second to be constructed on the headland of Punta Rasca, which is located close to the most southerly point on the island at Punta Salemas. It lies between the Punta Abona Lighthouse to the northeast and the Punta de Teno Lighthouse of Buenavista del Norte to the northwest.

== History ==
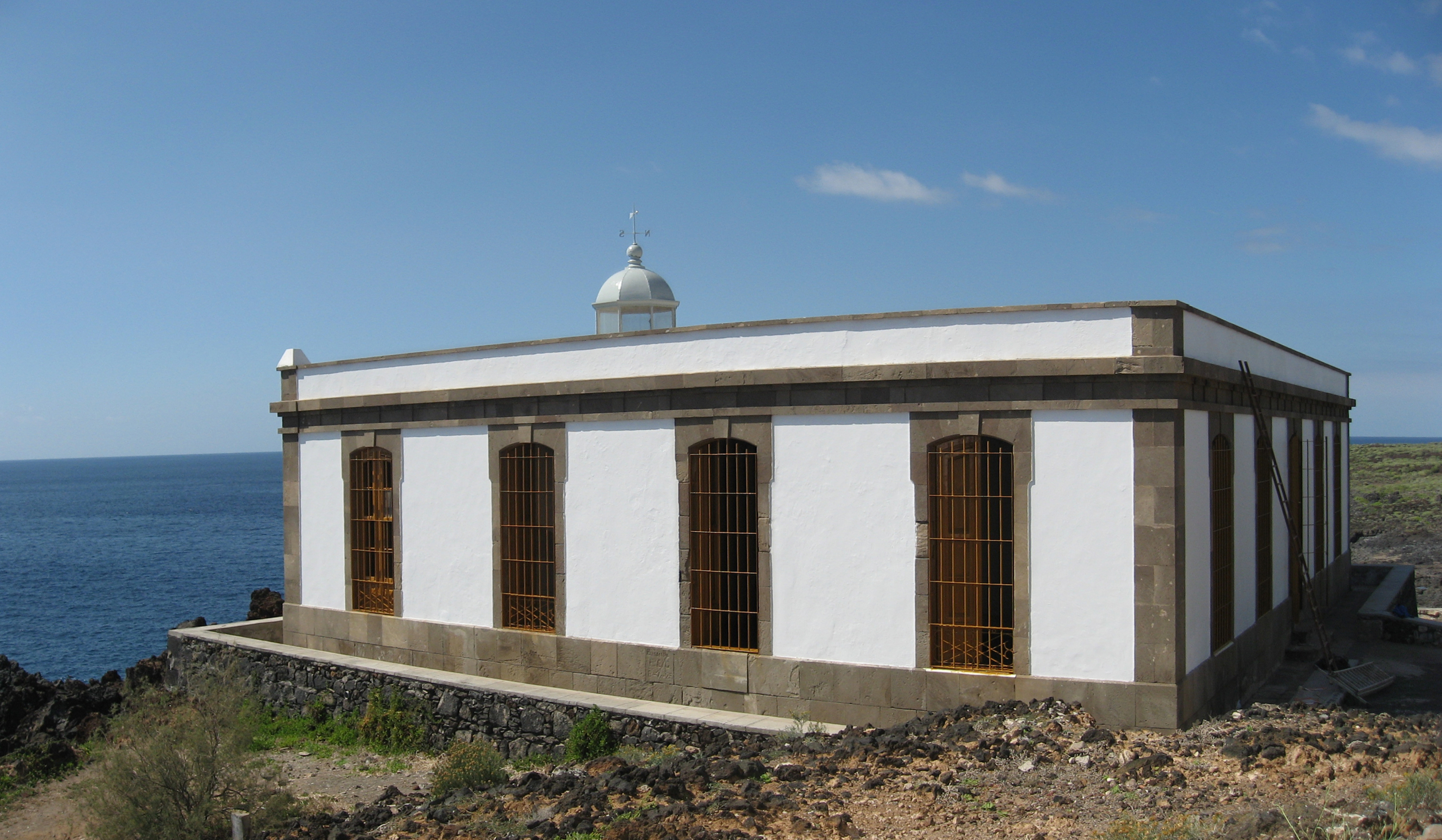
The first lighthouse at Punta Rasca

The first lighthouse was completed in 1895, as part of the first maritime lighting plan for the Canaries, to act as a navigation aid for the coastal shipping between Santa Cruz de Tenerife and the ports of the western Canary Islands. Built in a similar style to other Canarian 19th century lights, it consists of a white washed single storey building, with dark volcanic rock used for the masonry detailing. The lantern dome was attached to the roof of the building, on the seaward side, overlooking the Atlantic Ocean. It remained in service until it was replaced in the 1970s by the new modern tower.

The new lighthouse, which was built adjacent to the original building first entered service in 1978. It consists of a 32 m high cylinder-shaped tower, which is white with red bands, that supports twin galleries and a lantern with a black cupola. The design is the same, except twelve metres higher, than the new tower of Fuencaliente Lighthouse on La Palma. With a focal height of 51 m above sea level, the light can be seen for 17 nautical miles. Its light characteristic is made up of three flashes of white light every twelve seconds.

The lighthouse is maintained by the Port authority of the Province of Santa Cruz de Tenerife. It is registered under the international Admiralty number D2830 and has the NGA identifier of 113-23832.

Map showing the principal lighthouses of Tenerife

== Gallery ==
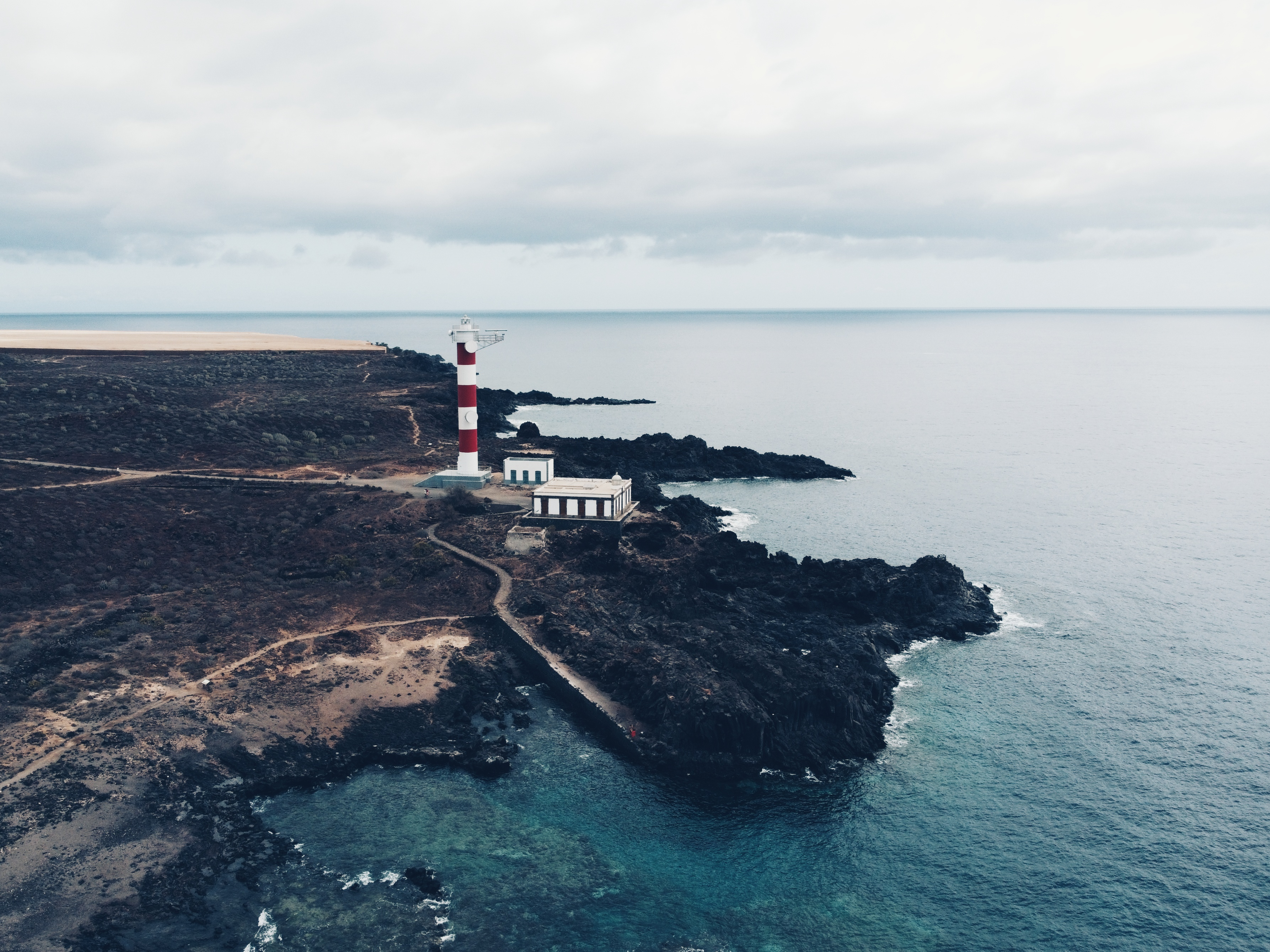
Aerial perspective of Punta Rasca Lighthouse

== See also ==
- List of lighthouses in the Canary Islands
- List of lighthouses in Spain
