= List of lighthouses in the Canary Islands =

This is a list of lighthouses in the Canary Islands. The Spanish archipelago lies in the Atlantic Ocean.

== Lighthouses ==
Lighthouse	Image	Location & coordinates	Island	Year built	Tower height	Focal height	Range nml
Arenas Blancas		Villa de Mazo; 28.56992°N 17.76056°W	La Palma	1993	38 m (125 ft)	46 m (151 ft)	20 nmi (37 km)
Buenavista		Buenavista del Norte; 28.39108°N 16.83650°W	Tenerife	1990	41 m (135 ft)	77 m (253 ft)	20 nmi (37 km)
La Farola del Mar		Santa Cruz de Tenerife; 28.46935°N 16.24581°W	Tenerife	1862	6 m (20 ft)	10 m (33 ft)	Inactive
Fuencaliente		Fuencaliente; 28.45528°N 17.84308°W	La Palma	1903/1985	24 m (79 ft)	36 m (118 ft)	14 nmi (26 km)
La Isleta		Las Palmas; 28.17408°N 15.41897°W	Gran Canaria	1865	10 m (33 ft)	249 m (817 ft)	21 nmi (39 km)
Maspalomas		Maspalomas; 27.73513°N 15.5989°W	Gran Canaria	1890	56 m (184 ft)	60 m (197 ft)	19 nmi (35 km)
Morro Jable		Morro Jable; 28.04613°N 14.333°W	Fuerteventura	1991	59 m (194 ft)	62 m (203 ft)	17 nmi (31 km)
Puerto de la Cruz		Puerto de la Cruz; 28.41850°N 16.55405°W	Tenerife	1995	27 m (89 ft)	31 m (102 ft)	16 nmi (30 km)
Puerto del Rosario		Puerto del Rosario; 28.50534°N 13.84371°W	Fuerteventura	1992	43 m (141 ft)	48 m (157 ft)	20 nmi (37 km)
Punta Abona		Arico; 28.14818°N 16.42718°W	Tenerife	1902/1978	39 m (128 ft)	54 m (177 ft)	17 nmi (31 km)
Punta Cumplida		Barlovento; 28.83901°N 17.77814°W	La Palma	1867	34 m (112 ft)	63 m (207 ft)	24 nmi (44 km)
Punta de Anaga		Anaga; 28.58132°N 16.14003°W	Tenerife	1864	12 m (39 ft)	247 m (810 ft)	21 nmi (39 km)
Punta de Arinaga		Agüimes, Las Palmas; 27.86407°N 15.38464°W	Gran Canaria	1897/1984	14 m (46 ft)	47 m (154 ft)	12 nmi (22 km)
Punta de Melenara		Telde; 27.99177°N 15.36792°W	Gran Canaria	1905	17 m (56 ft)	33 m (108 ft)	12 nmi (22 km)
Punta de Rasca		Arona; 28.00109°N 16.69439°W	Tenerife	1976	32 m (105 ft)	51 m (167 ft)	17 nmi (31 km)
Punta de Teno		Macizo de Teno; 28.34199°N 16.92285°W	Tenerife	1897/1976	20 m (66 ft)	60 m (197 ft)	18 nmi (33 km)
Punta del Castillete		Puerto de Mogán; 27.81933°N 15.76849°W	Gran Canaria	1996	21 m (69 ft)	114 m (374 ft)	17 nmi (31 km)
Punta del Hidalgo		San Cristóbal de La Laguna; 28.57637°N 16.32878°W	Tenerife	1991	50 m (164 ft)	52 m (171 ft)	16 nmi (30 km)
Punta Delgada		Alegranza; 29.40329°N 13.48855°W	Alegranza	1865	15 m (49 ft)	18 m (59 ft)	12 nmi (22 km)
Punta Jandía		Jandía; 28.06572°N 14.50707°W	Fuerteventura	1864/1954	19 m (62 ft)	33 m (108 ft)	22 nmi (41 km)
Punta La Entallada		Tuineje; 28.2301°N 13.94789°W	Fuerteventura	1955	12 m (39 ft)	196 m (643 ft)	21 nmi (39 km)
Punta Lava		Tazacorte; 28.59667°N 17.92568°W	La Palma	1993	48 m (157 ft)	51 m (167 ft)	20 nmi (37 km)
Punta Martiño		Lobos Island; 28.76483°N 13.81490°W	Lobos	1865	7 m (23 ft)	29 m (95 ft)	14 nmi (26 km)
Punta Orchilla		La Frontera; 27.70666°N 18.14758°W	El Hierro	1933	25 m (82 ft)	132 m (433 ft)	24 nmi (44 km)
Punta Pechiguera		Playa Blanca; 28.85575°N 13.87259°W	Lanzarote	1866/1988	50 m (164 ft)	55 m (180 ft)	17 nmi (31 km)
Punta Sardina		Gáldar, Las Palmas; 28.16464°N 15.70778°W	Gran Canaria	1891/1985	20 m (66 ft)	48 m (157 ft)	20 nmi (37 km)
San Cristóbal		San Sebastián; 28.09609°N 17.10007°W	La Gomera	1903/1978	15 m (49 ft)	84 m (276 ft)	21 nmi (39 km)
Tostón		La Oliva; 28.71539°N 14.01368°W	Fuerteventura	1897/1986	30 m (98 ft)	35 m (115 ft)	17 nmi (31 km)

== Map ==
Map showing the principal lighthouses of the Canary Islands

== See also ==
- List of lighthouses in Spain
- List of lighthouses in the Balearic Islands
