= Punta de Teno Lighthouse =

Lighthouse on Tenerife, Spain

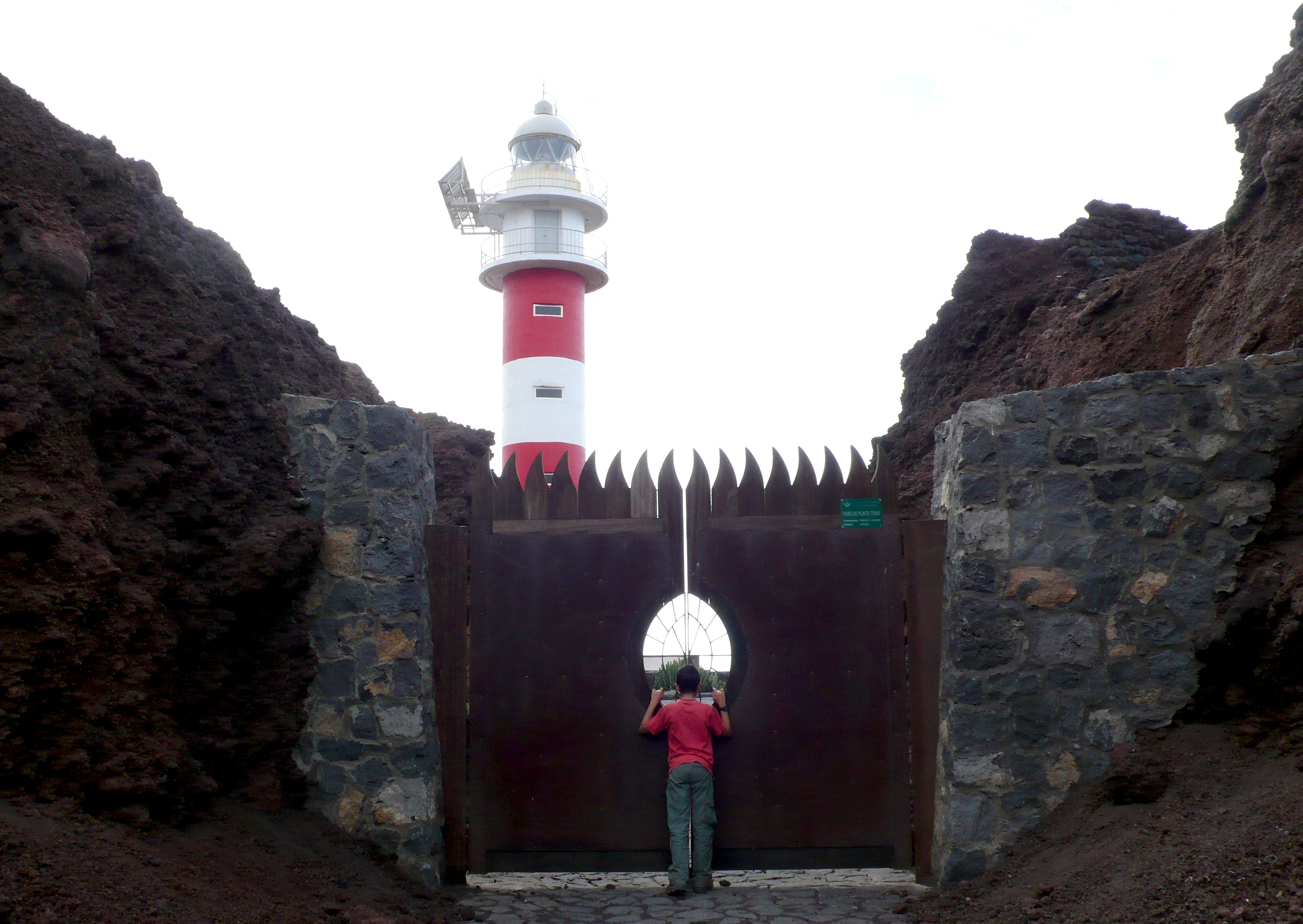
- Location: Buenavista del Norte; Tenerife; Canary Islands; Spain
- Coordinates: 28.342096°N 16.922865°W

Tower
- Constructed: 1897 (first)
- Construction: concrete tower (current) stone tower (first)
- Height: 20 metres (66 ft) (current); 8 metres (26 ft) (first)
- Shape: cylindrical tower with balcony and lantern
- Markings: tower with red and white bands (current) unpainted tower (first)
- Power source: solar power
- Operator: Autoridad Portuaria de Santa Cruz de Tenerife

Light
- First lit: 1976 (current)
- Focal height: 60 metres (200 ft)
- Range: 18 nautical miles (33 km; 21 mi)
- Characteristic: Fl (2+1) W 20s.
- Spain no.: ES-12920

The Punta de Teno Lighthouse (Spanish: Faro de Punta de Teno) is an active lighthouse in the municipality of Buenavista del Norte on the Canary Island of Tenerife. The current lighthouse was the second to be constructed on the narrow rocky headland of Punta de Teno, which is the most westerly point on the island. It is one of seven lighthouses which mark the coastline of Tenerife, and lies between the Punta Rasca Lighthouse to the southeast, and the modern lighthouse of Buenavista to the northeast.

== History ==
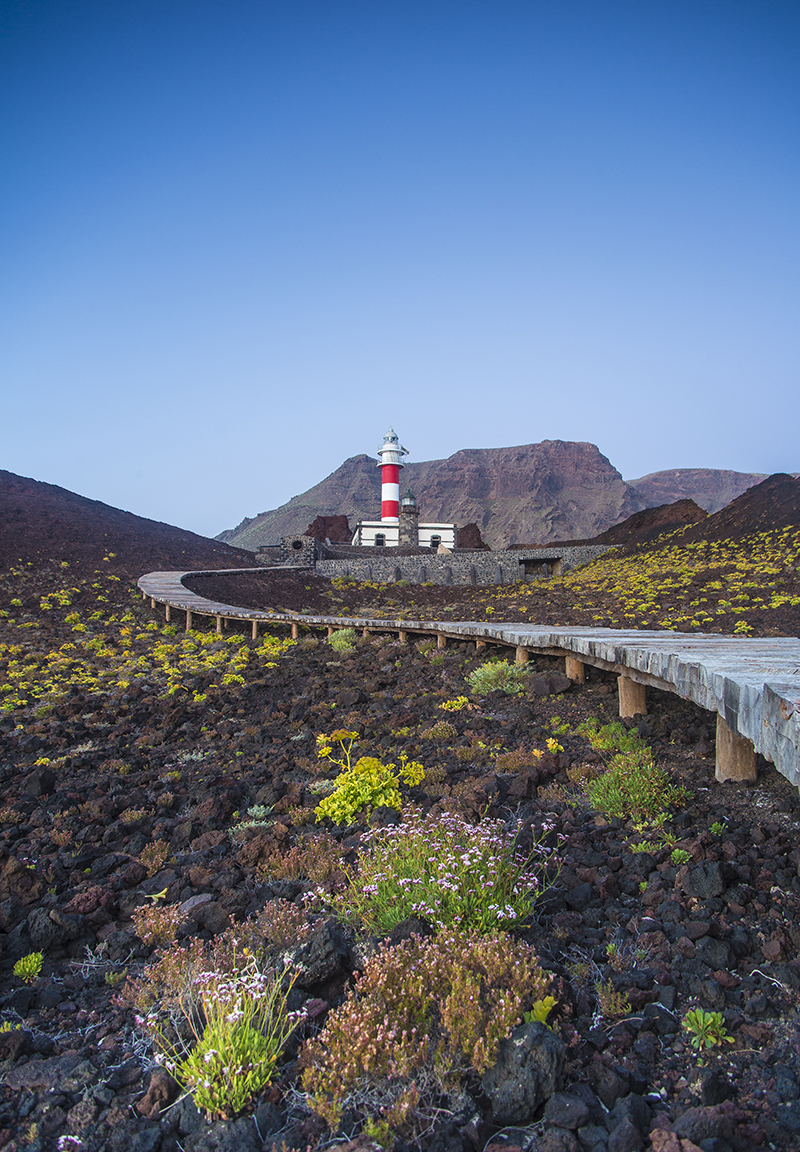
The 19th and 20th century towers of Punta de Teno

The first lighthouse was completed in 1897, as part of the first maritime lighting plan for the Canaries. Built in a similar style to other Canarian 19th century lights, it consists of a white washed single storey building, with dark volcanic rock used for the masonry detailing. The light was shown from a lantern room at the top of an eight-metre high masonry tower, attached to the seaward side of the house, overlooking the Atlantic Ocean. It remained in service until it was replaced in the 1970s by the new modern tower.

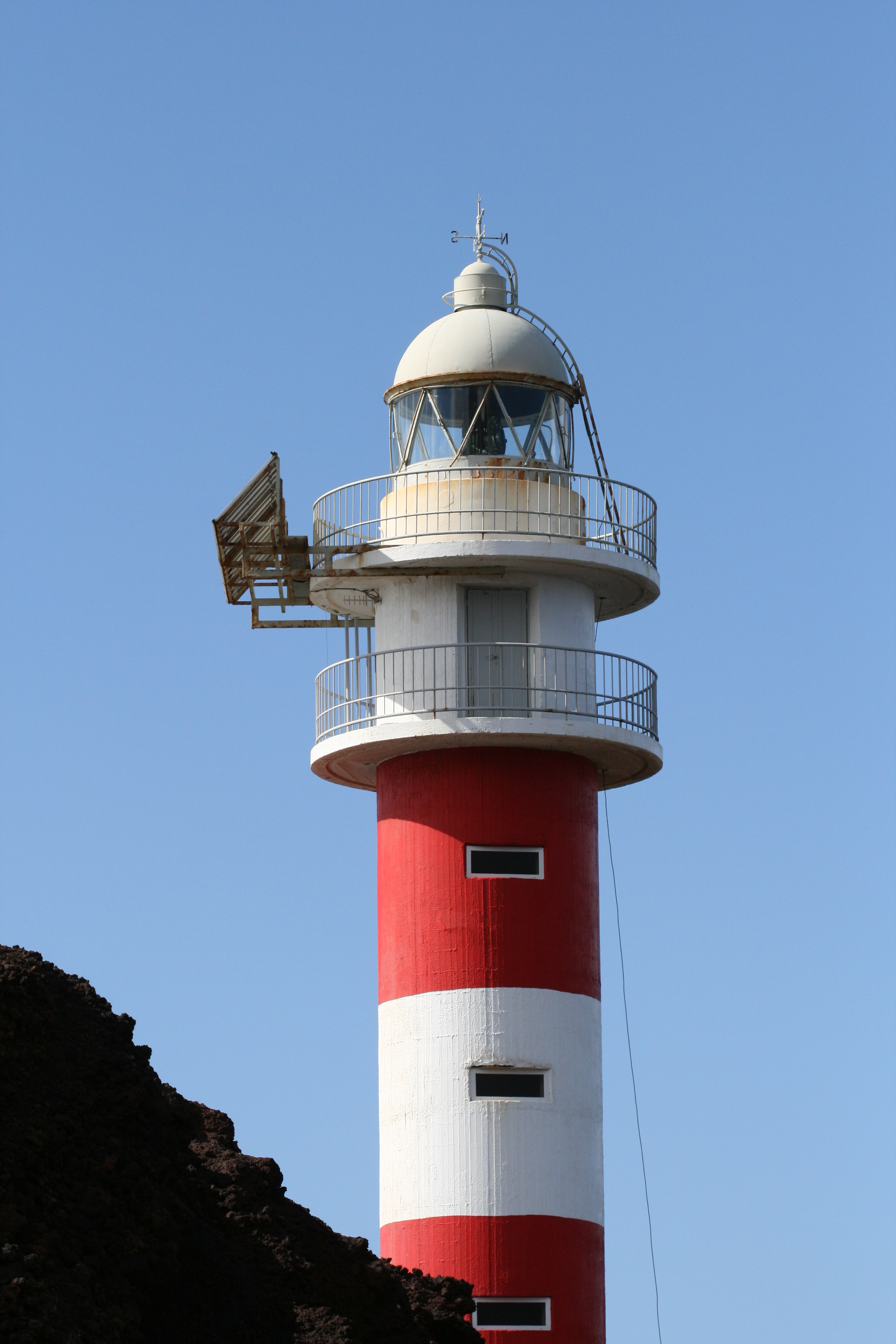
Punta de Teno – Detail of the tower

The new lighthouse, which was built adjacent to the original building first entered service in 1978. It consists of a 20 m high cylinder-shaped tower, which is white with red bands, that supports twin galleries and a lantern with a white cupola. The design is similar to the new tower of Fuencaliente Lighthouse on La Palma.

With a focal height of 60 m above sea level, the light can be seen for 18 nautical miles. Its light characteristic is made up of a pattern of three flashes of white light every twenty seconds.

The lighthouse is maintained by the Port authority of the Province of Santa Cruz de Tenerife. It is registered under the international Admiralty number D2832 and has the NGA identifier of 113-23840.

Map showing the principal lighthouses of Tenerife

== See also ==
- List of lighthouses in Spain
- List of lighthouses in the Canary Islands
