= San Cristóbal Lighthouse =

Lighthouse on La Gomera, Spain

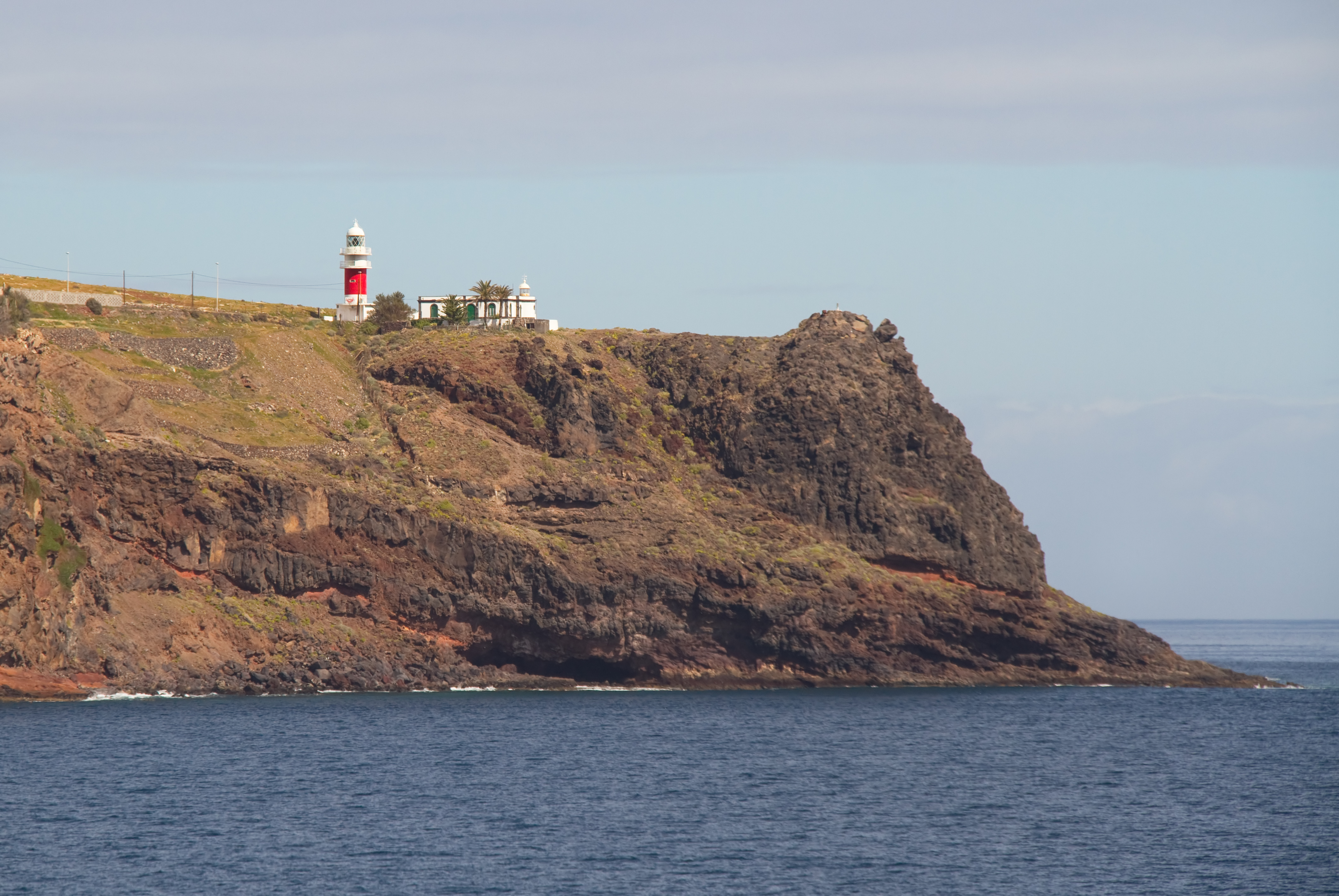
- San Cristóbal in 2013
- Location: San Sebastian, La Gomera
- Coordinates: 28.09609°N 17.10007°W

Tower
- Height: 15 metres (49 ft)

Light
- First lit: 1903/1978
- Focal height: 84 metres (276 ft)
- Range: 21 nautical miles (39 km; 24 mi)
- Characteristic: Fl (2) W 10s

The San Cristóbal Lighthouse (Spanish: Faro de San Cristóbal) is an active lighthouse on the Spanish island of La Gomera in the Canary islands. The current lighthouse is the second to have been constructed on the rocky headland of Punta de San Cristóbal (Saint Christopher's Point), on the eastern side of the island, overlooking the approaches to San Sebastián de La Gomera, the main port and capital of La Gomera.

== Description ==
San Cristóbal was commissioned as part of the second maritime lighting plan for the Canaries, and is the oldest and principal lighthouse of La Gomera. Construction of the first lighthouse began in 1900 and it became operational in 1903. Designed by the engineer by Juan de León y Castillo, it was built in a similar style to other early Canarian lights, consisting of a whitewashed single-storey keeper's house, with dark volcanic rock used for the masonry detailing. The light was shown from a lantern room at the top of a six-metre-high (20-foot) masonry tower, which was attached to the seaward side of the house, overlooking the Atlantic Ocean. It remained in service until 1978, when it was replaced by the new modern tower.

The new lighthouse became operational in 1978, and consists of a short, 15-metre cylindrical tower, painted white with a distinctive daymark of a wide red band. Its design is a smaller version of the one used for the Fuencaliente Lighthouse on the nearby island of La Palma.

The clifftop location of the lighthouse means that it has a focal height of 84 meters above sea level, with a nominal range of 21 nautical miles. The optics consist of a third order Fresnel lens, which has a light characteristic of two flashes of white light every ten seconds.

It is registered under the international Admiralty number D2842 and has the NGA identifier of 113–23812, and is managed by the Port Authority of Santa Cruz de Tenerife.

The site of the lighthouse at the end of the Camino del Faro (Calle Carretera al Faro) is open to the public, but the tower and buildings are closed

== See also ==
- List of lighthouses in Spain
- List of lighthouses in the Canary Islands
