= Punta del Hidalgo Lighthouse =

Lighthouse on Tenerife, Spain

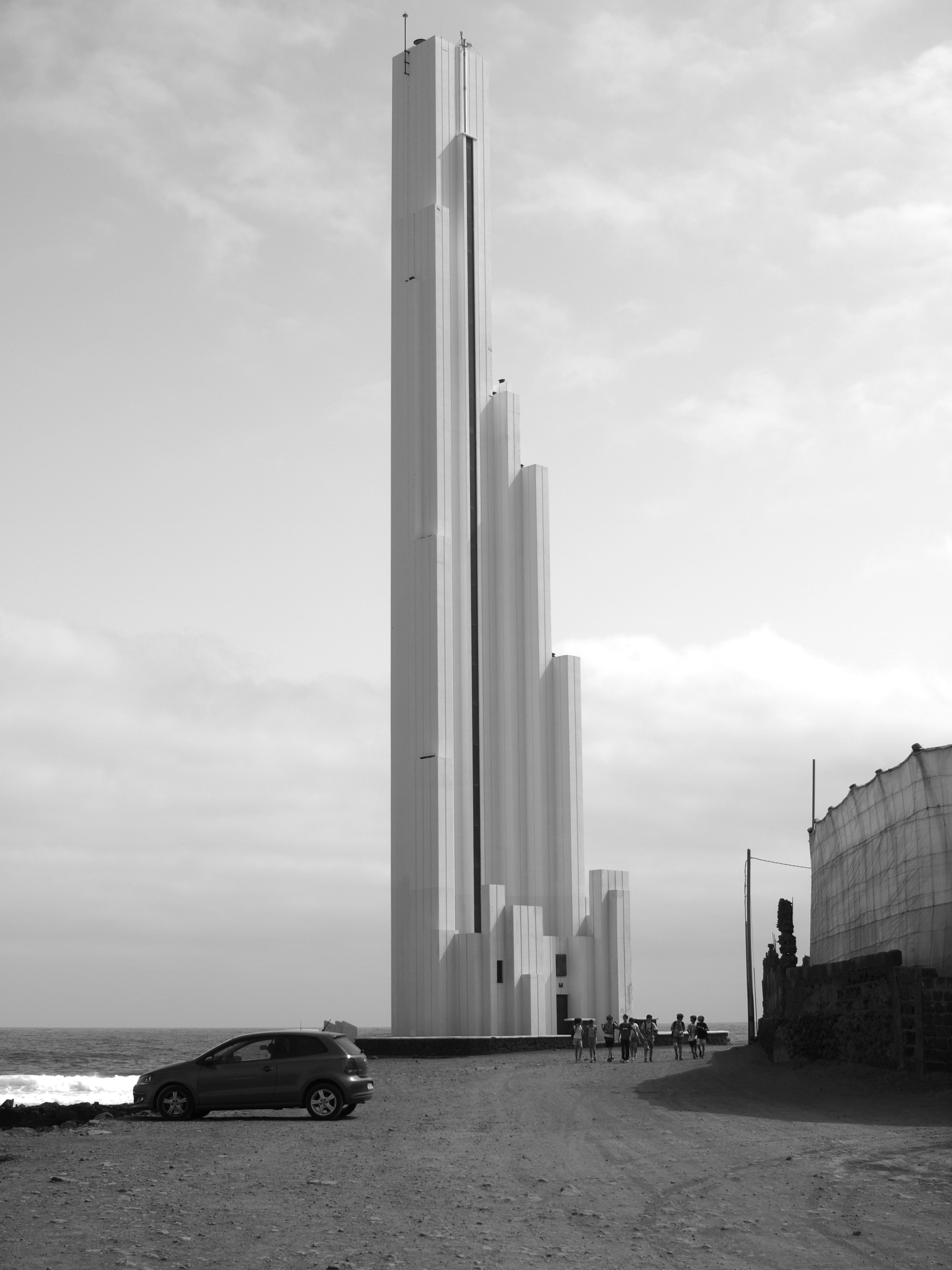
- The lighthouse in 2013
- Location: Punta del Hidalgo; Tenerife; Canary Islands; Spain
- Coordinates: 28.576384°N 16.328700°W

Tower
- Constructed: 1994
- Built by: Ramiro Rodríguez-Borlado Olavarrieta
- Height: 50 metres (160 ft)
- Markings: white tower
- Power source: mains electricity
- Operator: Autoridad Portuaria de Santa Cruz de Tenerife

Light
- Focal height: 52 metres (171 ft)
- Range: 16 nautical miles (30 km; 18 mi)
- Characteristic: Fl (3) W 16s.
- Spain no.: ES-12945

The Punta del Hidalgo Lighthouse (Spanish: Faro de Punta del Hidalgo) is an active lighthouse in Punta del Hidalgo within the municipality of San Cristóbal de La Laguna on the northeast coast of Tenerife in the Canary Islands.

This modern lighthouse has a unique angular design, consisting of unequal and irregular columns of increasing height rising from a triangular base. The lower columns culminate in a final square pillar which faces the sea and supports a light on a small post.

It is one of seven lighthouses which mark the coastline of Tenerife, and lies between two other modern lighthouses of Puerto de la Cruz to the southwest, and Punta de Anaga to the east.

== Description ==
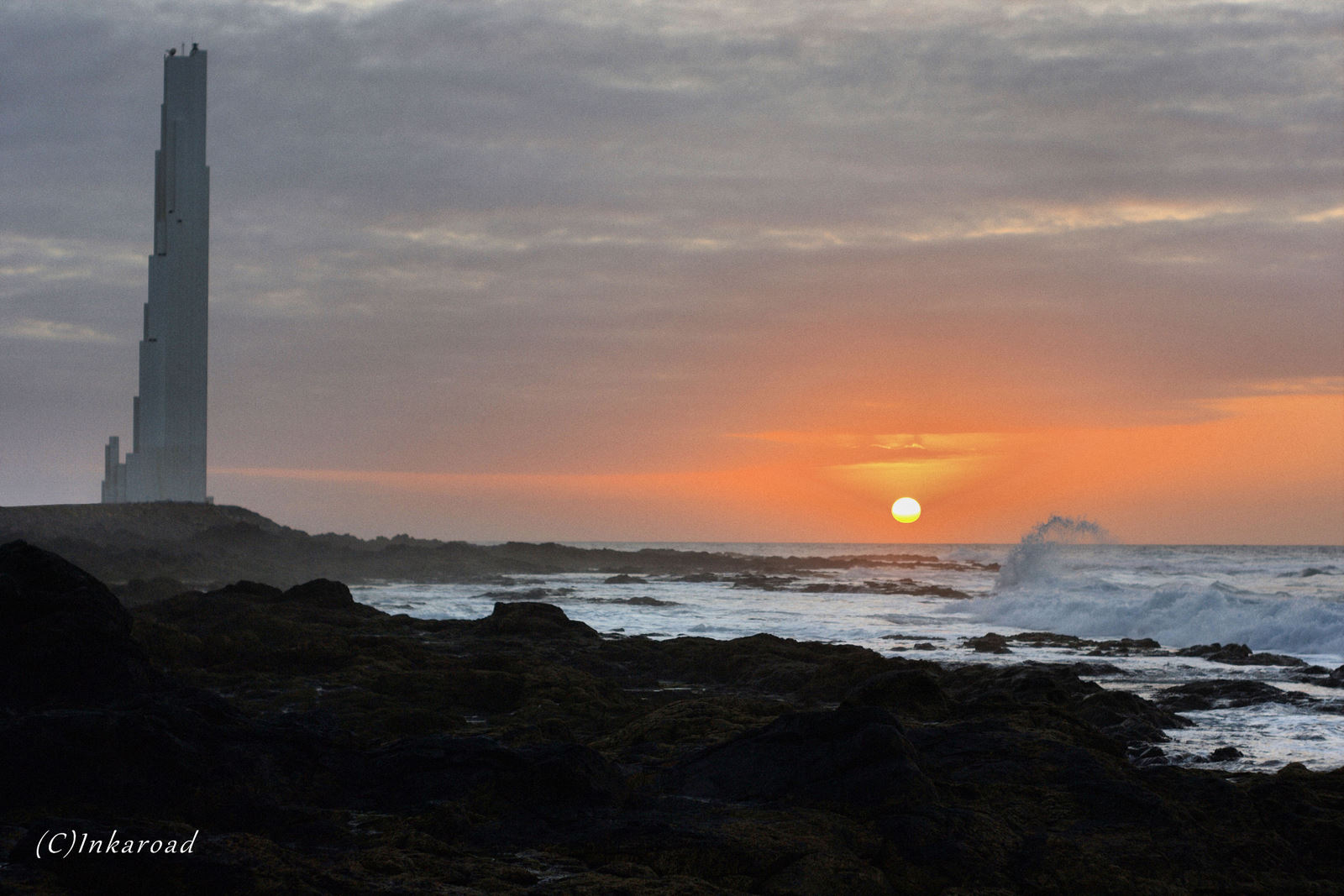
Punta Hidalgo at sunset

The construction of the lighthouse was completed in 1992 and it became operational in 1994, as part of the maritime lighting plan that was drawn up in the 1980s, which included the need for new lights at a number of locations in the Canaries. These included the contemporary designed lights at Puerto de la Cruz and Buenavista on Tenerife, Castilette on Gran Canaria, and Arenas Blancas and Punta Lava on La Palma.

The 50-metre-high (160 ft) lighthouse is built of reinforced concrete. Materials used in its construction were brought in specially, including the white gravel, and coloured concrete used to produce the white finish. A system of sliding scaffolding was used to complete the project within a few months in 1992. With a focal height of 52 metres (171 ft) above sea level, the light can be seen for 16 nautical miles. Its light characteristic is made up of a pattern of two flashes of white light every seven seconds.

The lighthouse is maintained by the Port authority of the Province of Santa Cruz de Tenerife. It is registered under the international Admiralty number D2818 and has the NGA identifier of 113–23854.

In 2007, Hidalgo in conjunction with five other Spanish lighthouses was depicted in a set of six commemorative stamps by the postal service Correos.

Map showing the principal lighthouses of Tenerife

== See also ==
- List of lighthouses in the Canary Islands
- List of lighthouses in Spain
