= Buenavista Lighthouse =

Lighthouse on Tenerife, Spain

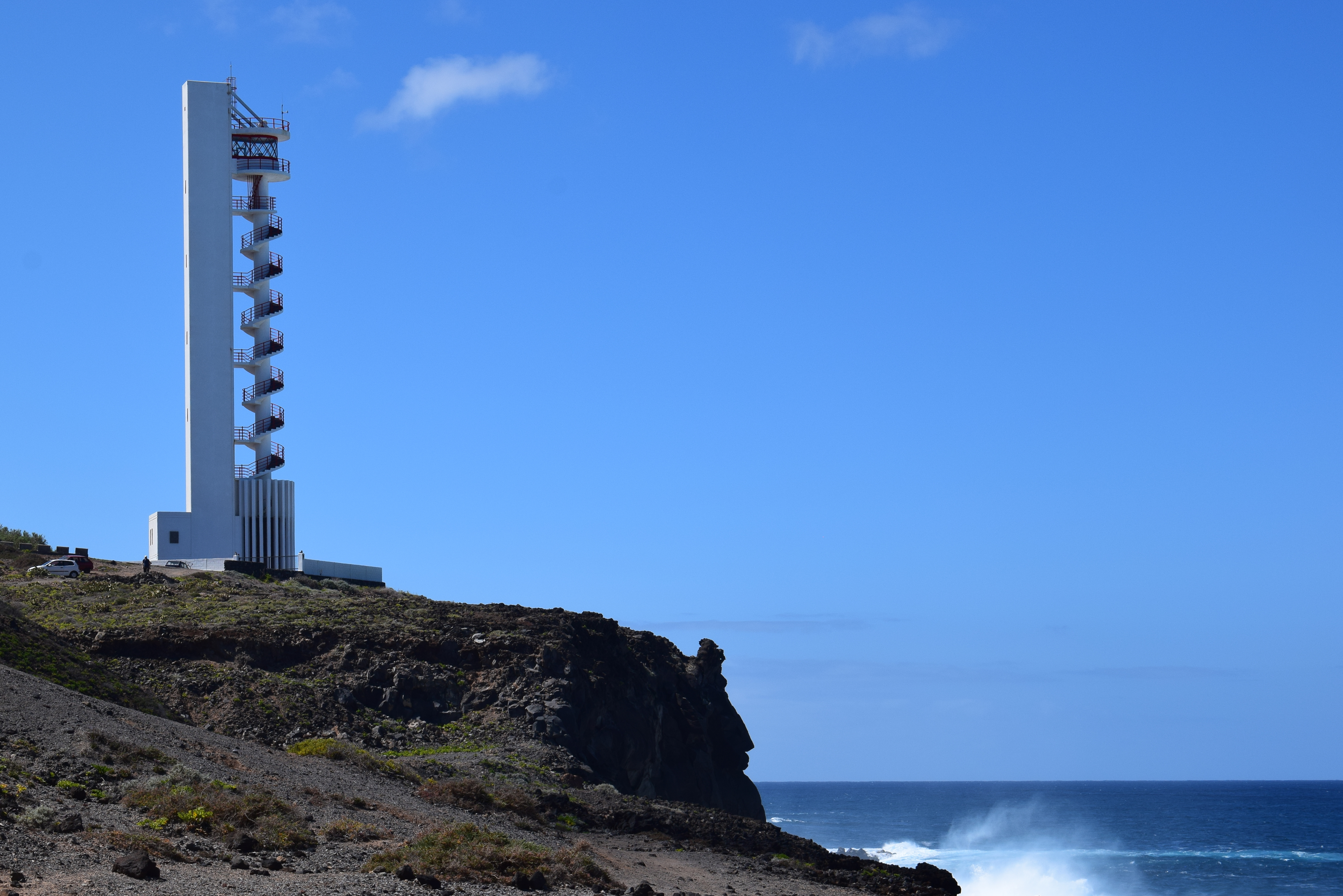
- Location: Buenavista del Norte; Tenerife; Canary Islands; Spain
- Coordinates: 28.3911°N 16.8365°W

Tower
- Constructed: 1990
- Construction: concrete tower
- Height: 41 metres (135 ft)
- Shape: tower with external spiral staircase
- Markings: white tower
- Power source: mains electricity
- Operator: Autoridad Portuaria de Santa Cruz de Tenerife

Light
- First lit: 1997
- Focal height: 77 metres (253 ft)
- Range: 20 nautical miles (37 km; 23 mi)
- Characteristic: [(L 0 5 oc 1 5)3 veces]L 0 5 oc 4 5
- Spain no.: ES-12925

The Buenavista Lighthouse (Spanish: Faro de Buenavista), also known as the Punta de Buenavista lighthouse, is an active lighthouse in the municipality of Buenavista del Norte on the northern coast of Tenerife in the Canary Islands.

This modern lighthouse, which has been described as being shaped like a corkscrew, is situated on a headland midway between the settlements of Buenavista del Norte and Los Silos. It is one of the seven main lighthouses which mark the coastline of Tenerife, and lies between two other lighthouses; Punta de Teno to the southwest, and Puerto de la Cruz to the northeast.

== Description ==
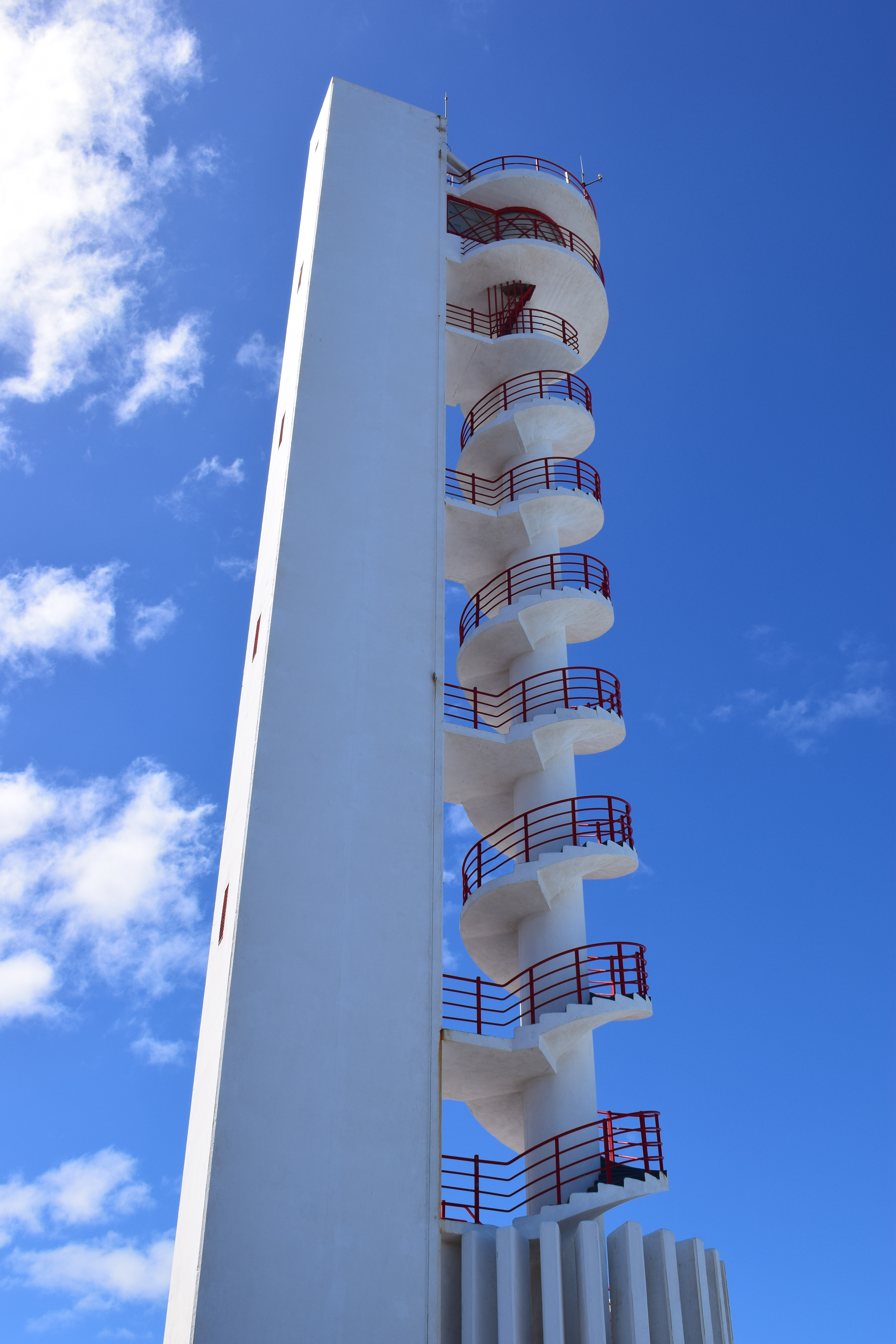
Detail of the tower

The lighthouse was completed in 1990, as part of the maritime lighting plan that was drawn up in the 1980s, which stressed the need for new lights at a number of locations in the Canaries. These included the contemporary designed lights at Punta del Hidalgo and Puerto de la Cruz on Tenerife, Castilette on Gran Canaria, and Arenas Blancas and Punta Lava on La Palma.

Considered to be a "remarkable design", it consists of two concrete towers rising from a single base, the rearward one is square, with the seaward facing tower having a spiral staircase that is open to the elements. This stairwell leads to the top of the tower with an enclosed lantern room and galleries, at a height of 40.5m. With a focal height of 77 m above sea level, the light can be seen for 20 nautical miles. Its light characteristic is made up of a pattern of four flashes of white light every eleven seconds.

The lighthouse is maintained by the Port authority of the Province of Santa Cruz de Tenerife. It is registered under the international Admiralty number D2831.8 and has the NGA identifier of 113–23838.

Map showing the principal lighthouses of Tenerife

== See also ==
- List of lighthouses in Spain
- List of lighthouses in the Canary Islands
