= Puerto del Rosario Lighthouse =

Lighthouse on Fuerteventura, Spain

Puerto del Rosario Lighthouse Gaviota
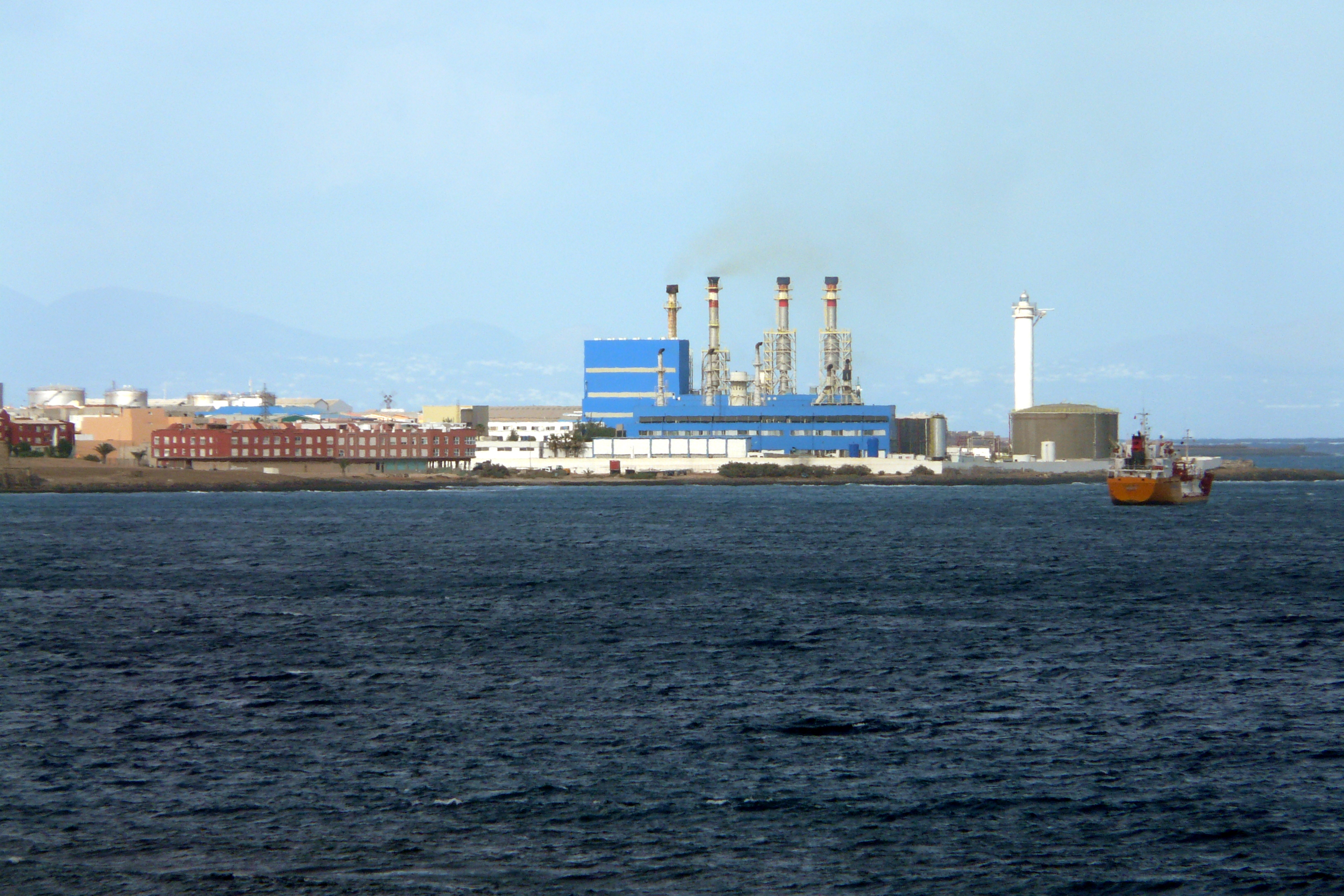
- Lighthouse to the right of the power station
- Location: Puerto del Rosario; Fuerteventura; Canary Islands; Spain
- Coordinates: 28.505378°N 13.843756°W

Tower
- Constructed: 1992
- Foundation: cylindrical basement
- Construction: concrete tower
- Height: 43 metres (141 ft)
- Shape: cylindrical tower with double balcony and lantern
- Markings: unpainted tower, grey lantern dome
- Power source: mains electricity
- Operator: Autoridad Portuaria de Las Palmas de Gran Canaria

Light
- Focal height: 48 metres (157 ft)
- Range: 20 nautical miles (37 km; 23 mi)
- Characteristic: Fl W 5s.
- Spain no.: ES-12165

The Puerto del Rosario Lighthouse (Spanish: Faro de Puerto del Rosario) also known as the Punta Gaviota Lighthouse is a modern active lighthouse on the Canary island of Fuerteventura. It is located in an industrial area at the north-eastern end of the town of Puerto del Rosario, the capital and major port of the island in the Province of Las Palmas.

== Description ==
The Puerto del Rosario Light is the main navigation marker for the shipping arriving at the port on the eastern side of the island. It lies between the Punta Martiño Lighthouse on the island of Lobos to the north and the Punta La Entallada Lighthouse in Tuineje to the south.

The lighthouse first entered service in 1992, as part of the third maritime lighting plan for the Canaries, other lighthouses that were built as part of the same plan include Punta Lava and Arenas Blancas on La Palma, Punta del Castillete on Gran Canaria and Morro Jable also on Fuerteventura. It consists of a 43 m high cylinder-shaped tower, which is white in colour, this supports twin galleries and a lantern with a grey cupola.

The optics include a 2.25m diameter lens, equipped with a 150 watt discharge lamp, which is connected to mains electricity and a back-up battery system. With a focal height of 48 m above sea level, the light can be seen for 20 nautical miles. Its light characteristic is a flash of white light every five seconds. The reserve light has a range of nine nautical miles.

The lighthouse is maintained by the port authority of Las Palmas, and is registered under the international Admiralty number D2793.5 and has the NGA identifier of 113–24034.

Map showing the principal lighthouses of Fuerteventura

== See also ==
- List of lighthouses in Spain
- List of lighthouses in the Canary Islands
