= Macizo de Teno =

Coordinates: 28°18′N 16°51′W

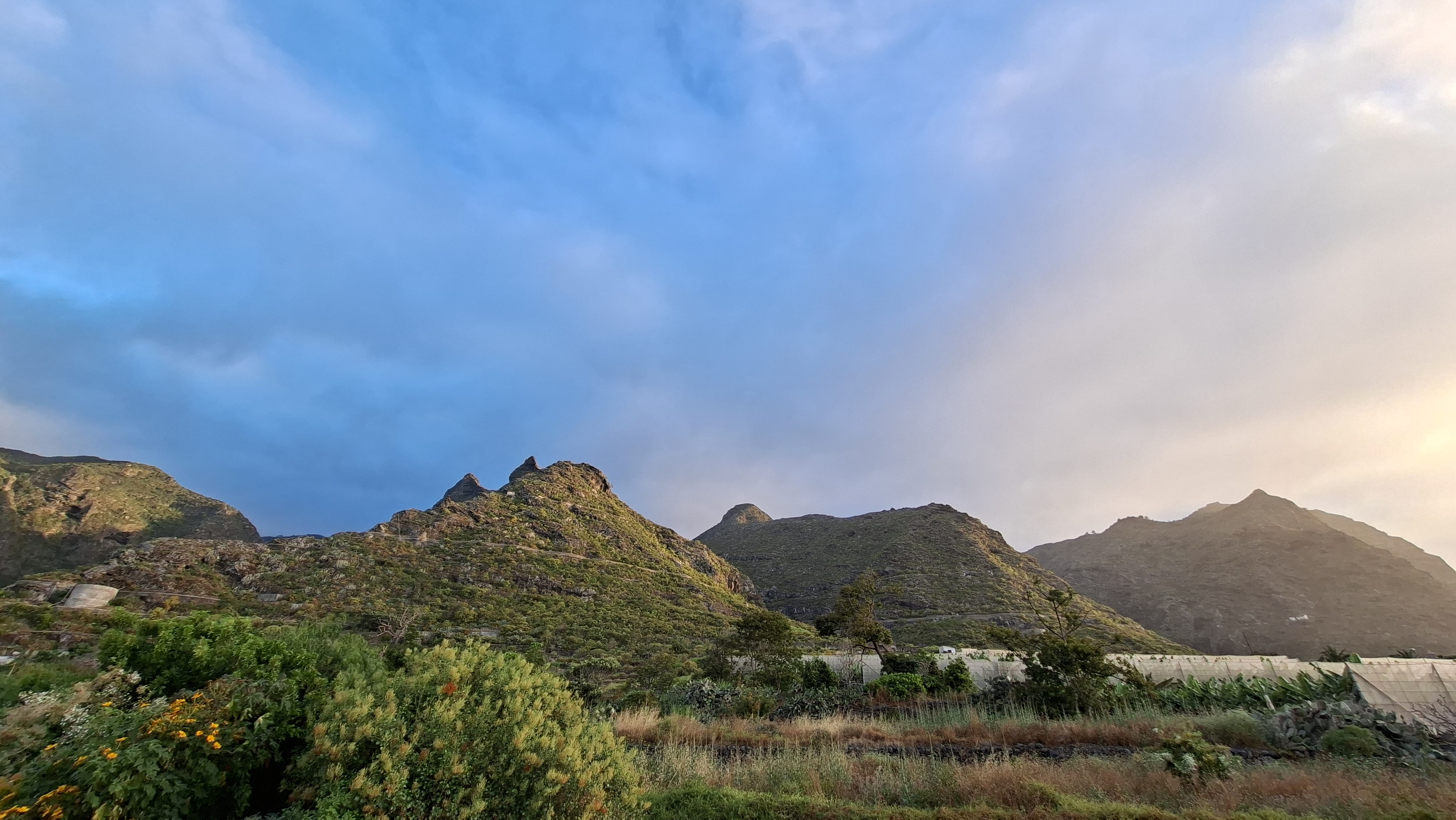
Teno massif near Los Silos, Tenerife

The Teno massif (Spanish: Macizo de Teno) is one of three volcanic formations that gave rise to Tenerife, Canary Islands, Spain. It is located in the northwestern part of the island between the towns of Santiago del Teide, Los Silos, El Tanque and Buenavista del Norte. The volcanic massif, emerged during the last 5 to 7 million years, is furrowed by deep ravines and ends abruptly in the sea, in an area known as Los Gigantes, a series of high cliffs that plummet over the sea. The villages known as Masca, Teno Alto, Los Carrizales, El Palmar, Las Portelas and Las Lagunetas preserve the old agricultural traditions of Canary Islands.

The Teno Rural Park has an area of 8063 hectares, and is characterised by basaltic lava flows and a plant and floristic diversity that varies widely with each insular microclimate. The zones known as Monte del Agua and Laderas del Baracán are renowned for their forests of laurel typical of the vegetation of Macaronesia. Euphorbia balsamifera and Carthamus lanatus, a variety of thistle, can be found in coastal areas.

The Punta de Teno is the westernmost promontory of Tenerife. It is an area renowned for its marine wild-life offering the best areas for diving. The European Union has designated the Macizo de Teno as a special area for the protection and conservation of the large colonies of pigeons that inhabit the laurel. Ospreys, hawks, kestrels and barbary falcons are also commonly sighted. The area also contains archaeological ruins, with the stone edifices belonging to the ancient Guanche inhabitants of the island.

== See also ==
- Macizo de Anaga
