= Puerto de la Cruz Lighthouse =

Lighthouse on Tenerife, Spain

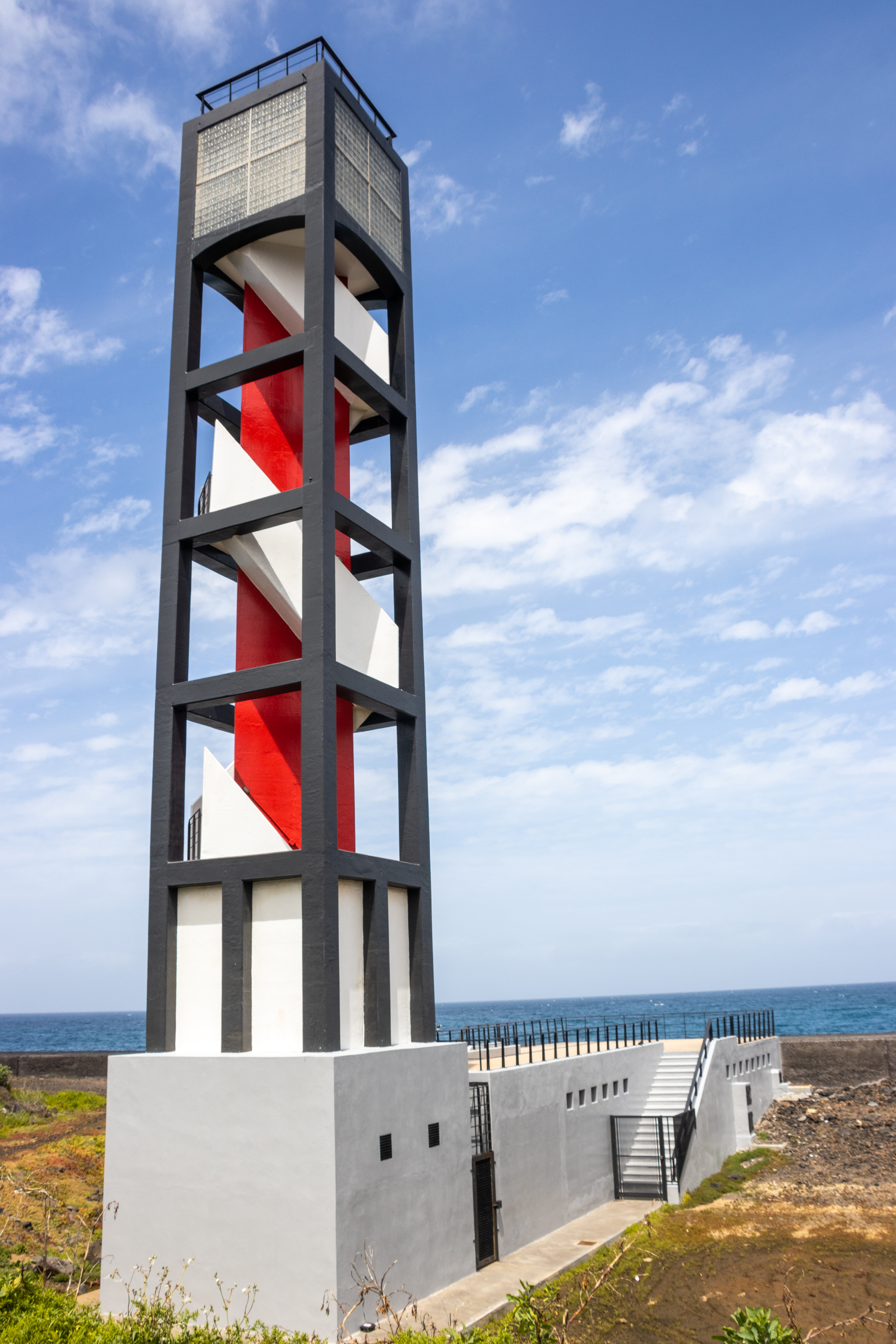
- Location: Puerto de la Cruz; Tenerife; Canary Islands; Spain
- Coordinates: 28.418631°N 16.554059°W

Tower
- Constructed: 1995
- Height: 27 metres (89 ft)
- Shape: square skeletal tower
- Markings: dark brown tower, white trim
- Operator: Autoridad Portuaria de Santa Cruz de Tenerife

Light
- Focal height: 31 metres (102 ft)
- Range: 16 nautical miles (30 km; 18 mi)
- Characteristic: Fl (2) W 7s.
- Spain no.: ES-12934

The Puerto de la Cruz Lighthouse (Spanish: Faro de Puerto de la Cruz) is an active lighthouse in Puerto de la Cruz on the northern coast of Tenerife in the Canary Islands. This modern lighthouse is situated within a seafront car park, to the west of the small port in the town. It is one of seven lighthouses which mark the coastline of Tenerife, and lies between two other modern lighthouses of Punta del Hidalgo to the northeast, and Buenavista to the west.

== Description ==
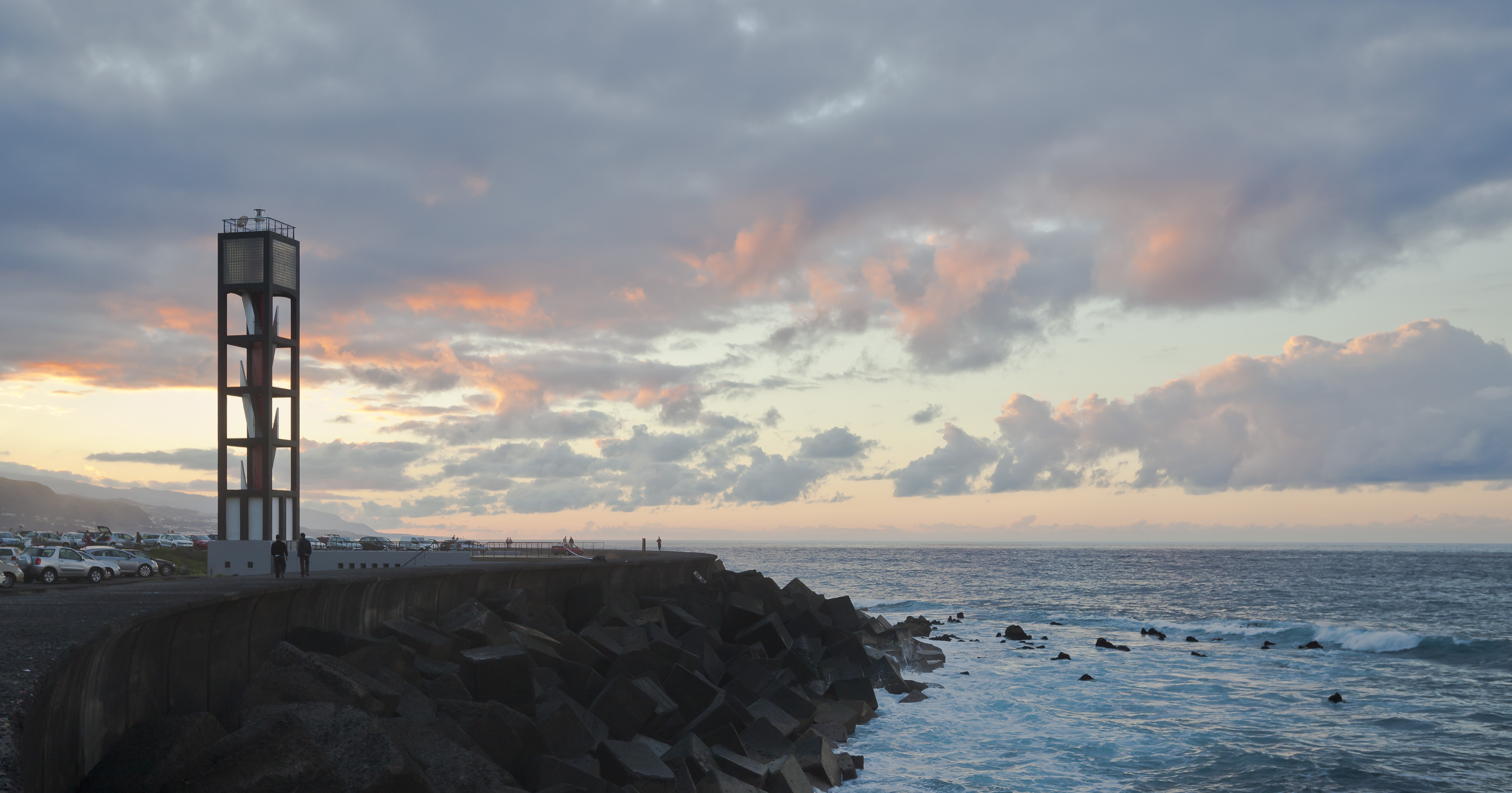
The lighthouse in 2012

The lighthouse was completed in 1995, as part of the maritime lighting plan that was drawn up in the 1980s, which included the need for new lights at a number of locations in the Canaries. These included the contemporary designed lights at Punta del Hidalgo and Buenavista on Tenerife, Castilette on Gran Canaria, and Arenas Blancas and Punta Lava on La Palma.

Considered to be of a "remarkable modern design", it consists of a 27 metres (89 ft) high metal framework tower of dark coloured steel, enclosing a central core with exposed flights of steps which lead to the top of the tower, from where the light is shown.

With a focal height of 31 metres (102 ft) above sea level, the light can be seen for 16 nautical miles. Its light characteristic is made up of a pattern of two flashes of white light every seven seconds.

The lighthouse is maintained by the Port authority of the Province of Santa Cruz de Tenerife. It is registered under the international Admiralty number D2833 and has the NGA identifier of 113–23842.

Map showing the principal lighthouses of Tenerife

== See also ==
- List of lighthouses in Spain
- List of lighthouses in the Canary Islands
