= Buenavista del Norte =

Buenavista del Norte (Spain)
- Municipality and town
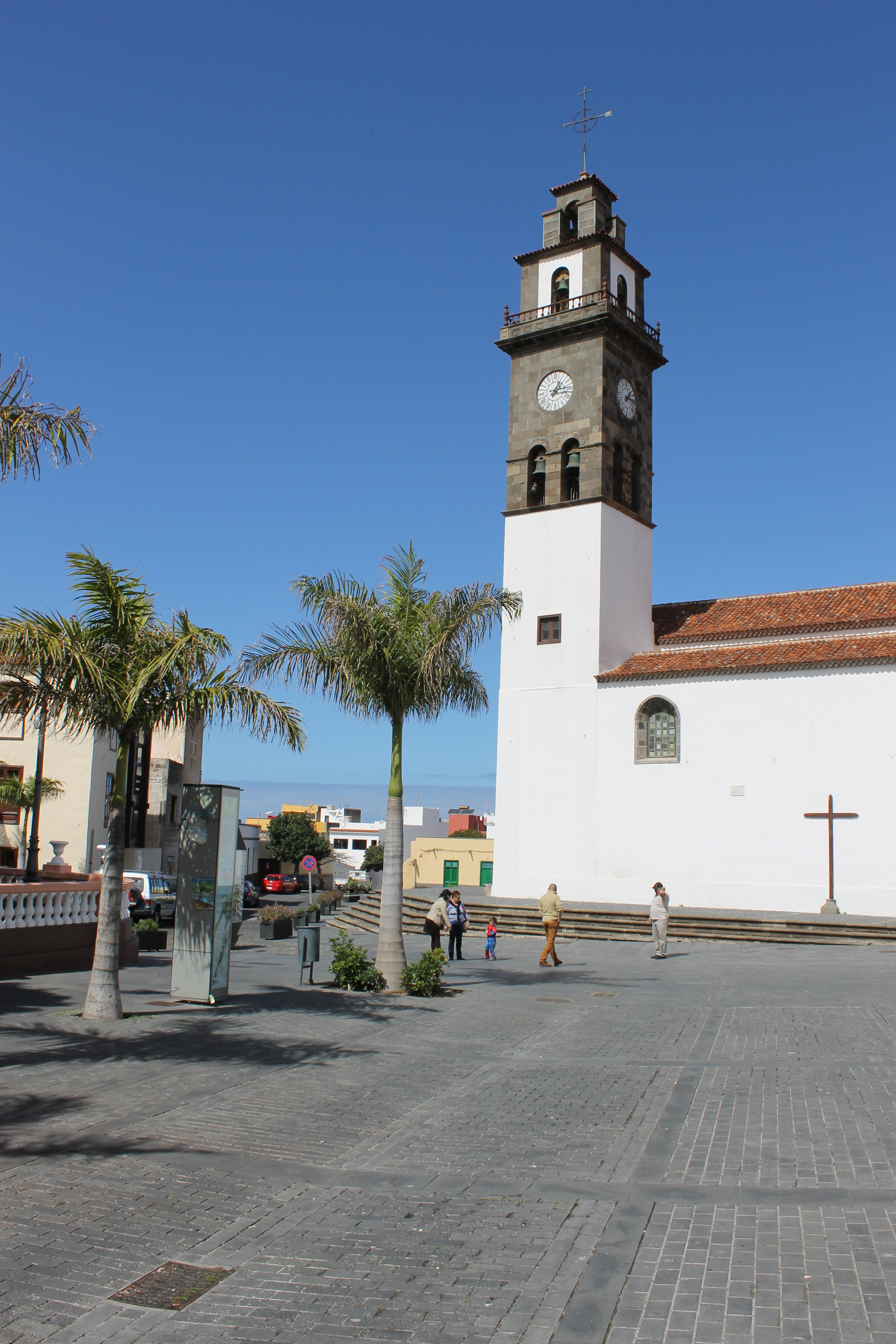
- Main square: Nuestra Señora de Los Remedios

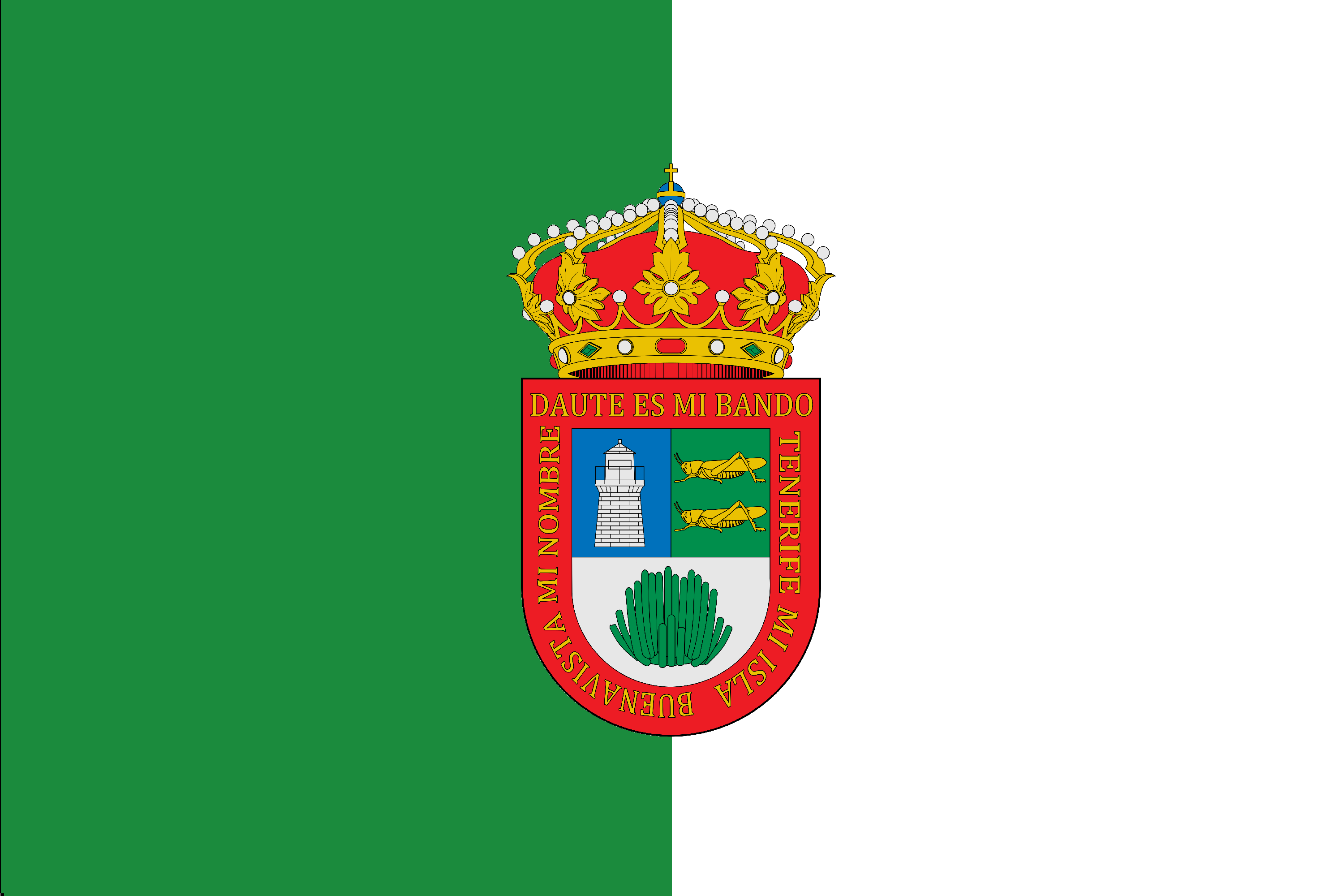
- Flag Coat of arms

- Municipal location in Tenerife

- Location in Tenerife Buenavista del Norte (Spain) (Canary Islands) Buenavista del Norte (Spain) (Spain, Canary Islands)
- Coordinates: 28°22′12″N 16°51′0″W
- Country: Spain
- Autonomous Region: Canary Islands
- Province: Santa Cruz de Tenerife
- Island: Tenerife
- Established: 2023

Government
  - Alcade (Mayor): Eva García (PSOE)

Area
  - Total: 67.42 km^{2} (26.03 sq mi)

Population (2025-01-01)
  - Total: 4,695
  - Density: 69.64/km^{2} (180.4/sq mi)
- Time zone: UTC+0 (GMT)
- Post Code: 38480
- Website: www.buenavistadelnorte.com

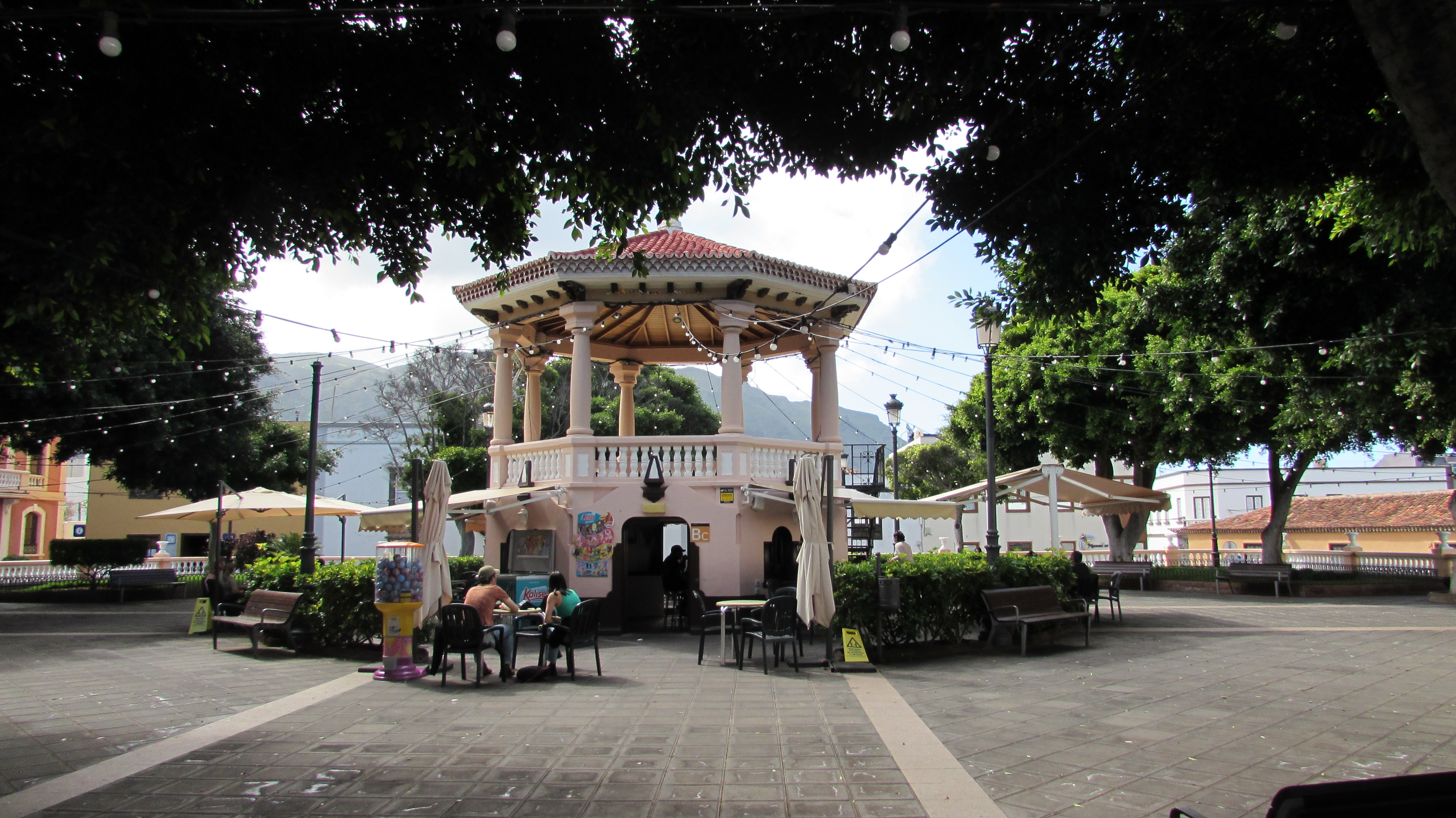
Place in Buenavista del Norte

Buenavista del Norte is a municipality and town on the north west coast of Tenerife, located on route TF42, about 75 km west of the capital Santa Cruz de Tenerife, 65 km from Tenerife North Airport and 66 km from Tenerife South Airport.

The towns streets show the sober architecture of clearly Andalusian extraction. Nevertheless, apart from the influence of the Conquistadors, there is a mixture of the traditions of Portuguese inhabitants and of Guanches, as the pre-Hispanic natives were known, which have helped to make up the particular charm of this district. The people have, due to the scarcity of resources, been characterised by an unquenchable spirit of conservation, which has kept alive traditions such as craftwork in bone, wood, cane and straw from the local forests of the region.

== Geography ==
=== Location (Spain) ===
The municipality of Buenavista del Norte is located at the extreme north west point of the island of Tenerife bordering with the municipalities of Los Silos to the east and Santiago del Teide to the south . It is connected with the former by TF42 and with the latter by the spectacular, but curvy route of Masca (at 650 m) TF436. The total surface spanned by the municipality is of 67.42 km^{2}, just 3% of the surface of the entire island. The volcanic formation of the Macizo de Teno that emerged over 7 million years ago constitutes the largest section of the territory.

== Population Distribution ==
Most of the population (75%) lives in the capital town located in the lower part of the municipality known as Casco antiguo. Most of the remaining inhabitants reside in either El Palmar (9%) at 300–500 m above sea level on TF436 or further along the same road in Las Portelas (6%) at 650 M above sea level. Las Canteras counts another 5.5% of the population, while the remaining locations, Masca, Teo and Los Carrizales are sparsely populated. The villages of Masca, Teno Alto, Los Carrizales, El Palmar, Las Portelas and Las Lagunetas preserve the old agricultural traditions of Canary Islands while in the lower coastal part, the cultivation of bananas dominates.

== Flora and Fauna ==
=== Coastal Vegetation ===
The bioclimatic coastal environment is classified as inframediterranean.

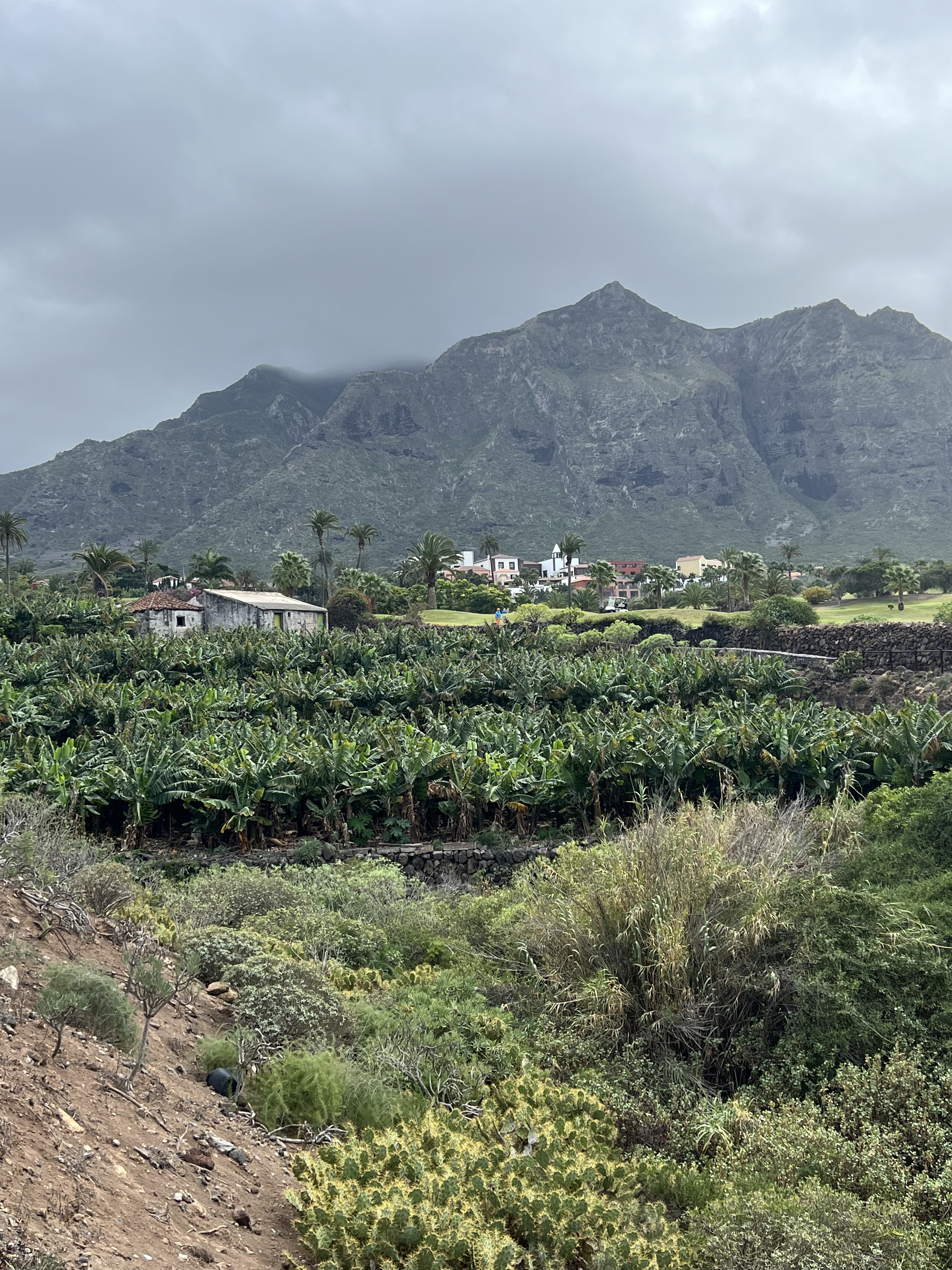
The coastal vegetation includes Indian fig opuntia and Euphorbia balsamifera. In the background visible: A banana plantation, the golf course, and the Teno massif.

The vegetation consists of both native and imported species that have established a symbiotic ecosystem whereby the invasive species may provide protection from human traffic, strong winds or water erosion for the native plant. This is exemplified that the high density growth of Prickly pear cactus and balsam spurge known locally as tabaiba. Both are abundant along the coastal region as close as 30 meters from the ocean, from Punta Teno to the Buenavista Lighthouse close to the border with Los Silos. Also prominent because of its size is Canary Island spurge. Two varieties of Patellifolia, patellaris and procumbens, are often found very close to the shore. Many of its characteristic resemble Tetragonia tetragonoides with which it shares a strong salt tolerance and mode of propagation. A few examples of Kleinia neriifolia can be found close to the basaltic cliffs. It becomes more dominant further inland, abundant on the volcanic dome (with a crater that was converted into a reservoir, known as Embalse Montaña de Taco) south of the Buenavista Lighthouse. A variety of Argyranthemum, (coronopifolium or adauctum) is abundant, Asparagus pastorianus is the major asparagus variety found along the coastal region. Astydamia latifolia is easily recognized as a plant of the celery family by is characteristic fragrance similar to angelica. It is important in the seasonal parched to green transformation of the coastal landscape as it loses most its leaves during the dry period that sprout again from a rizome after the first autumn rains. Large bushes of Salsola divaricata remain predominantly green in the dry season flowering after the rains. Schizogyne sericea is ubiquitous forming large bushes with yellow flowers. Sea fennel recognizable from its distinct smell and grey-green color of its succulent leaves, is found on the basaltic cliffs a few meters from the ocean but seldom inland more than 200 meters. Other common plants are Euphorbia aphylla, Hyoscyamus albus, Mesembryanthemum crystallinum, Monanthes laxiflora, Nicotiana glauca, Periploca laevigata.

== Climate ==
Buenavista del Norte has a Mediterranean climate, with most rain falling from October to March. Its exposed northwesterly location allows it to trap most of the moisture condensed by the mountains of Tenerife, so that it receives over three times more rainfall than Santa Cruz de Tenerife.

Climate data for Buenavista del Norte
Month	Jan	Feb	Mar	Apr	May	Jun	Jul	Aug	Sep	Oct	Nov	Dec	Year
Mean daily maximum °C (°F)	17.1 (62.8)	17.0 (62.6)	17.2 (63.0)	17.3 (63.1)	18.6 (65.5)	19.9 (67.8)	22.3 (72.1)	23.1 (73.6)	22.6 (72.7)	21.5 (70.7)	19.0 (66.2)	17.3 (63.1)	19.4 (66.9)
Mean daily minimum °C (°F)	12.1 (53.8)	11.5 (52.7)	11.8 (53.2)	11.9 (53.4)	13.1 (55.6)	14.4 (57.9)	16.7 (62.1)	17.7 (63.9)	17.2 (63.0)	16.5 (61.7)	14.9 (58.8)	13.0 (55.4)	14.2 (57.6)
Average precipitation mm (inches)	167 (6.6)	95 (3.7)	70 (2.8)	18 (0.7)	12 (0.5)	9 (0.4)	1 (0.0)	3 (0.1)	4 (0.2)	90 (3.5)	207 (8.1)	122 (4.8)	798 (31.4)
Source: Sistema de Clasificación Bioclimática Mundial
