= Punta de Anaga Lighthouse =

Lighthouse on Tenerife, Spain

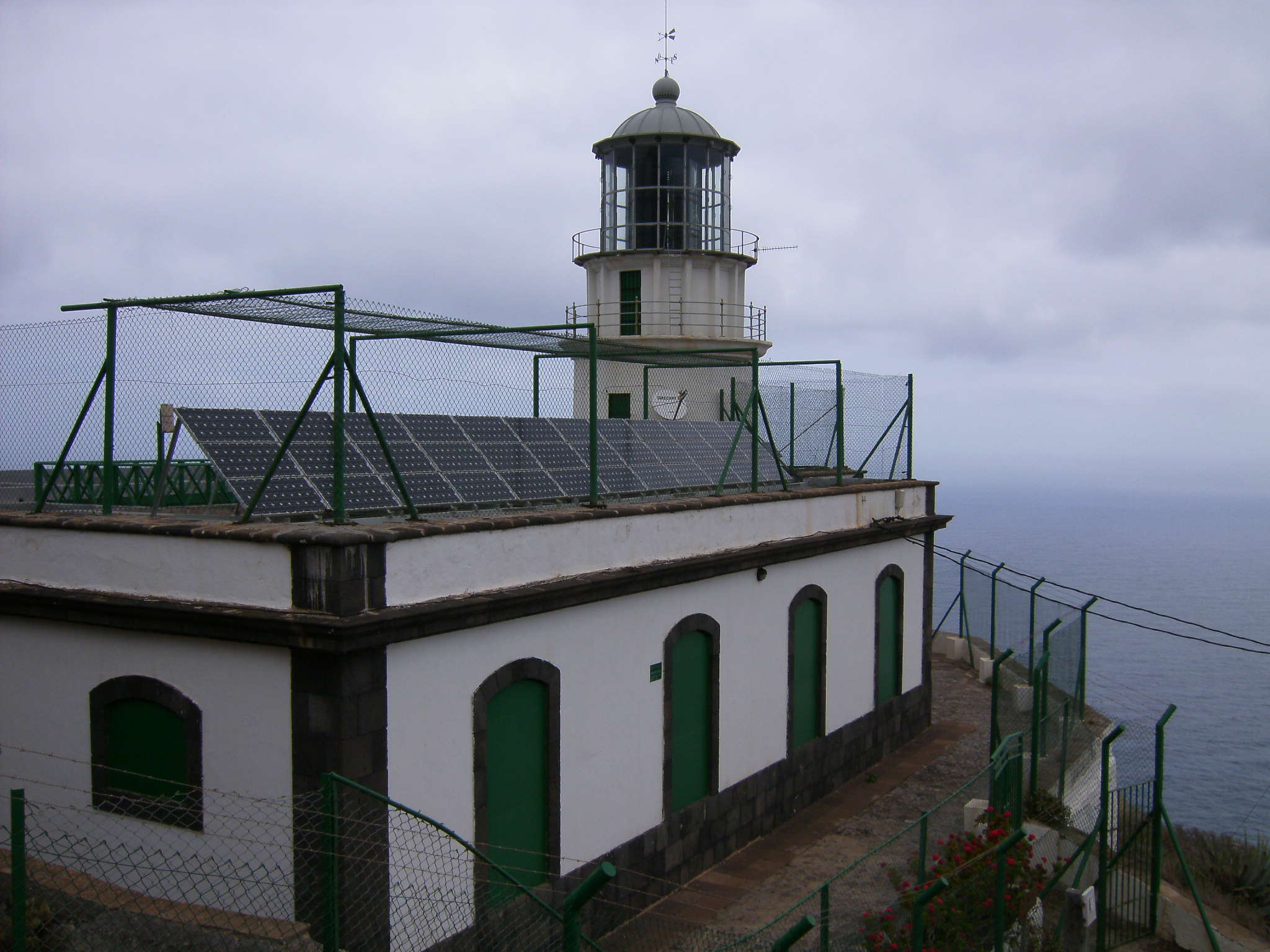
- Location: Anaga; Tenerife; Canary Islands; Spain
- Coordinates: 28.581328°N 16.140019°W

Tower
- Constructed: 1864
- Construction: stone tower
- Height: 12 metres (39 ft)
- Shape: cylindrical tower with balcony and lantern attached to 1-storey keeper's house
- Markings: unpainted tower, white lantern
- Power source: solar power

Light
- Focal height: 247 metres (810 ft)
- Lens: original 1st order Barbier & Fenestre Fresnel lens
- Range: 21 nautical miles (39 km; 24 mi)
- Characteristic: Fl (2+4) W 30s.
- Spain no.: ES-12630

The Punta de Anaga Lighthouse (Spanish: Faro Punta de Anaga) is an active lighthouse on the Canary island of Tenerife, in the municipality of Santa Cruz de Tenerife. Punta de Anaga is the most northerly point on the island, and is where the Anaga mountain range meets the sea.

It was originally proposed to construct a second order lighthouse on the Savage Islands, which lie 165 km north of Tenerife. But the sovereignty of the islands was an issue, so a first order light was commissioned at Punta de Anaga instead.

== History ==
Completed in 1864, it is one of the oldest lighthouses in the Canaries; Punta de Jandía on Gran Canaria was also opened in the same year.

Built in a similar style to other Canarian 19th century lights, it consists of a white washed single storey house, with dark volcanic rock used for the masonry detailing. A twelve metre high tower, with a twin gallery is attached to the seaward side of the house, facing the Atlantic Ocean.

The lighthouse still retains its original Fresnel lens, which was supplied by Barbier and Fenestre of Paris. With a focal height of 247 metres (810 ft) above the sea, its light can be seen for 21 nautical miles. The lighthouse is maintained by the port authority of the Province of Santa Cruz de Tenerife (Autoridad Portuaria de Santa Cruz de Tenerife), and is registered under the international Admiralty number D2820 and has the NGA identifier of 113–23852.

Map showing the principal lighthouses of Tenerife

== Geography and climate ==
Punta de Anaga has a hot semi-arid climate (Köppen: BSh; Trewartha: BSab) with an annual precipitation of only 242.1 millimetres (9.53 in) and no more than 62 days of precipitation.

Climate data for Punta de Anaga Climate ID: C449F; coordinates 28°30′29″N 16°11′44″W; elevation: 19 m (62 ft); 1991–2020 normals, extremes 2009–present
Month	Jan	Feb	Mar	Apr	May	Jun	Jul	Aug	Sep	Oct	Nov	Dec	Year
Record high °C (°F)	28.6 (83.5)	29.5 (85.1)	34.4 (93.9)	32.9 (91.2)	37.8 (100.0)	38.8 (101.8)	38.4 (101.1)	41.4 (106.5)	34.9 (94.8)	35.1 (95.2)	33.3 (91.9)	27.7 (81.9)	41.4 (106.5)
Mean daily maximum °C (°F)	21.2 (70.2)	21.0 (69.8)	21.8 (71.2)	22.6 (72.7)	24.1 (75.4)	25.8 (78.4)	27.8 (82.0)	29.0 (84.2)	28.1 (82.6)	26.7 (80.1)	24.1 (75.4)	22.5 (72.5)	24.6 (76.3)
Daily mean °C (°F)	18.1 (64.6)	18.1 (64.6)	18.7 (65.7)	19.7 (67.5)	21.2 (70.2)	22.9 (73.2)	24.7 (76.5)	25.8 (78.4)	25.1 (77.2)	23.6 (74.5)	21.2 (70.2)	19.5 (67.1)	21.6 (70.9)
Mean daily minimum °C (°F)	15.0 (59.0)	15.1 (59.2)	15.5 (59.9)	16.6 (61.9)	18.2 (64.8)	20.0 (68.0)	21.6 (70.9)	22.5 (72.5)	22.1 (71.8)	20.5 (68.9)	18.3 (64.9)	16.4 (61.5)	18.5 (65.3)
Record low °C (°F)	11.2 (52.2)	10.7 (51.3)	10.1 (50.2)	12.1 (53.8)	13.2 (55.8)	16.1 (61.0)	18.0 (64.4)	19.3 (66.7)	18.6 (65.5)	15.7 (60.3)	13.8 (56.8)	12.5 (54.5)	10.1 (50.2)
Average precipitation mm (inches)	22.0 (0.87)	38.7 (1.52)	22.4 (0.88)	15.0 (0.59)	3.1 (0.12)	2.3 (0.09)	0.9 (0.04)	6.6 (0.26)	2.1 (0.08)	33.6 (1.32)	58.2 (2.29)	37.2 (1.46)	242.1 (9.53)
Average precipitation days (≥ 0.1 mm)	7.30	8.70	7.22	6.00	3.60	2.00	0.83	1.60	1.91	5.55	10.08	6.73	61.52
Average relative humidity (%)	64	64	64	64	62	62	60	59	65	66	67	66	64
Source: State Meteorological Agency/AEMET OpenData

== See also ==
- List of lighthouses in Spain
- List of lighthouses in the Canary Islands
