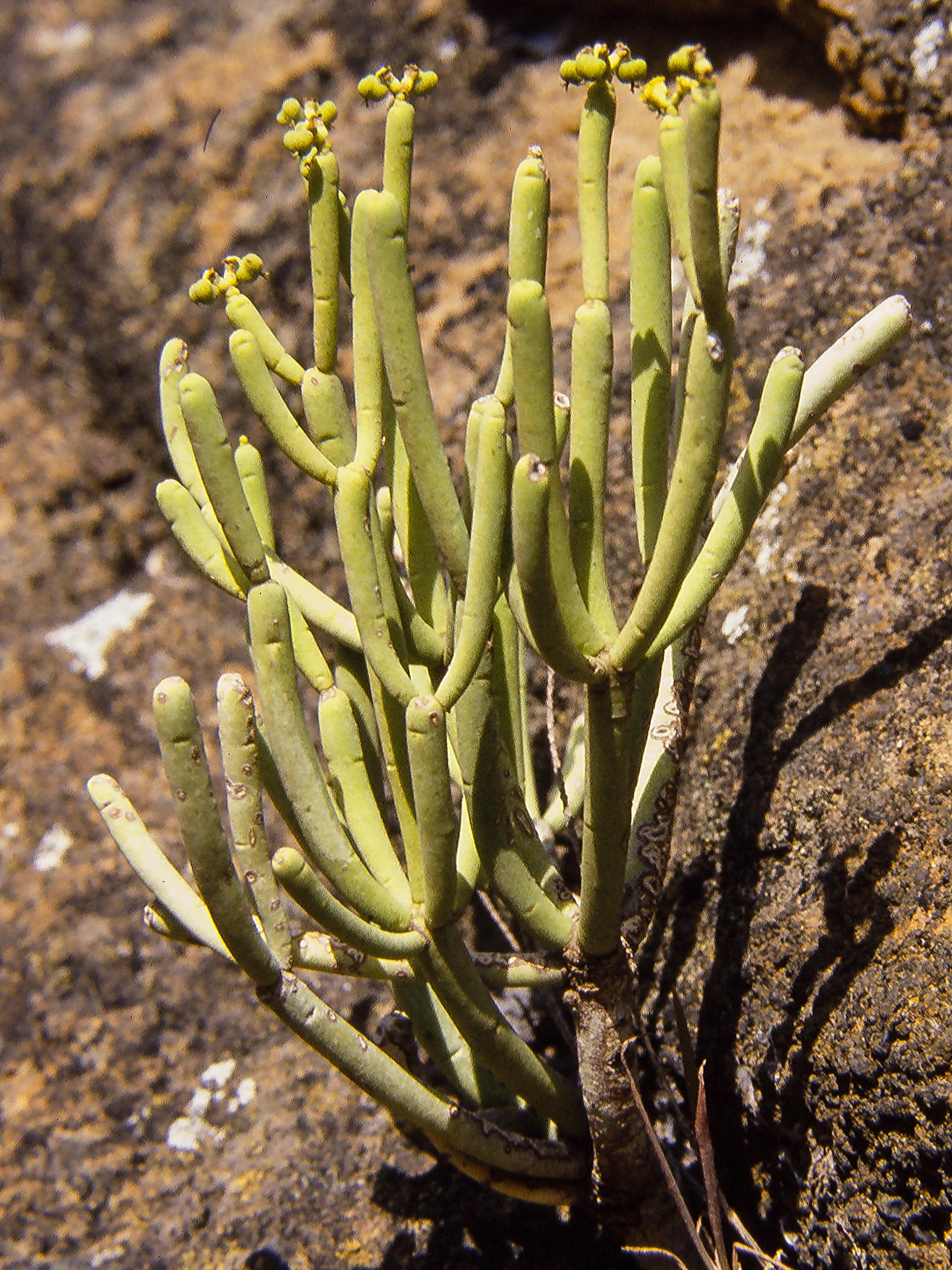
- In habitat, Teno, Tenerife
- CITES Appendix II

Scientific classification
- Kingdom: Plantae
- Clade: Tracheophytes
- Clade: Angiosperms
- Clade: Eudicots
- Clade: Rosids
- Order: Malpighiales
- Family: Euphorbiaceae
- Genus: Euphorbia
- Species: E. aphylla

Binomial name
- Euphorbia aphylla Brouss. ex Willd.

Synonyms
- Tirucalia aphylla (Brouss. ex Willd.) P.V.Heath; Tithymalus aphyllus (Brouss. ex Willd.) Klotzsch & Garcke

= Euphorbia aphylla =

Species of flowering plant

Euphorbia aphylla is a species of flowering plant in the family Euphorbiaceae. It is native to the Canary Islands. It was first described in 1809.

== Description ==
Euphorbia aphylla is a short shrub growing up to about 50 cm (20 in). It has slender leafless stems. The virtually stemless flowers are produced in small clusters at the end of the stems. Very small light brown or reddish fruits enclose small brown seeds.

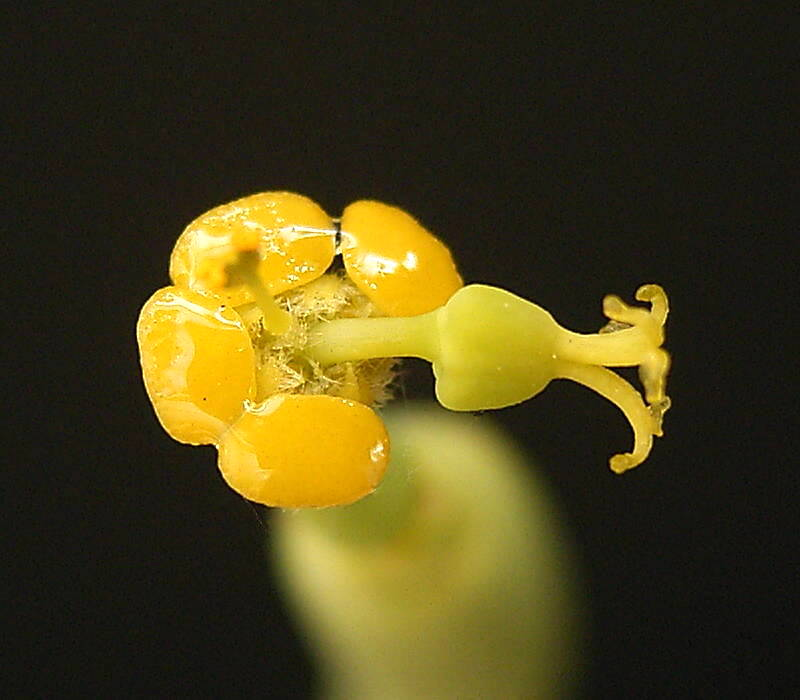
Flower

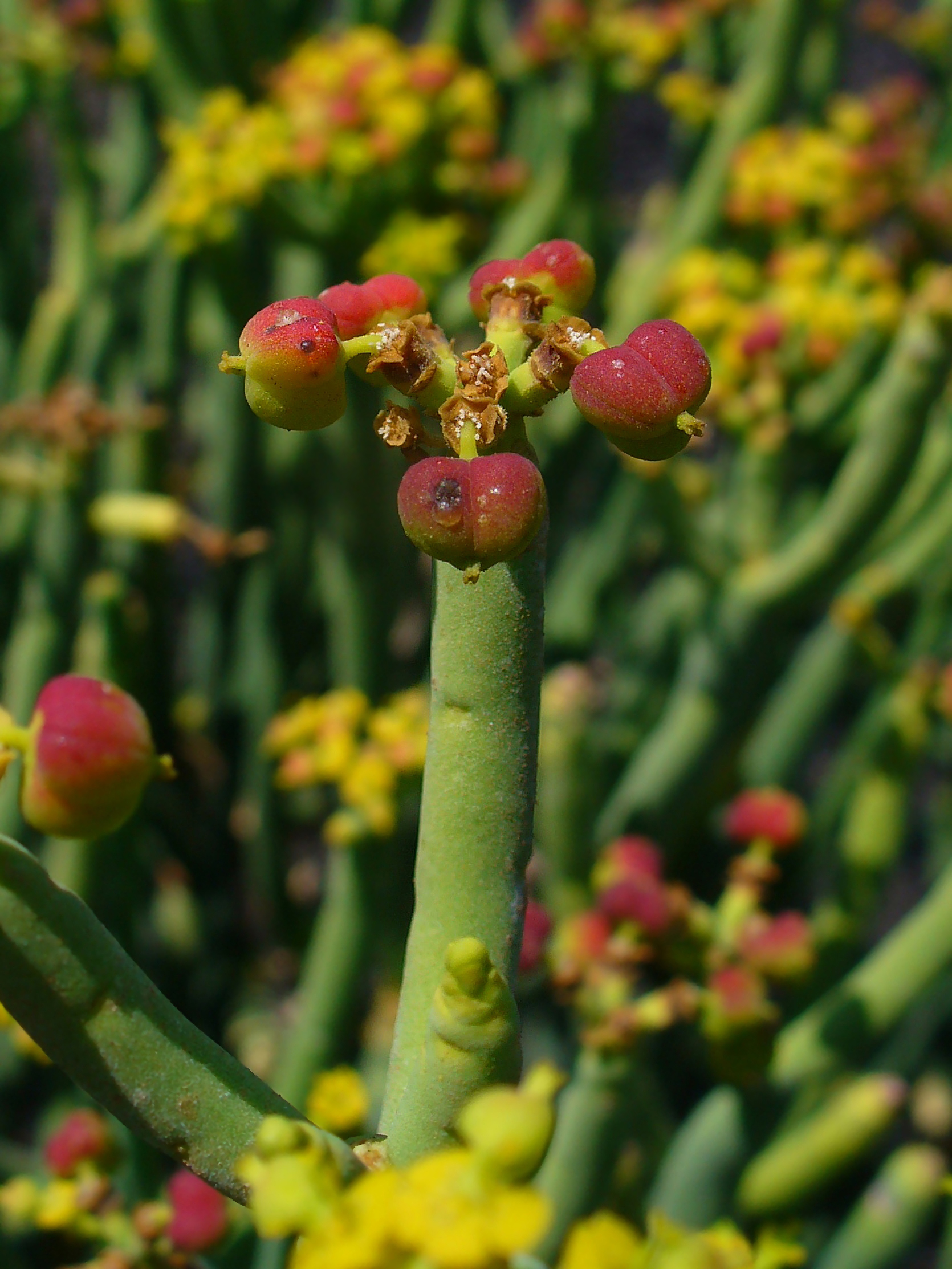
Fruit

== Distribution and habitat ==
Euphorbia aphylla growing in Gran Canaria

Euphorbia aphylla is native to the Canary Islands. It is found on the north coast of Gran Canaria, being locally frequent near the sea. In Tenerife, it is also coastal, occurring in the north west and the south of the island. It also occurs in La Gomera. It is a halophyte, found on coastal rocks and slopes facing the sea at elevations up to 150 m (490 ft).
