= Fuencaliente Lighthouse =

Lighthouse on La Palma, Spain

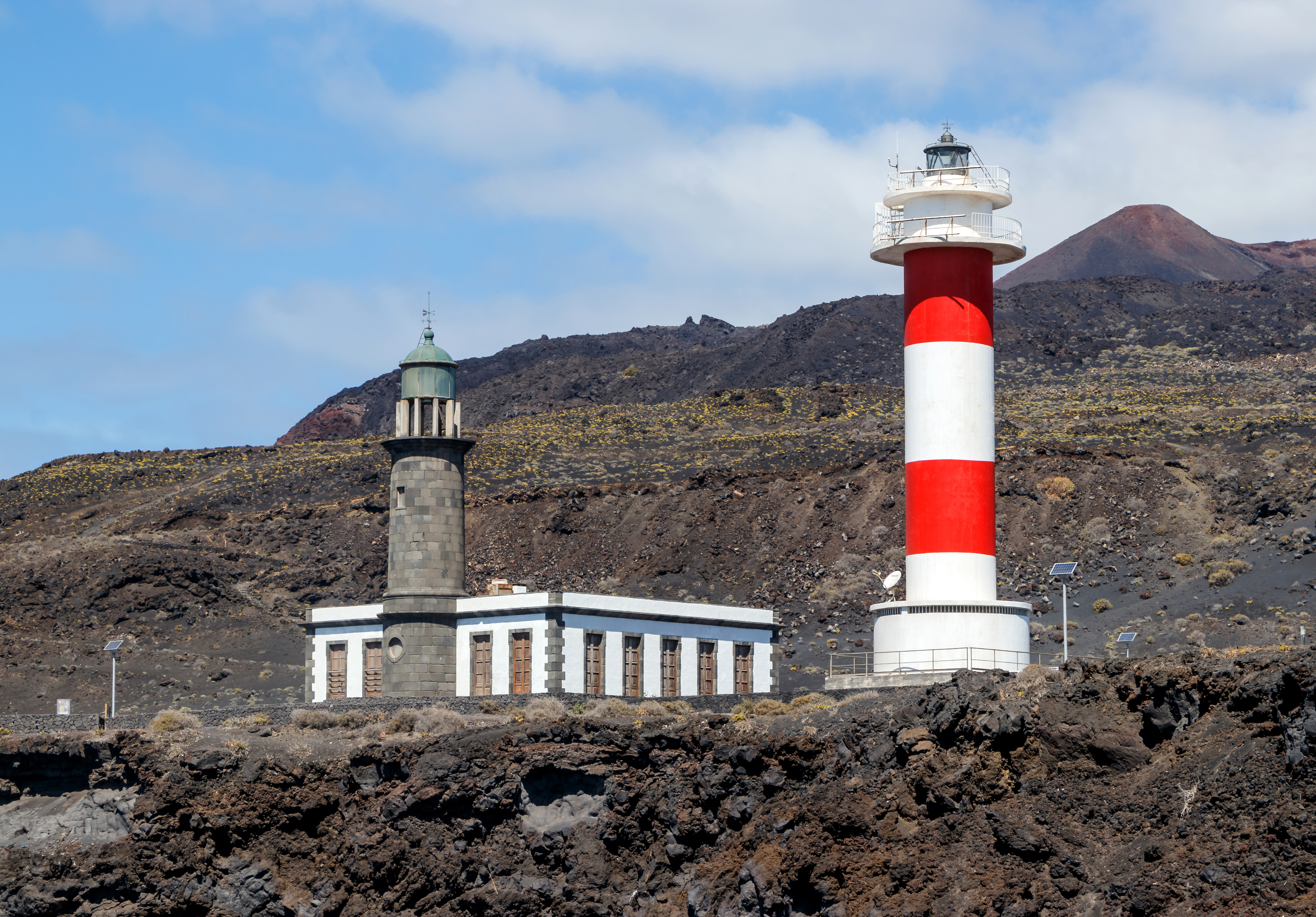
- The first and the current lighthouses
- Location: Fuencaliente de La Palma; La Palma; Canary Islands; Spain
- Coordinates: 28°27′19″N 17°50′35″W

Tower
- Constructed: 1903 (first)
- Construction: concrete tower (current) stone tower (first)
- Height: 24 metres (79 ft) (current); 12 metres (39 ft) (first)
- Shape: cylindrical tower with double balcony and lantern (current) cylindrical tower rising from 1-storey keeper's house (first)
- Markings: white tower with two red bands, white lantern (current) unpainted tower
- Operator: Autoridad Portuaria de Santa Cruz de Tenerife

Light
- First lit: 1985 (current)
- Deactivated: 1985 (first)
- Focal height: 36 metres (118 ft) (current)
- Range: 14 nautical miles (26 km; 16 mi)
- Characteristic: Fl (3) W 18s.
- Spain no.: ES-13030

The Fuencaliente Lighthouse is an active lighthouse at the southern end of the island of La Palma in the Canary Islands. The original lighthouse was built in 1903 and while it still exists it was replaced by the current lighthouse in 1985. It is one of a number of lighthouses in the Canary Islands.

== Location ==
The lighthouses are located at the southern end of La Palma, around 13 kilometres (8.1 mi) south of Los Canarios. It is accessible by road, and whilst the tower is closed the site is open with parking spaces. It is adjacent to the Salinas de Fuencaliente and the village of El Faro.

== 1903 lighthouse ==
The construction of the original lighthouse started in 1882. It was built with stone imported from Arucas, Las Palmas, with construction ending around 1898, before it entered service in 1903. It consists of a 12 metres (39 ft) cylindrical tower at the front of a single level keeper's house, both made of stone. The original light flashed three times in a sequence, lit by an oil lamp. It was badly damaged by an earthquake in 1939 and had to be substantially rebuilt, with the tower demolished and rebuilt with concrete. The light was temporarily replaced with an acetylene light, which subsequently became permanent, and emitted a single flash every 6 seconds, with a 15 miles (24 km) range. The keep's house was abandoned and subsequently fell into ruin, with its decay hastened by earthquakes from the San Antonio volcano. The lighthouse closed in 1985, and its lantern was removed at the time. It is Amateur Radio Lighthouse Society number CAI-083.

It was replaced with a new lighthouse that was built next to it, but the building and tower were conserved. Restoration started in May 2001 and finished in 2004, with a new lantern installed. An interpretation centre for the marine reserve on the island (Centro de Interpretación de la Reserva Marina de la Isla de La Palma) is now located in the keeper's house, which opened in 2006. The main room has been recreated as a volcanic cave with on a raised glass floor. A full scale bronze sculpture of a dolphin is displayed, caught in a fishing net suspended from the ceiling.

== 1985 lighthouse ==
The new lighthouse started construction in 1983 and started operation in 1985. It is a 24 metres (79 ft) cylindrical concrete tower, with a double gallery and lantern. It is painted white, with two red bands. It has a focal plane that is 36 metres (118 ft) above sea level and emits three white flashes every 18 seconds. Its IDs are ARLHS CAI-037; ES-13030; Admiralty D2850; NGA 23800. Its light can be seen for 14 nautical miles.

== Memorial place ==
During the trip to Brazil, on 15 July 1570 while sailing near the Canary Islands, the Santiago, the ship of Inácio de Azevedo and 39 Jesuits was attacked and captured by a fleet led by French Huguenot corsair Jacques de Sores off Fuencaliente Lighthouse. Following the capture, Azevedo and his 39 companions were massacred. In 1971 40 concrete crosses at the place of martyrdom for the Forty Martyrs of Brazil, about 200 off the Fuencaliente lighthouse were placed on the seabed by the government of the island La Palma. This place is situated in a depth of about 20 meters and is today a popular diving destination. Adjacent to the old tower, another monument for the Forty Martyrs of Brazil was erected in October 2014. This monument is a stone cross, with a plate on which the names of the martyrs are engraved.

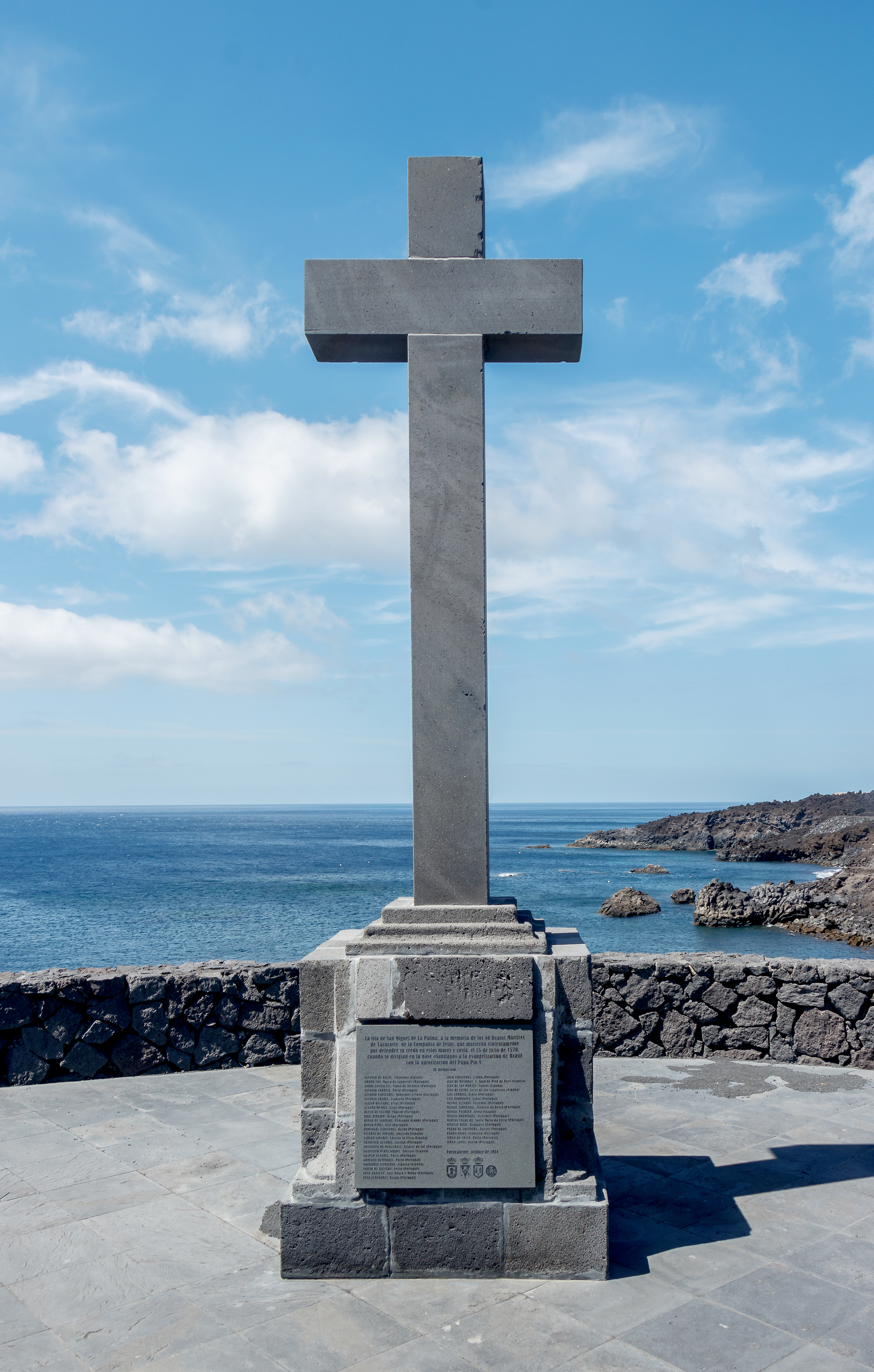
Memorial
"A los Jesuitas"

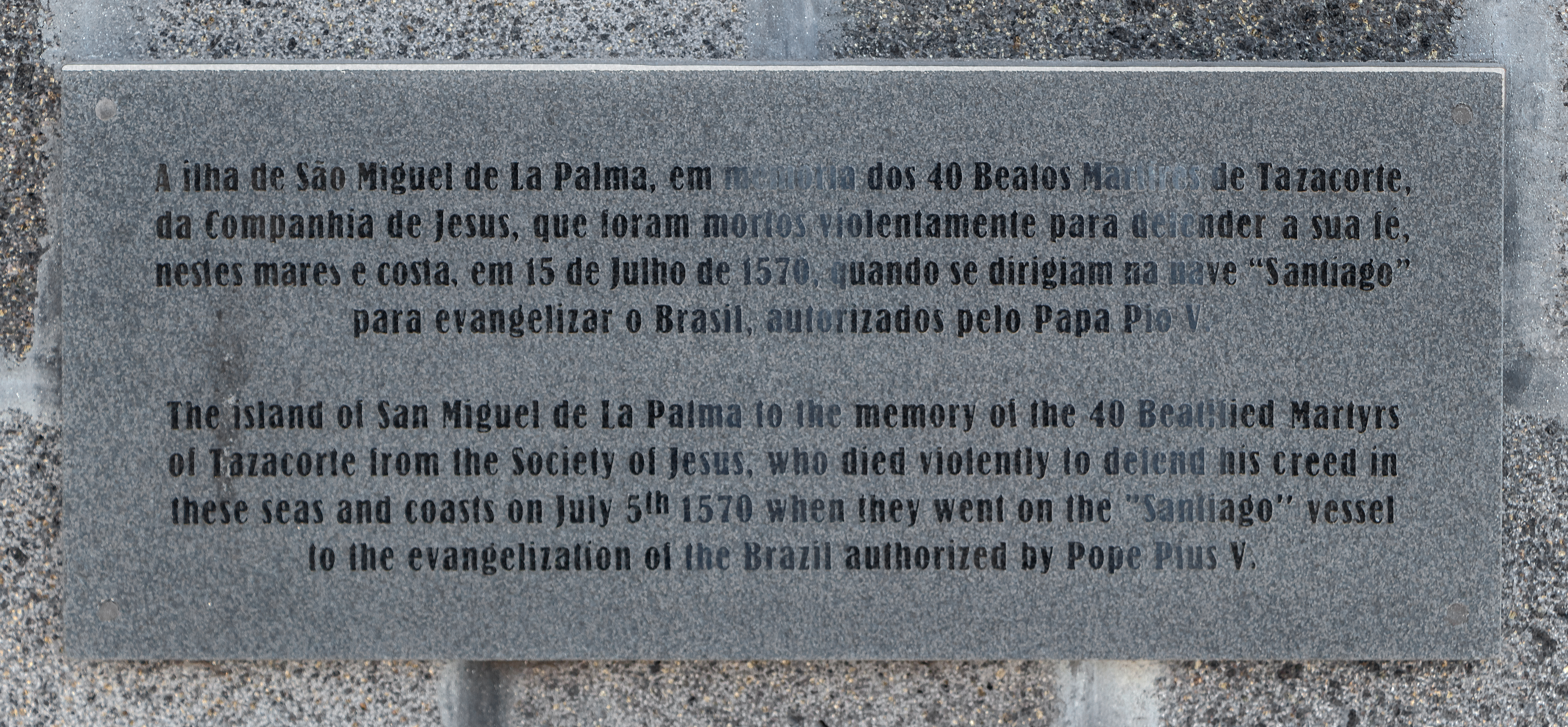
Plaque on the west side

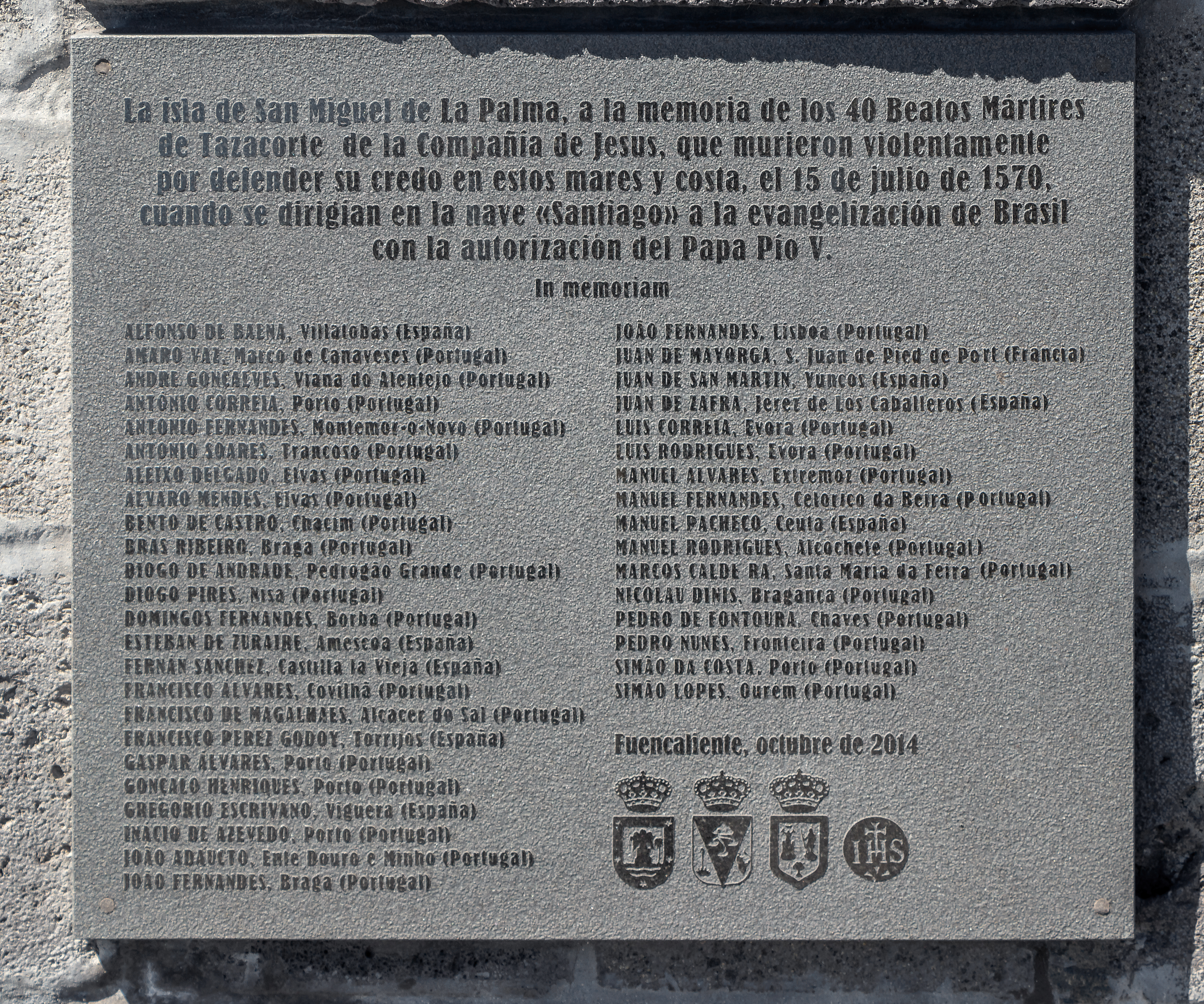
Plaque on the east side
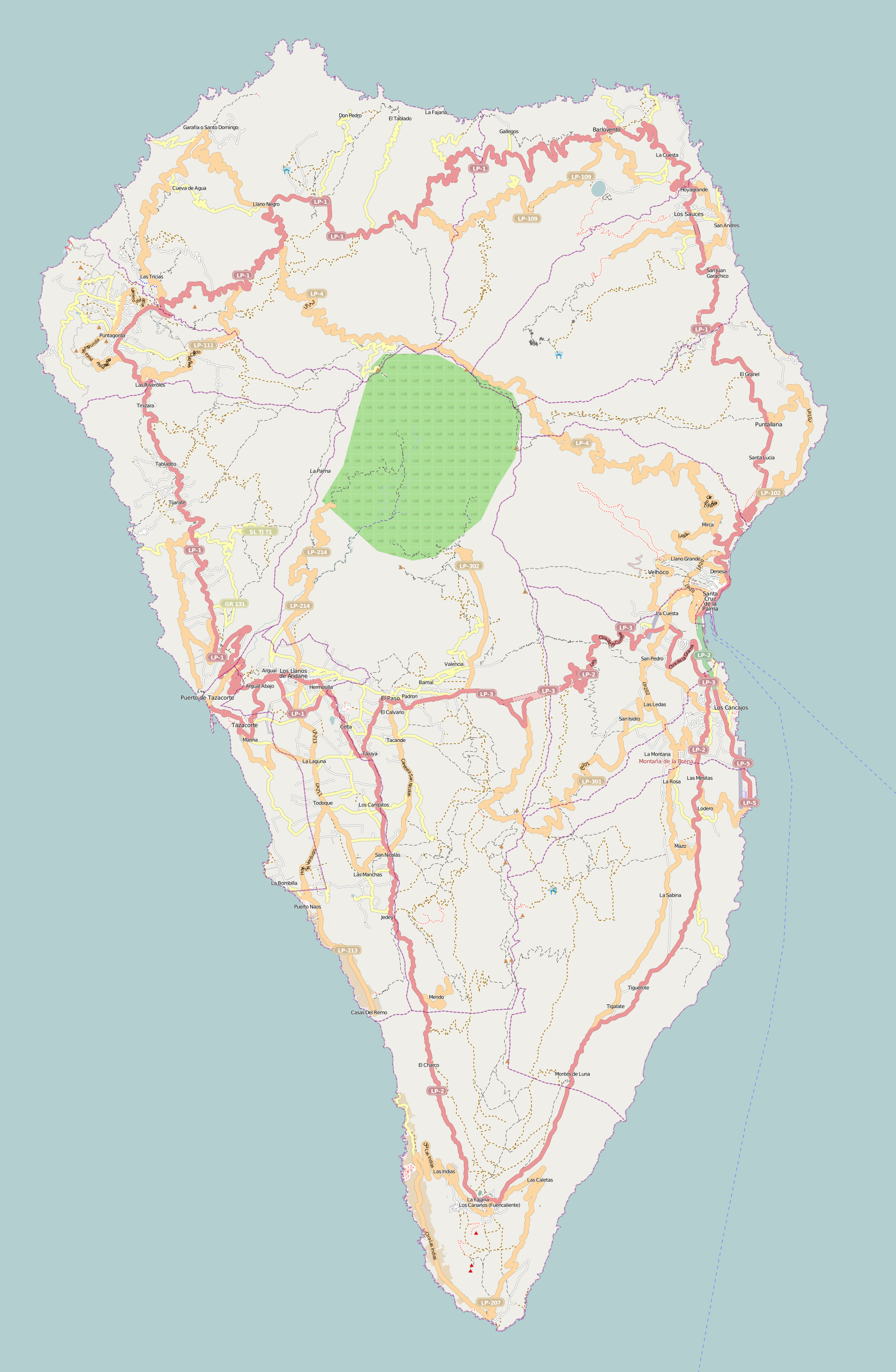
Map showing the principal lighthouses of La Palma
