= Los Silos =

- Municipality and town
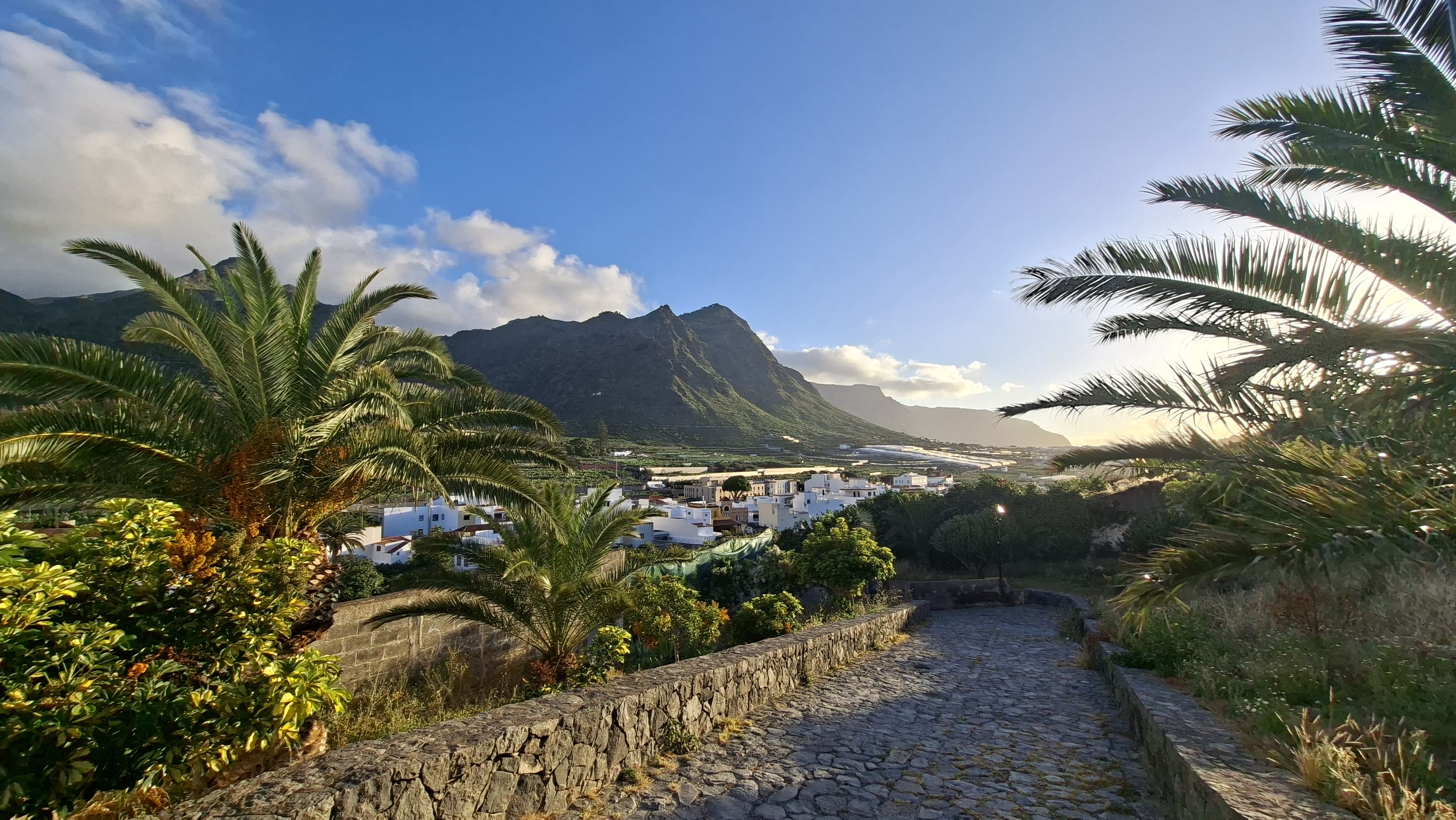

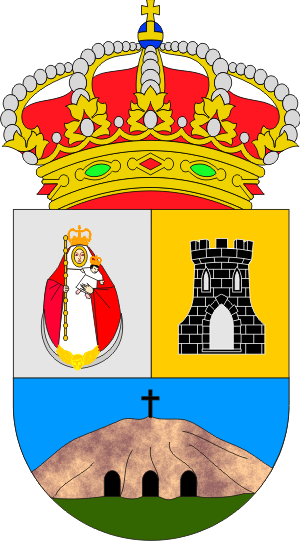
- Flag Coat of arms

- Municipal location in Tenerife

- Location in Province of Santa Cruz de Tenerife Los Silos (Canary Islands) Los Silos (Spain, Canary Islands)
- Coordinates: 28°21′56″N 16°48′59″W
- Country: Spain
- Autonomous Region: Canary Islands
- Province: Santa Cruz de Tenerife
- Island: Tenerife

Area
  - Total: 24.23 km^{2} (9.36 sq mi)

Population (2025-01-01)
  - Total: 4,773
  - Density: 197.0/km^{2} (510.2/sq mi)
- Time zone: UTC+0 (GMT)
- Post code: 38042
- Climate: BSh
- Website: www.lossilos.es

Los Silos is a municipality and town in the northwestern part of the island Tenerife, Canary Islands, Spain. It is located on the north coast, 57 km West of the capital Santa Cruz de Tenerife.

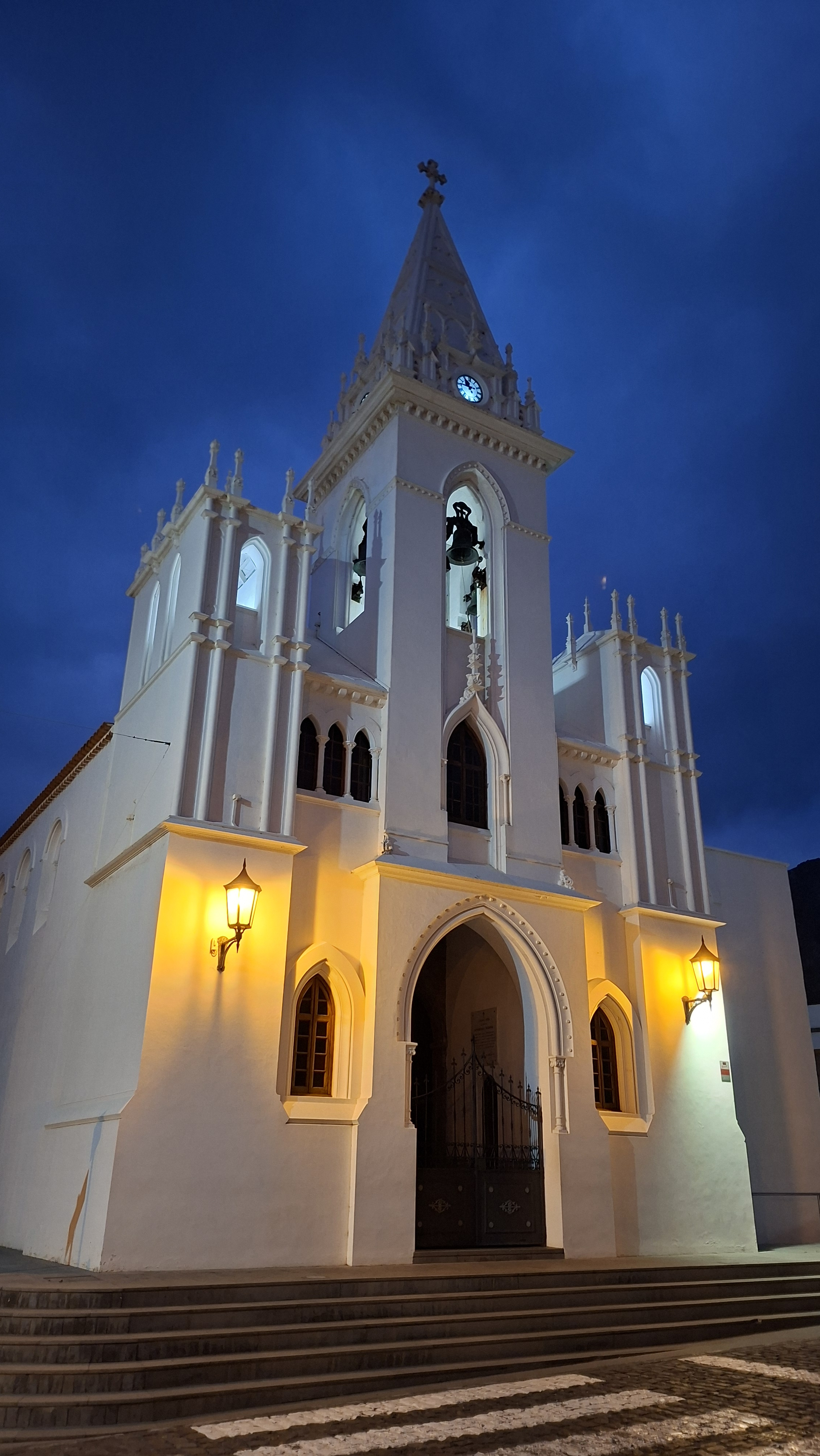
Iglesia de Nuestra Señora de La Luz

Its name first appears in 1509, when the agricultural activity of the region made necessary the construction of silos to store cereals. The town located at the heart of the Teno Massif, contains an extremely valuable and interesting wealth of plant and animal life. The leafy laurisilva woodlands are in stark contrast with the plains on the coast, which still hold small areas of cardones and tabaibas, furrowed by steep-sided ravines which are routes bringing together the highlands and the coast.

Among the plant formations, the most notable is the cardonal–tabaibal which occupies the lower parts of the district, practically from sea level up to the old coastal cliffs. The cliffs separate the sector of the oldest Isla Baja from the Monte Verde, a woodland with great water needs whose existence depends on additional moisture from the sea of clouds brought to the island on the Trade Winds. The Monte del Agua is, together with the mountains of Anaga, the main representation on the island of Tenerife of the Canarian Monte Verde and is still relatively well-conserved as a result of the steepness of the terrain, furrowed by a large number of deep ravines. The forest in this terrain shelters one of the best populations of the endemic white-tailed laurel pigeon and Bolle's laurel pigeon. For these reasons, a large part of the municipal territory is included within the Canarian network of Protected Natural Spaces including the Parque Rural de Teno, Site of Special Scientific Interest and the los Acantilados de La Culata Protected Landscape. All of this landscape is criss-crossed by footpaths delimited by dry-stone walls, which past generations for many years created and embellished even cobbling the steepest parts so as to enable animals shod with horseshoes and beasts of burden to obtain a better grip. Now, with the passage of time, these old footpaths have been recovered.
