= Servatur Hotels =

Spanish hotel chain

Servatur Hotels & Resorts
- Company type: Hospitality
- Industry: Tourism industry
- Founded: 1976
- Headquarters: Mogán, Gran Canaria
- Number of employees: >1500

Servatur Hotels & Resorts is a Spanish hotel chain based in Gran Canaria, founded in the 1976. The company's business is focused on the holiday hotel sector and currently only operates hotels in Gran Canaria.

Servatur operate ten hotels and apartment complexes on the island.

== Hotels & locations ==
| Hotel | Location | Star / key rating | Rooms |
|---|---|---|---|
| Servatur Casablanca | Puerto Rico de Gran Canaria | 4 | 97 |
| Servatur Puerto Azul | Puerto Rico de Gran Canaria | 4 | 385 |
| Servatur Waikiki | Playa del Inglés | 4 | 511 |
| Servatur Terrazamar & Sun Suite | Puerto Rico de Gran Canaria | 3 | 48 |
| Servatur Green Beach | Arguineguín | 3 | 232 |
| Servatur Montebello | Puerto Rico de Gran Canaria | 2 | 113 |
| Servatur Barbados | Playa del Inglés | 2 | 91 |
| IG Nachosol Atlantic & Yaizasol by Servatur | Puerto Rico de Gran Canaria | 4 | 69 |
| IG Nachosol Premium by Servatur | Puerto Rico de Gran Canaria | 4 | 16 |
| Arguineguín Park by Servatur | Arguineguín | 4 | 263 |
