= Punta del Castillete Lighthouse =

Lighthouse on Gran Canaria, Spain

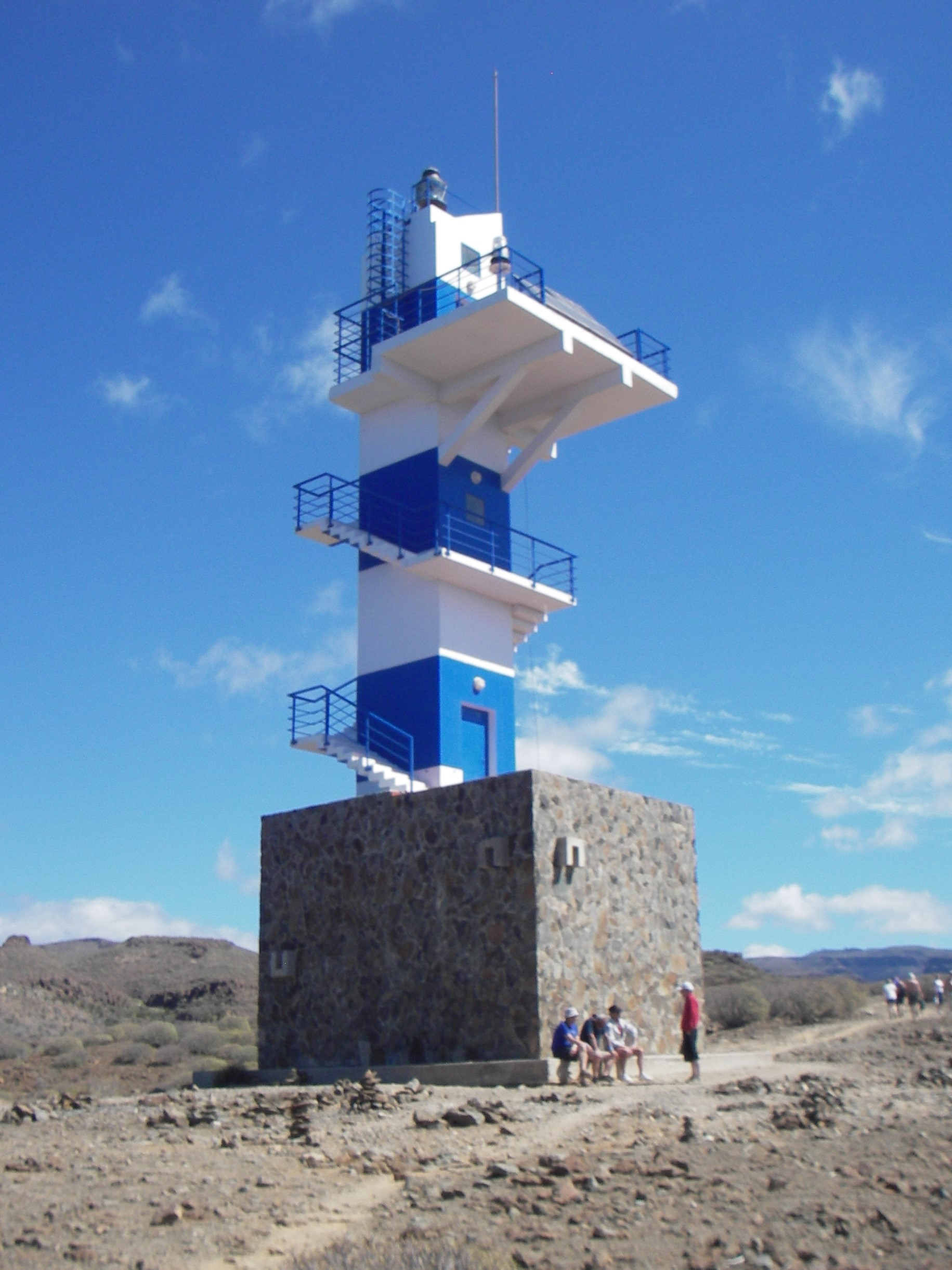
- Location: Puerto de Mogán; Gran Canaria; Canary Islands; Spain
- Coordinates: 27.819351°N 15.768459°W

Tower
- Constructed: 1996
- Automated: 1996
- Height: 21 metres (69 ft)
- Shape: square tower with external stairs
- Markings: tower with blue and white bands
- Operator: Autoridad Portuaria de Las Palmas de Gran Canaria

Light
- Focal height: 114 metres (374 ft)
- Range: 17 nautical miles (31 km; 20 mi)
- Characteristic: Fl W 5s.
- Spain no.: ES-12607

The Punta del Castillete Lighthouse (Spanish: Faro de Punta del Castillete) is an active lighthouse on the Canary island of Gran Canaria. It is located on cliffs above the resort and fishing harbour of Puerto de Mogán, in the municipality of Mogán. Punta Castillete is on the south-western side of the island facing the Atlantic Ocean, and lies between Maspalomas Lighthouse to the south and the lighthouse of Punta Sardina to the north.

== History ==
The lighthouse was constructed between 1985 and 1995, and first entered service in March 1996. The modern design, which has been called "ungainly", consists of a square base faced with dark volcanic rock, supporting a concrete tower with external stairways leading to a cantilevered gallery. Originally painted a sandy yellow colour, it was repainted in blue and white in 2014.

The lighthouse is not connected to the electricity grid, but instead is powered by six solar panels charging a set of batteries. The 500 mm lantern is equipped with a 150 watt halogen lamp, producing a white light. With a focal height of 114 m above sea level, its light can be seen for 17 nautical miles.

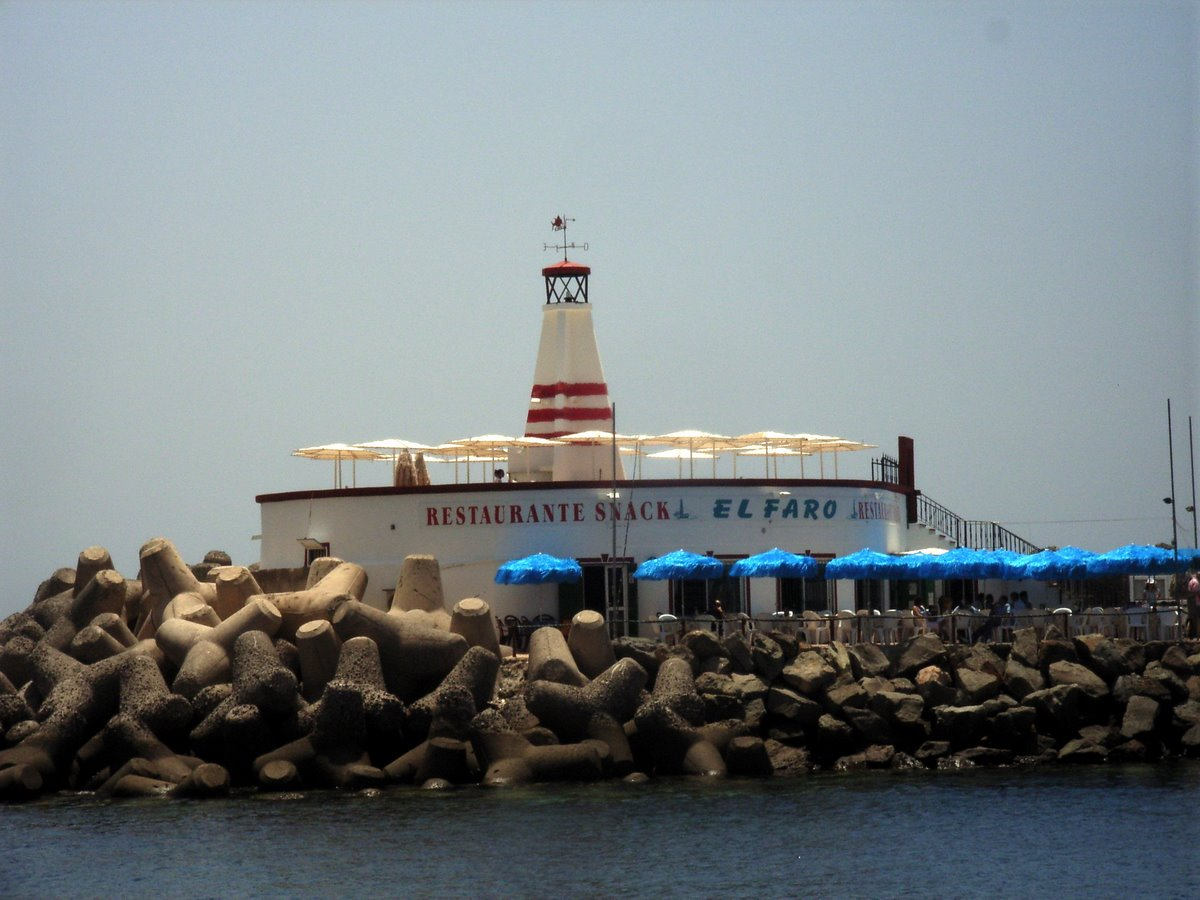
El Faro restaurant and Puerto de Mogán breakwater light

The area around the lighthouse is accessible following a steep climb via a road with many hairpin turns from the resort of Puerto de Mogán, although the tower itself is closed.

== Puerto de Mogán ==
The nearby harbour in Puerto de Mogán has two smaller aids to navigation, which mark the entrance to the port and marina. On the main breakwater is a light mounted on a tower above the centre of the El Faro restaurant. Painted white with red bands, the lantern on the 6 m tower emits a flashing red light.

On the opposite side of the entrance, next to the hotel is a beacon 2 m high, that shows a flashing green light.

Map showing the principal lighthouses of Gran Canaria

== See also ==
- List of lighthouses in Spain
- List of lighthouses in the Canary Islands
