= Punta de Melenara Lighthouse =

Lighthouse on Gran Canaria, Spain

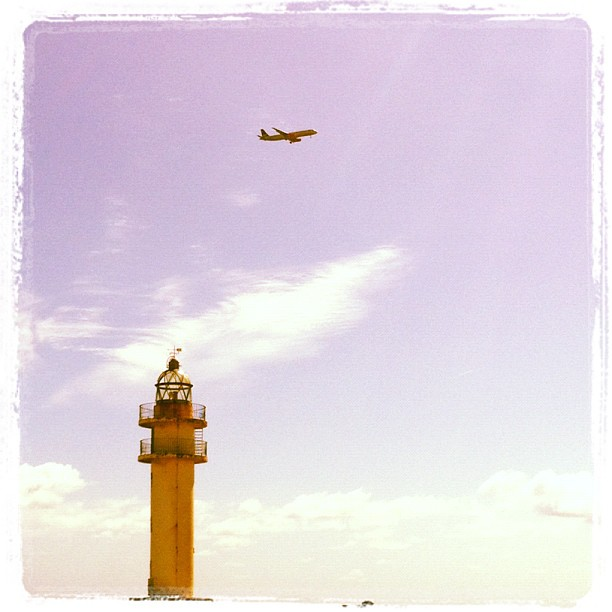
- The lighthouse in 2012
- Location: Telde; Gran Canaria; Canary Islands; Spain
- Coordinates: 27.99177°N 15.36792°W

Tower
- Constructed: 1992
- Construction: masonry tower
- Height: 17 metres (56 ft)
- Shape: cylindrical tower with double balcony and lantern
- Markings: white tower, glass lantern
- Power source: mains electricity
- Operator: Autoridad Portuaria de Las Palmas de Gran Canaria

Light
- Focal height: 33 metres (108 ft)
- Range: 12 nautical miles (22 km; 14 mi)
- Characteristic: Fl (2) W 10s.
- Spain no.: ES-12455

The Punta de Melenara Lighthouse (Spanish: Faro de Punta de Melenara) also known as the Faro de Taliarte is an active 20th century lighthouse on the Spanish island of Gran Canaria in the Canary Islands.

The lighthouse has been constructed on Melenara Point, a rocky headland between the beaches of Playa del Hombre and Playa de Melenara, which lies next to the settlement of Taliarte and its port, in the municipality of Telde. Located on the eastern side of the island, the Punta de Melenara light marks the coastline between the La Isleta lighthouse of Las Palmas to the north and the Punta de Arinaga lighthouse to the south.

== Description ==
The lighthouse first entered service in 1992, as part of the third maritime lighting plan for the Canaries. Other lighthouses that were built as part of the same plan include Punta Lava and Arenas Blancas on La Palma, Morro Jable on Fuerteventura, and Punta del Castillete lighthouse also on Gran Canaria.

Similar in design to some of the other lighthouses in the Canaries, it consists of a 17 m high cylinder-shaped tower, which is white in colour, this supports twin galleries and a lantern with a glass cupola, topped with a wind vane.

The optics are made up of a 250 mm (fourth order) lens, equipped with a 1000 watt halogen lamp, which is connected to mains electricity and a back-up battery system. With a focal height of 33 m above sea level, the light can be seen for 12 nautical miles.

Its light characteristic is made up of a pattern of two flashes every twelve seconds., with the lantern emitting both red and white light, depending on direction The red flashes can be seen by mariners travelling north, and the white for those going south.

The lighthouse is operated in a semi-automatic way, receiving periodic visits from technicians from the maritime signals team of the Port Authority of Las Palmas. It is registered under the international Admiralty number D2807.5 and has the NGA identifier of 113–23990.

Map showing the principal lighthouses of Gran Canaria

== See also ==
- List of lighthouses in Spain
- List of lighthouses in the Canary Islands
