= Arguineguín =

Town in Gran Canaria, Spain

Coordinates: 27°45′44″N 15°41′01″W

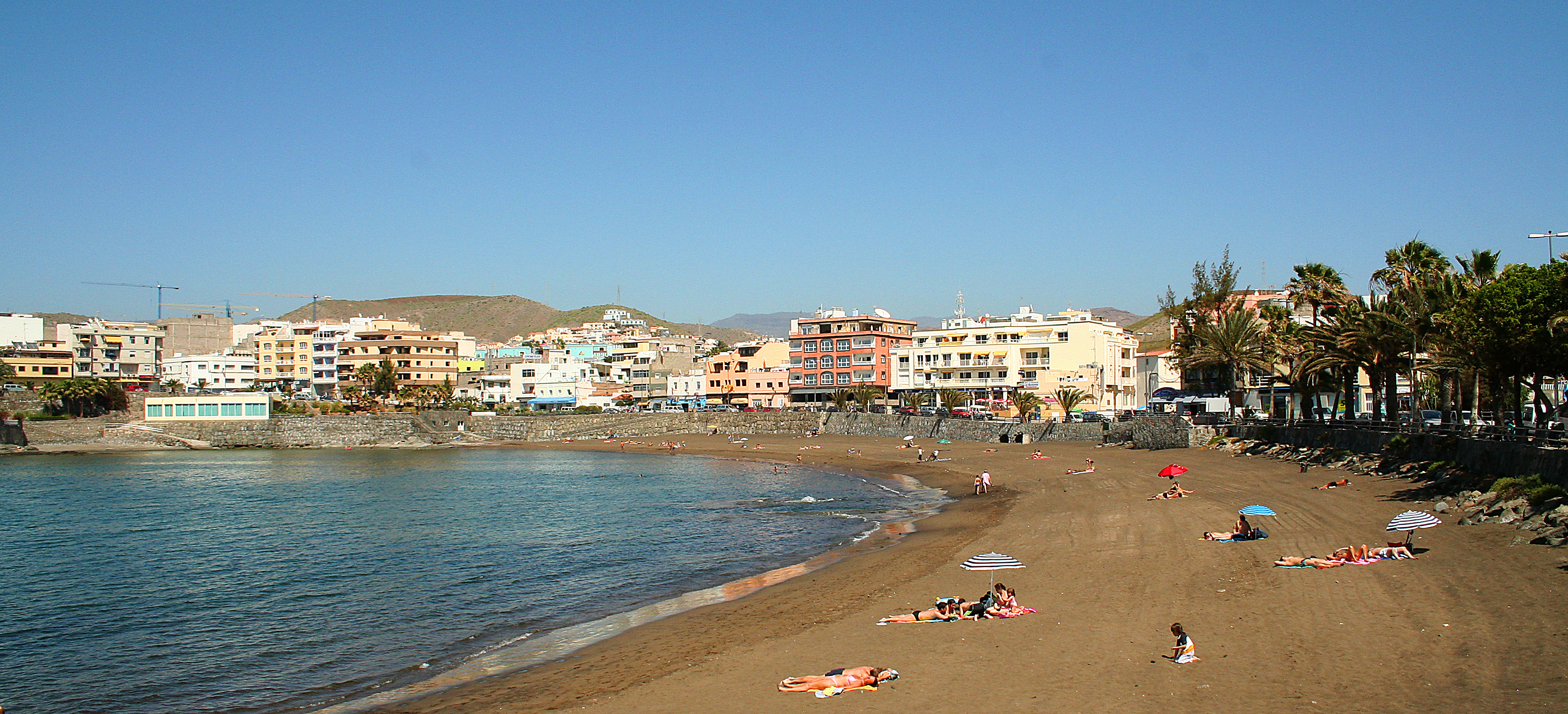
Playa de Arguineguín was upgraded with new sand in autumn 2004

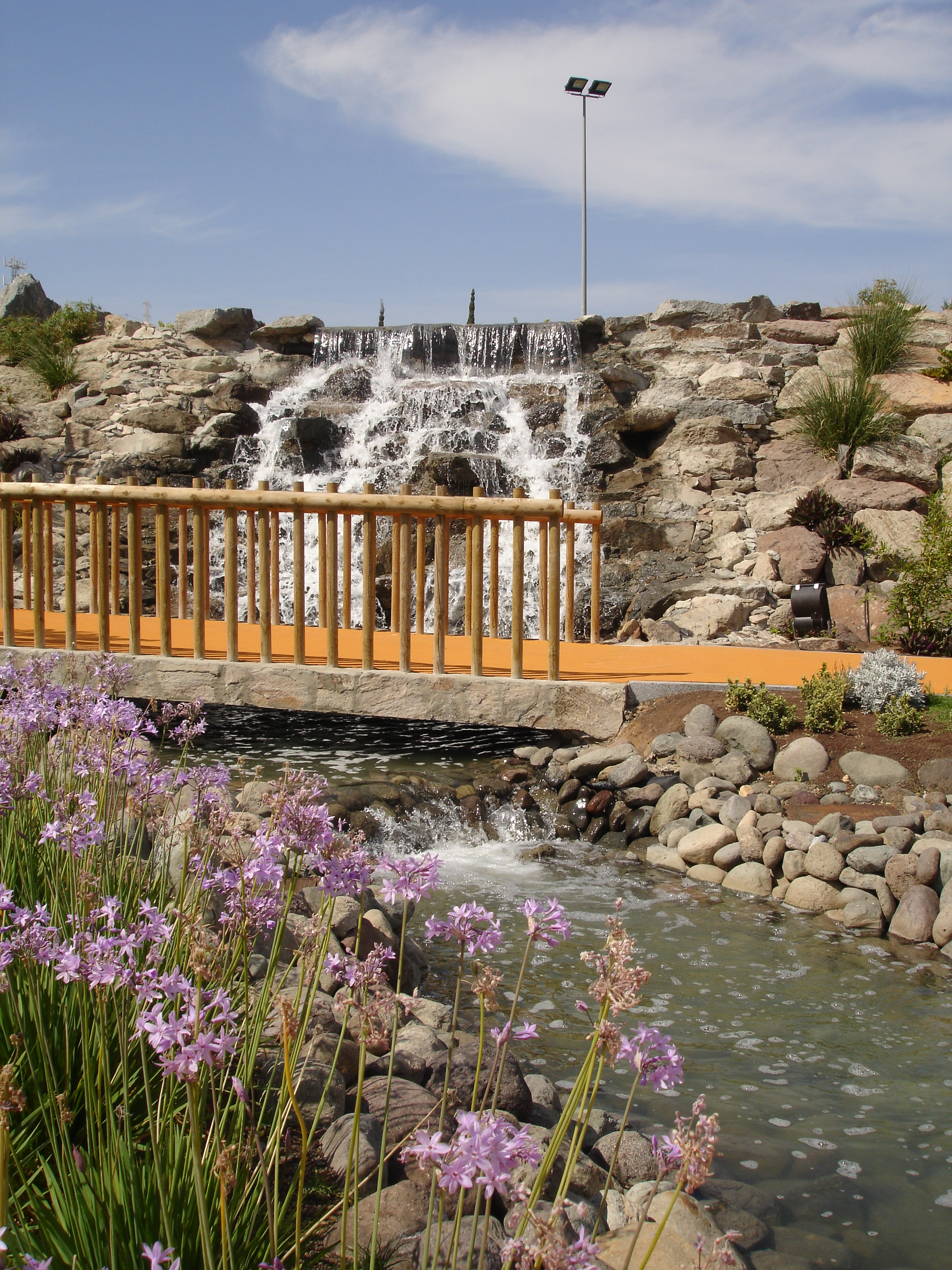
Parque Arguineguín was opened in April 2006

Arguineguín (Guanche for "quiet water") is one of the most populated towns along the south coast of Gran Canaria, Spain. A once typical Canarian fishing village, it is now home to both locals and tourists, as the settlement has continued to grow. In 2015 it had 2517 inhabitants. It is part of the municipality of Mogán and is located southwest of Las Palmas.

There are several bars and restaurants, the latter specialising in fresh fish caught the same day. Tuesday is market day (the largest on the island). Arguineguín features a beach and a port. Tourism is not as popular in Arguineguín as in the larger places as Maspalomas and Playa del Ingles. Holiday hotels, however, can be found in Arguineguín; Marino I, Dorado Beach, Club Puerto Atlantico, Sunwing Resort Arguineguín, Green Beach Hotel and Radisson Blu Resort to mention the larger ones.

From September to December 2020, the dock at Arguineguín was used as a Refugee transit camp for refugees fleeing on the Western African route.

== Transportation ==
The harbour here hosts a ferry service to Puerto Rico de Gran Canaria and Puerto de Mogán whilst another popular way to reach the town from Puerto Rico de Gran Canaria is by trekking over the mountain between the two towns.

The town also lies on several public bus routes offering convenient service to other towns on the island.

Arguineguín is also served by an expressway (GC1) with a nearby interchange and a highway.

== Etymology ==
The name of Arguineguín is of uncertain origin although, being one of the first toponyms reflected in Le Canarien, along with Telde or Agüimes, it seems to be of pre-Hispanic origin, having similarity with other toponyms located in the African continent, appearing Sebja Aguineiguín and the coast of Arguin, possibly all of Berber origin.

Another theory establishes a relationship with the Basque language through the Basque fishermen who sailed the Atlantic in times before the Castilian conquest of Gran Canaria, given that "argi" (light) and "egin" (to do) are words from that language.

== History ==
In ancient times, the entire area that is now less than 7 km from the current town was known as Arguineguín, which is why it is said that a small number of Canarian aborigines lived in Arguineguín, on the current Triana beach, about 3 km from Pajar, municipality of San Bartolomé de Tirajana.

== Notable people ==
- Juan Carlos Valerón, international footballer
- David Silva, international footballer
- Aythami Artiles, international footballer
- Tara Pacheco female sailor athlete
