= Punta Sardina Lighthouse =

Lighthouse on Gran Canaria, Spain

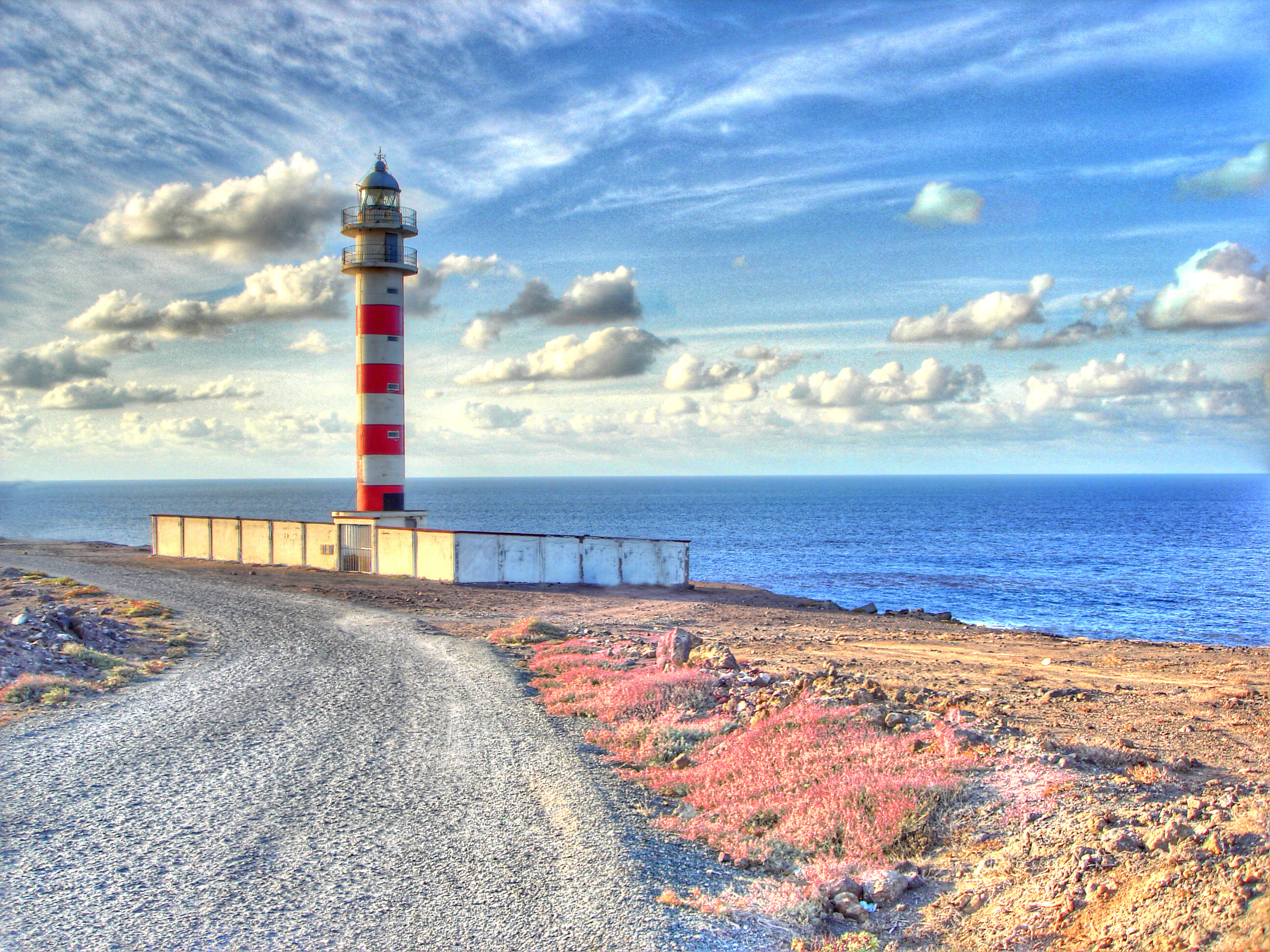
- The lighthouse in 2006
- Location: Gáldar; Gran Canaria; Canary Islands; Spain
- Coordinates: 28.164712°N 15.707848°W

Tower
- Constructed: 1891 (first)
- Construction: masonry tower
- Height: 24 metres (79 ft)
- Shape: cylindrical tower with double balcony and lantern
- Markings: tower with red and white bands, grey metallic lantern dome
- Operator: Autoridad Portuaria de Las Palmas de Gran Canaria

Light
- First lit: 1985 (current)
- Focal height: 47 metres (154 ft)
- Range: 20 nautical miles (37 km; 23 mi)
- Characteristic: Fl (4) W 20s.
- Spain no.: ES-12610

The Punta Sardina Lighthouse (Spanish: Faro de Punta Sardina) is an active lighthouse on the Canary island of Gran Canaria. It is located north of the small town of Sardina, in the municipality of Gáldar. The Punta Sardina light marks the north-western extremity of the island, and lies between the Punta del Castillete lighthouse near Puerto de Mogán to the south and the La Isleta lighthouse of Las Palmas to the east.

== History ==
The lighthouse is the second to be constructed on the rocky headland of Punta Sardina (Sardine Point), which overlooks the Atlantic Ocean. The first was completed in 1891, as part of the first maritime lighting plan for the Canaries. It remained in service until it was demolished in the 1980s to make way for the new modern tower.

The new light first entered service in 1985, and consists of a 24 metres (79 ft) high cylinder-shaped tower, which is white with four red bands. It supports twin galleries and a lantern with a grey cupola. With a focal height of 47 metres (154 ft) above sea level, the light can be seen for 20 nautical miles. Its light characteristic is made up of four flashes of white light every twenty seconds.

The lighthouse is maintained by the Port authority of the Province of Las Palmas. It is registered under the international Admiralty number D2816 and has the NGA identifier of 113-23928.

Map showing the principal lighthouses of Gran Canaria

== See also ==
- List of lighthouses in Spain
- List of lighthouses in the Canary Islands
