= Autopista GC-1 =

Motorway in Gran Canaria, Spain

Coordinates: 27°45′23″N 15°37′01″W

Autopista GC-1
- Autopista del Sur de Gran Canaria

Route information
- Length: 75 km (47 mi)

Major junctions
- From: Las Palmas de Gran Canaria
- To: Puerto de Mogán

Location
- Country: Spain
- Autonomous community: Canary Islands
- Province: Las Palmas

Highway system
- Highways in Spain; Autopistas and autovías; National Roads; Transport in the Canary Islands

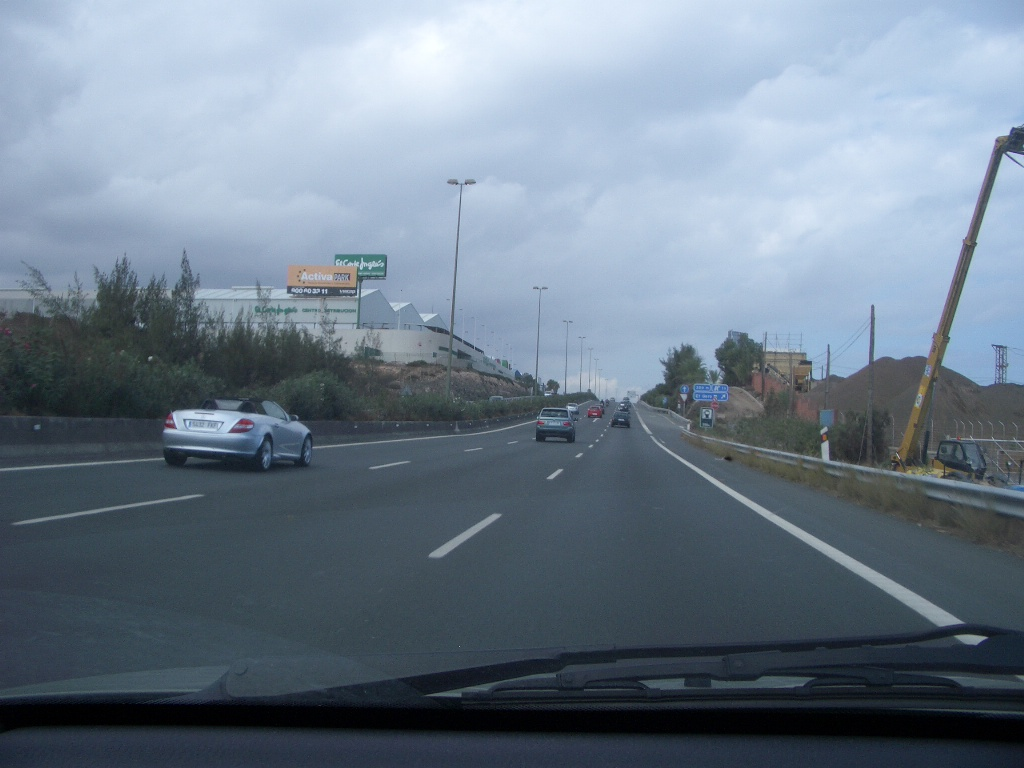
Autopista GC-1

The GC-1 (also Autopista del Sur, "Southern Highway") is a superhighway (or motorway) on the island of Gran Canaria. It links the capital Las Palmas in the north with Puerto de Mogán in the south. It is the fastest route from the north of the island to the south and vice versa with a top speed limit of 120 km/h (75 mph). It is approximately 75 km (47 miles) in length, and runs along the eastern and the southern coasts of this circular island and is also the second longest superhighway in the Canary Islands. The road provides easy access from the airport to the major cities and resorts. The resorts include Maspalomas and Playa del Inglés. The increase in tourism over the years has seen the GC1 route slowly being upgraded and widened to cope with extra traffic.

GC-1 does not have motorway designation from Las Palmas to the airport, but has motorway designation from the airport to its southern end. Although the geographical name for the official name of the "Southern" highway is used, this is to differentiate it from the Autovía GC-2, and not because there are two motorways on the island.

== Description ==
The GC1 begins south of the downtown area of Las Palmas de Gran Canaria, the superhighway runs within the beach of Las Palmas de Gran Canaria and 2 km south intersects with the GC2 and later runs with a few clover leaf interchange and later forms a junction with GC5 and south, the GC31. The highway runs east of Telde and has a cloverleaf interchange with GC-10 (Exit 8), a parclo interchange (Exit 10), it passes into an area where most of the island's farmlands are located and into the subdivision and the industrial area, where it has another cloverleaf interchange (Exit 25). The superhighway has some interchanges to the southeast for the tourist resorts and passes through a number of tunnels before ending at the GC-200 road to the North of Puerto de Mogán.

== History ==
The superhighway was first opened in the mid to late 1970s when tourism arrived. It first opened within Las Palmas de Gran Canaria and later extended to Telde as well as the airport and the subdivision area, along with the industrial area and, in the 1990s, was extended to the touristic part of the island, and finally near Arguineguín. Construction of the extension from Puerto Rico through to Puerto de Mogán started in 2009 and was completed and opened to traffic on 25 March 2013.

== Municipalities ==
- Las Palmas de Gran Canaria
- Telde
- Ingenio
- Agüimes
- Sta. Lucía de Tirajana
- San Bartolomé de Tirajana
- Mogán

== See also ==
- Autopista GC-2
- Autopista GC-3
