= Punta de Arinaga Lighthouse =

Lighthouse on Gran Canaria, Spain

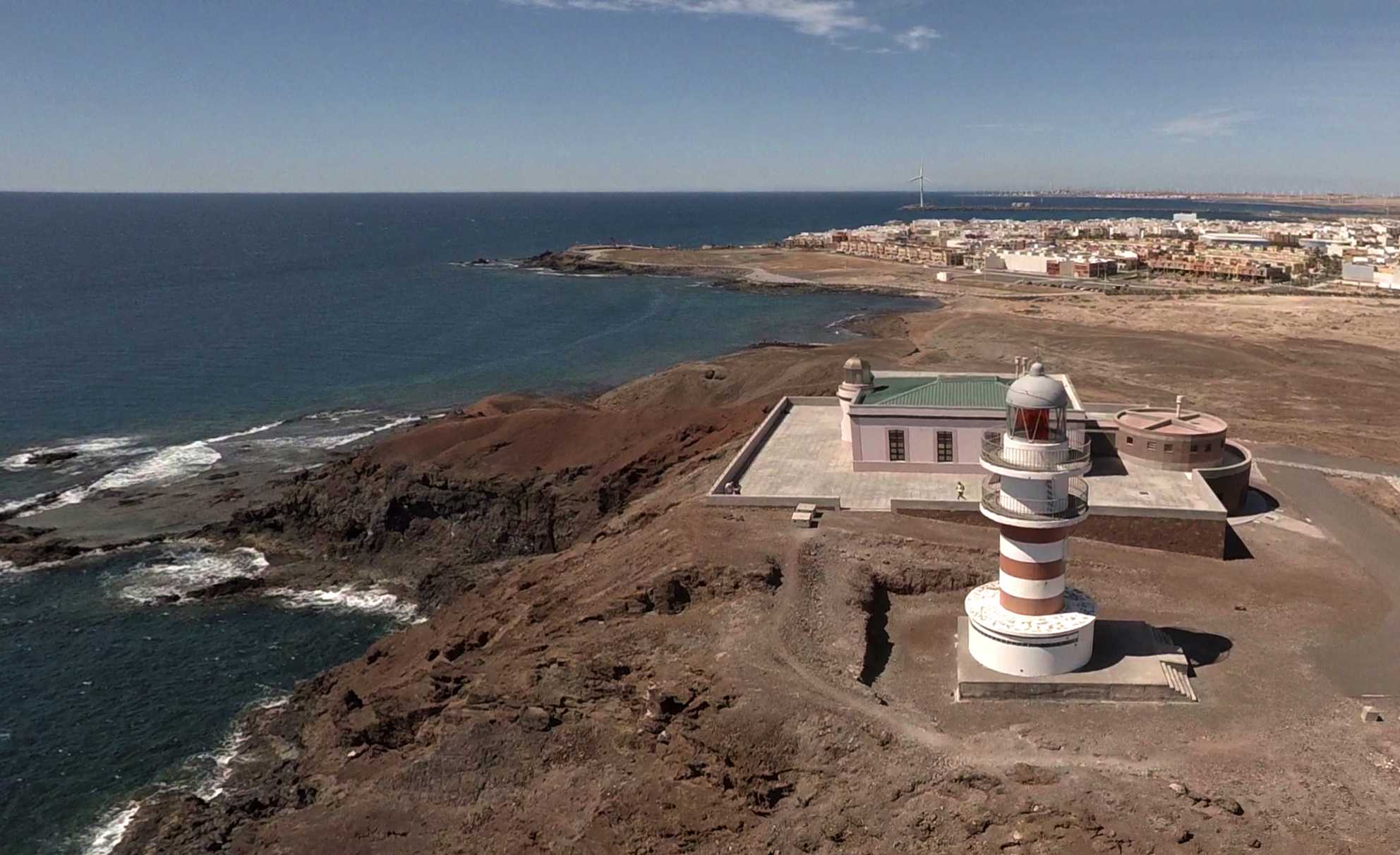
- Overhead view of the lighthouse
- Location: Agüimes; Gran Canaria; Canary Islands; Spain
- Coordinates: 27.864080°N 15.384627°W

Tower
- Constructed: 1897 (first) ? (second)
- Construction: masonry tower (current) stone tower (first) concrete tower (second)
- Height: 14 metres (46 ft) (current); 6 metres (20 ft) (first); 9 metres (30 ft) (second)
- Shape: cylindrical tower with double balcony and lantern (current) cylindrical tower attached to one-storey keeper's house (first) cylindrical tower with balcony attached to one end keeper's house (second)
- Markings: tower with red and white bands, white balcony, glass lantern dome (current)
- Operator: Autoridad Portuaria de Las Palmas de Gran Canaria

Light
- First lit: 1984 (current)
- Deactivated: 1984 (second)
- Focal height: 47 metres (154 ft) (current)
- Range: 12 nautical miles (22 km; 14 mi)
- Characteristic: Fl (3) WR 10s.
- Spain no.: ES-12510

The Punta de Arinaga Lighthouse (Spanish: Faro de Punta de Arinaga) is an active lighthouse on the Spanish island of Gran Canaria in the Canary islands. The current lighthouse tower is the third to be constructed on the rocky headland of Punta Arinaga, near the town of the same name in the municipality of Agüimes. Arinaga is on the south-east side of the island and marks the coastline between the Maspalomas lighthouse to the south and the Punta de Melenara lighthouse of Telde to the north.

== History ==
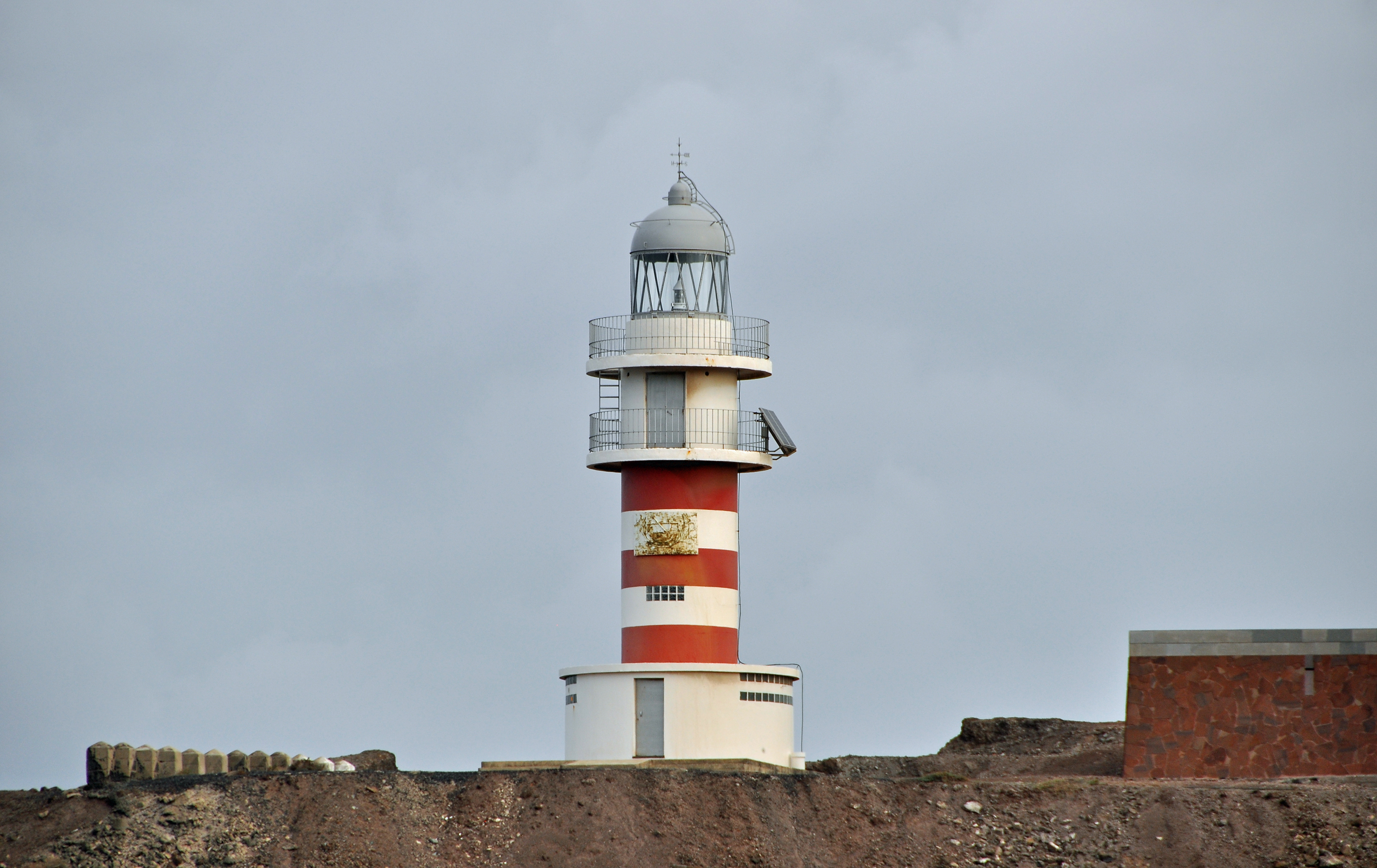
The current tower built in the 1984

The first lighthouse was completed in 1897, as part of the first maritime lighting plan for the Canaries, built in a similar style to other Canarian 19th century lights, it consists of a white washed single storey building, with dark volcanic rock used for the masonry detailing. The light was shown from a lantern room at the top of a six-metre-high (20-foot) masonry tower, attached to the seaward side of the house, overlooking the Atlantic Ocean. It remained in service until it was replaced in the 1960s by a new taller tower, which was connected to the side of the original station. Photographs show that this second tower was removed in the recent refurbishment and renovation of the original building.

The third lighthouse which was also built nearby, first entered service in 1984. This active light consists of a 14-metre-high (46 ft) cylinder-shaped tower, which supports twin galleries and the lantern. The tower is predominantly white, but with three red bands. The lantern emits both red and white light, varying with direction, at a focal height of 47 m above sea level. The white light can be seen for 12 nautical miles and the red for nine. Its light characteristic is made up of three flashes every ten seconds.

The lighthouse is not connected to the electricity grid, but instead is powered by six solar panels charging a set of batteries. The 2.25 m lantern is equipped with a 100 W halogen lamp, producing the red and white light.

Maintained by the Port authority of Las Palmas, it is registered under the international Admiralty number D2812 and has the NGA identifier of 113–24008.

== Renovation ==
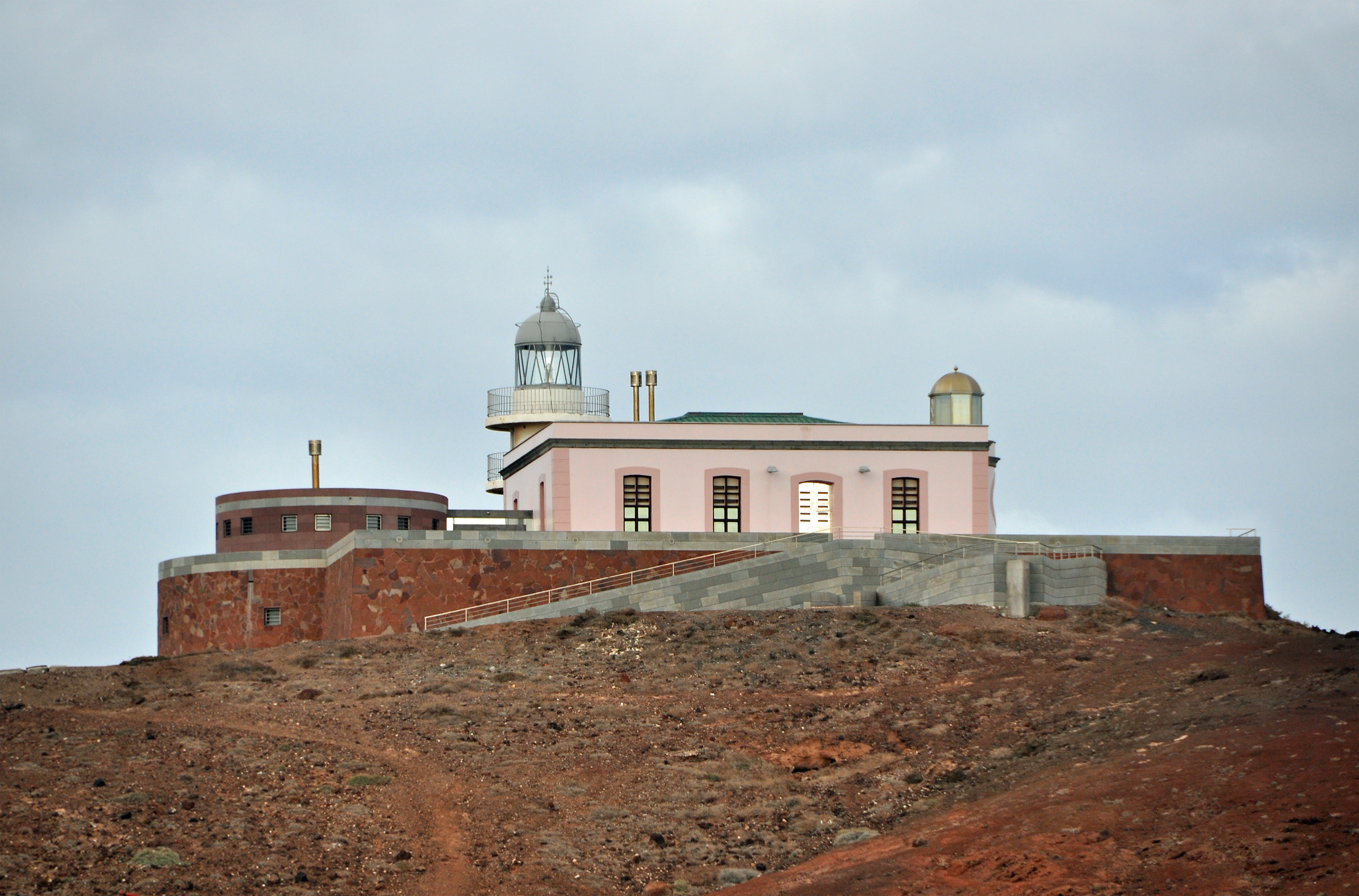
Renovated original lighthouse in 2012

The old lighthouse building was handed over to the local council of Agüimes, who carried out a comprehensive restoration, culminating in an opening ceremony hosted by the local major in March 2011. It was expected that the 750,000 euro refurbishment of the keeper's quarters would enable the historical structure to be used as a high quality restaurant. Over a four-year period the council advertised three different tenders to operate and manage a restaurant business at the site, the last one in late 2014, but there were no successful bidders until 2016.

The Restaurante Faro de Arinaga opened in August 2016 with a concession to operate for fifteen years. With an emphasis on Canarian-Mediterranean cuisine the restaurant can seat 120 diners within the renovated building and 80 on the exterior terrace.

Map showing the principal lighthouses of Gran Canaria

== See also ==
- List of lighthouses in the Canary Islands
- List of lighthouses in Spain
