= La Isleta Lighthouse =

Lighthouse on Gran Canaria, Spain

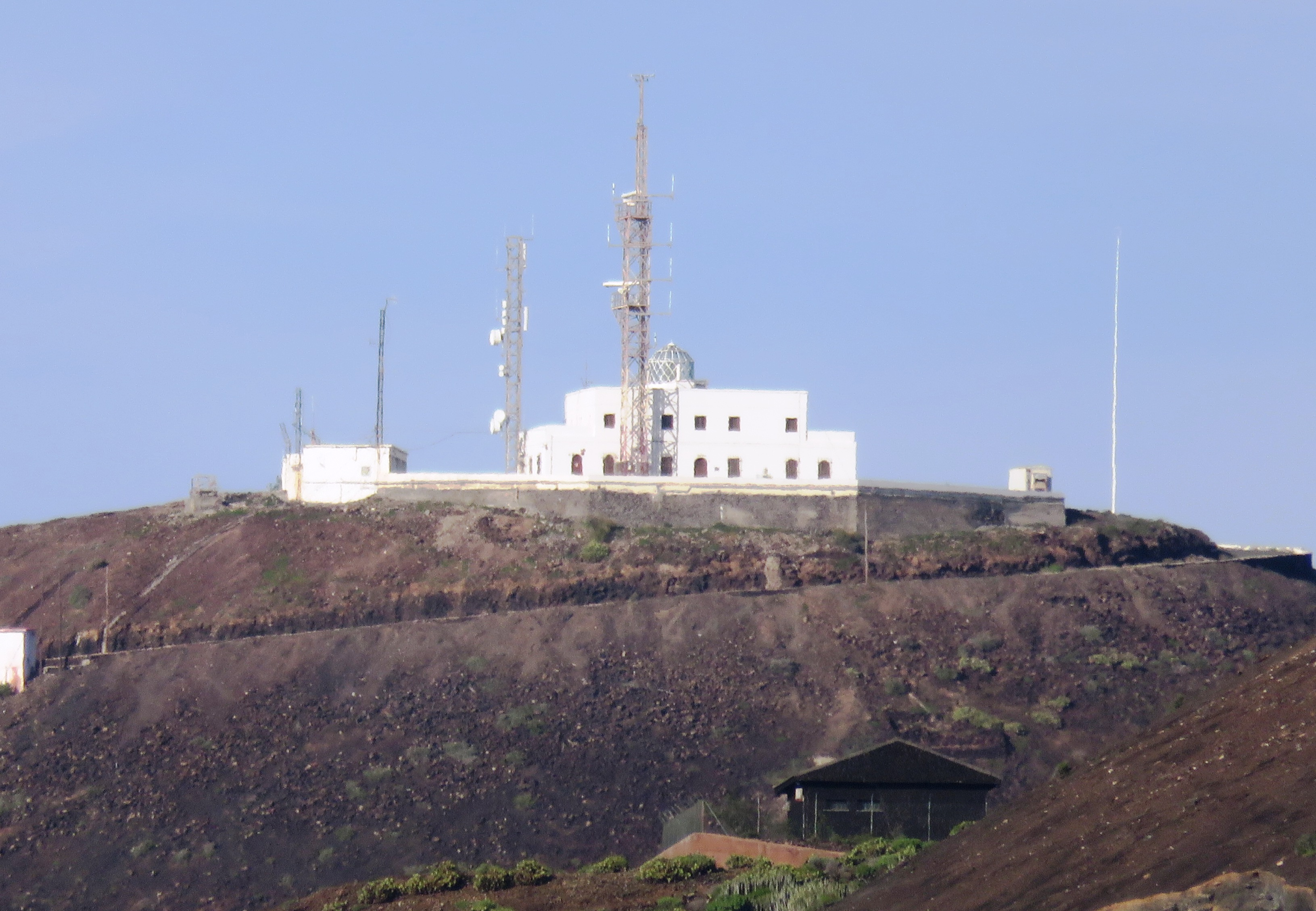
- La Isleta in 2015
- Location: Las Palmas, Gran Canaria
- Coordinates: 28.17408°N 15.41897°W

Tower
- Constructed: 1865
- Height: 10 metres (33 ft)

Light
- First lit: 1865
- Focal height: 249 metres (817 ft)
- Range: 21 nautical miles (39 km; 24 mi)
- Characteristic: L 0 3 oc 2 5 L 0 3 oc 2 5 L 0 3 oc 6 9 L 0 3 oc 6 9

La Isleta Lighthouse (Spanish: Faro de La Isleta) is an active 19th century lighthouse on the Spanish island of Gran Canaria in the Canary islands. The lighthouse has been constructed on the rocky peninsula of La Isleta, which overlooks the Port of Las Palmas to the north of the city of Las Palmas, the capital of Gran Canaria. Situated at the north-eastern tip of the island, the La Isleta light marks the approaches to the port and lies midway between the Sardina lighthouse to the east and the Punta de Melenara lighthouse of Telde to the south.

== Description ==
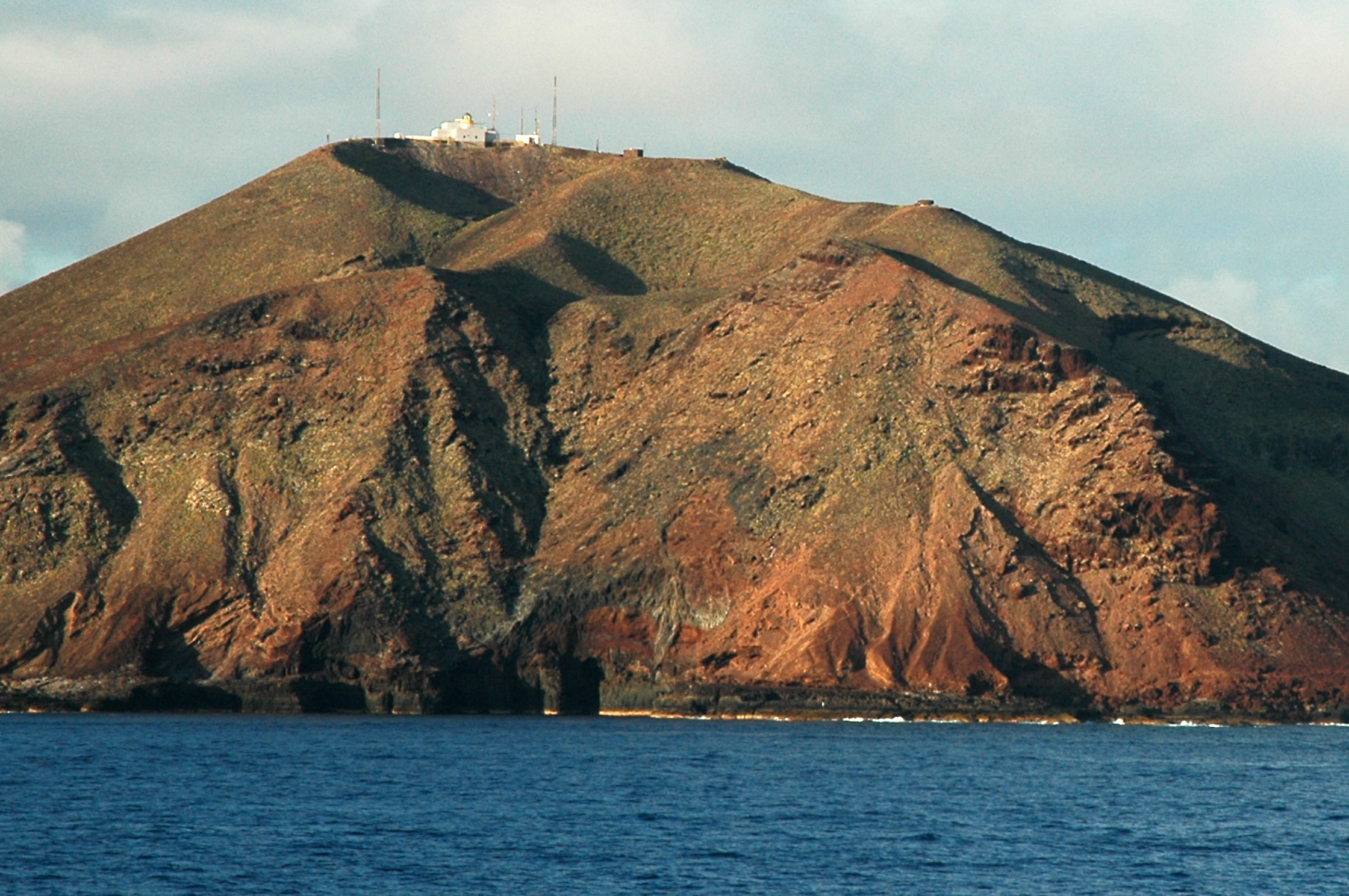
General view of the lighthouse from a distance

La Isleta was one of the first lighthouse to be completed as part of the original maritime lighting plan for the Canaries, and is the oldest lighthouse in Gran Canaria. Designed by the engineer by Juan de León y Castillo, it became operational in 1865 and consists of a two-storey white washed building. The light is displayed from a lantern room at the top of a masonry tower, above the building.

The hilltop location of the lighthouse means that it has a focal height of 249 meters above sea level, the highest operational light in Spain. Its light characteristic is made up of a flash of white light every twenty seconds, and has a nominal range of 21 nautical miles.

The optics consist of a third order Barbier, Benard, et Turenne Fresnel lens and drive system, with a 400 watt lamp. As well as acting as a maritime light, it also functions as an aerial beacon used for air navigation.

La Isleta was the last lighthouse on Gran Canaria to be automated in 1999 when the last keeper Augustine Becerra, retired. In July 2015 a plaque was unveiled at the lighthouse by the president of the Las Palmas Port Authority, to highlight the work of the keepers including Becerra, who had maintained the lighthouse, and to mark 150 years of operation of the light.

Located within a military zone of the peninsula, in an area not open to the public, the lighthouse is now operated in a semi-automatic way, receiving only periodic visits from technicians from the maritime signals team of the Port Authority of Las Palmas. It is registered under the international Admiralty number D2798 and has the NGA identifier of 113-23932.

Map showing the principal lighthouses of Gran Canaria

== See also ==
- List of lighthouses in the Canary Islands
- List of lighthouses in Spain
