= Autovía GC-2 =

Superhighway in Gran Canaria (Canary Islands)

Autovía GC-2
- Autovía del Norte de Gran Canaria

Route information
- Length: 36 km (22 mi)

Major junctions
- From: Las Palmas de Gran Canaria
- To: Agaete

Location
- Country: Spain
- Autonomous community: Canary Islands
- Province: Las Palmas

Highway system
- Highways in Spain; Autopistas and autovías; National Roads; Transport in the Canary Islands

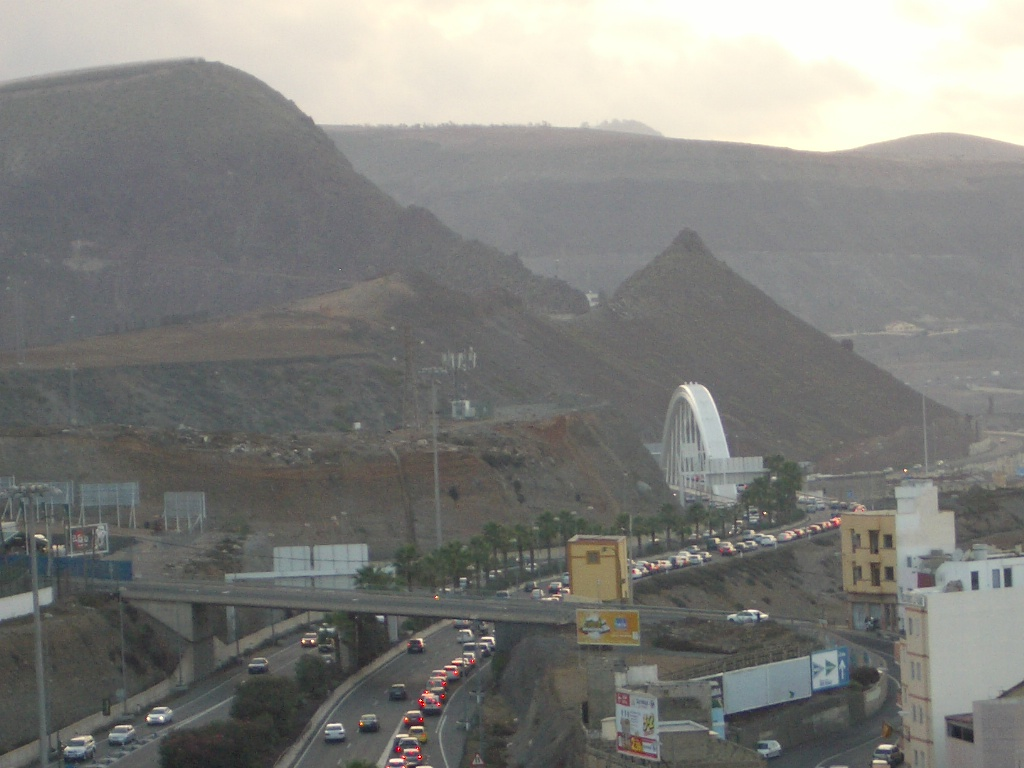
Autovía GC-2

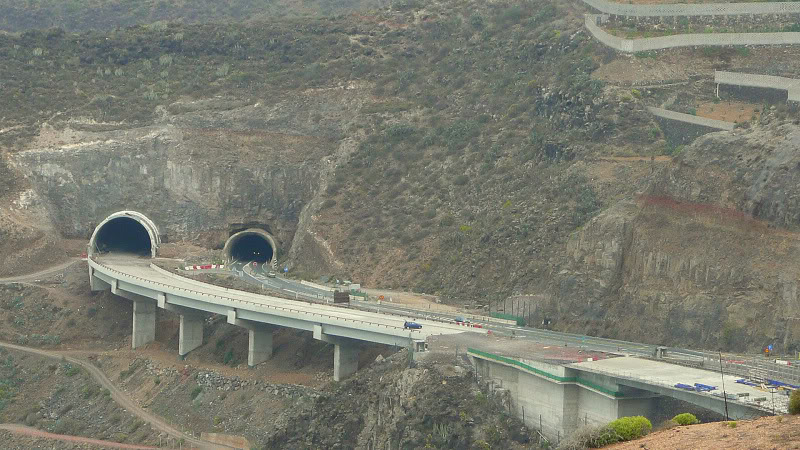
Autovía GC-2

The GC-2 (or Autovía del Norte, "Northern Highway") is a superhighway in Gran Canaria (Canary Islands). It connects Las Palmas de Gran Canaria with the village of Agaete.

The eastern portion, for about 20 km, is a superhighway with interchange numbers; the western part is like a freeway (because it has exit numbers) but the rest of the highway only has two lanes.

== Description ==
The superhighway begins by the beach area of the island or the Canary Islands' co-capital with the highway GC1. The highway runs through the downtown area and links with a roundabout interchange with GC23.

The freeway runs within the beaches and the coastline of the Atlantic Ocean for the half part but at around the twentieth kilometre, it becomes a highway after the unidirectional parclo interchanges and runs within the coastline, it later has several interchanges and several towns as it passes to the northwest and finally, it ends in Agaete.

== History ==
The superhighway was first opened in the late-1970s when tourism arrived, it first opened within Las Palmas de Gran Canaria, it later extended to the western part and with the GC23. The superhighway later extended to the coastline and the highway later bypasses towns in the 1980s and the 1990s to Agaete with several towns, that section within Agaete added interchange numbers and exit numbers but it not classifies as a superhighway.

=== 21st century ===
A project to extend the GC-2 from Agaete to La Aldea de San Nicolás was drafted between 2001 and 2011. This project was split into two phases:

- Phase 1: La Aldea de San Nicolás to the village of El Risco
- Phase 2: El Risco to Agaete

Phase 1 opened in mid-2017, providing respite to communities that had been cut off when a landslide in September 2016 forced the permanent closure of the nearby GC-200 coastal road.

On 24 September 2019, work began on phase 2 at a projected cost of €157 million, and with the expectation that it would take 65 months to complete.

== Municipalities ==
- Las Palmas
- Arucas
- Moya
- Santa María de Guía de Gran Canaria
- Gáldar
- Agaete
- Artenara
- La Aldea de San Nicolás

== See also ==
- Autopista GC-1
- Autopista GC-3
