= Autovía GC-3 =

Autovía GC-3
- Circunvalación de Las Palmas de Gran Canaria

Route information
- Length: 13 km (8.1 mi)

Major junctions
- From: GC-1
- To: GC-2

Location
- Country: Spain
- Autonomous community: Canary Islands
- Province: Las Palmas

Highway system
- Highways in Spain; Autopistas and autovías; National Roads; Transport in the Canary Islands

The GC-3, known officially as Circunvalación de Las Palmas de Gran Canaria (Las Palmas de Gran Canaria Bypass) is a superhighway in Gran Canaria (Canary Islands). It connects the two trunk roads GC-1 (Autopista del Sur de Gran Canaria) and GC-2 (Autovía del Norte de Gran Canaria) over a length of 13 km (8.1 mi). A good half of the north-south traffic on the island is now handled by the GC-3, which significantly relieves the Avenida Marítima and the Túnel del Ingeniero Julio Luengo.

== Description ==
More than half of the 13 km (8.1 mi) long route leads over bridges or through tunnels. As a result, the total cost of the motorway was 228 million euros, most of which was raised by the European "FEDER" fund.

Construction began in 1997 and can be divided into five phases:

- The 1st phase includes the section Tamaraceite – Siete Palmas. Construction began in 1996 and the road section was inaugurated in 1999.
- The 2nd phase (Nueva Paterna – Pico Viento), which comprises the section that runs from Siete Palmas to Tafira Baja and the execution of the GC-31 highway from Tafira Baja to San Cristóbal, began to be built in 1998 and was opened in 2003.
- The 3rd phase (Pico Viento – Jinámar) comprises the section between Tafira Baja to GC-1. Construction began at the same time as Phase II, and the section was inaugurated jointly with it by the Minister of Development Francisco Álvarez-Cascos in 2003.
- The 4th phase includes the section Tamaraceite – Arucas. Its construction went under tender in March 2007, and works began in December 2008. Completion was initially expected in 2012, but due to the economic crisis, completion was set for 2015. The highway was eventually inaugurated in 2016 and opened to traffic in two stages: the direction from Arucas to Tamaraceite in mid-summer, and from Tamaraceite to Arucas in mid-November.
- The 5th phase comprises the Arucas – GC-2 section. Its construction began in conjunction with the 4th phase. Completion of the work was originally planned for 2010–2011. Due to the economic crisis it was scheduled to open in autumn 2020, but as of July 2021 its expected completion date is 31 October 2021.

The maximum height difference on the route is 300 metres (980 ft) (lowest point at 30 m, highest point at 330 m).

== See also ==
- Autovía GC-1
- Autovía GC-2
