= Mogán =

- Municipality
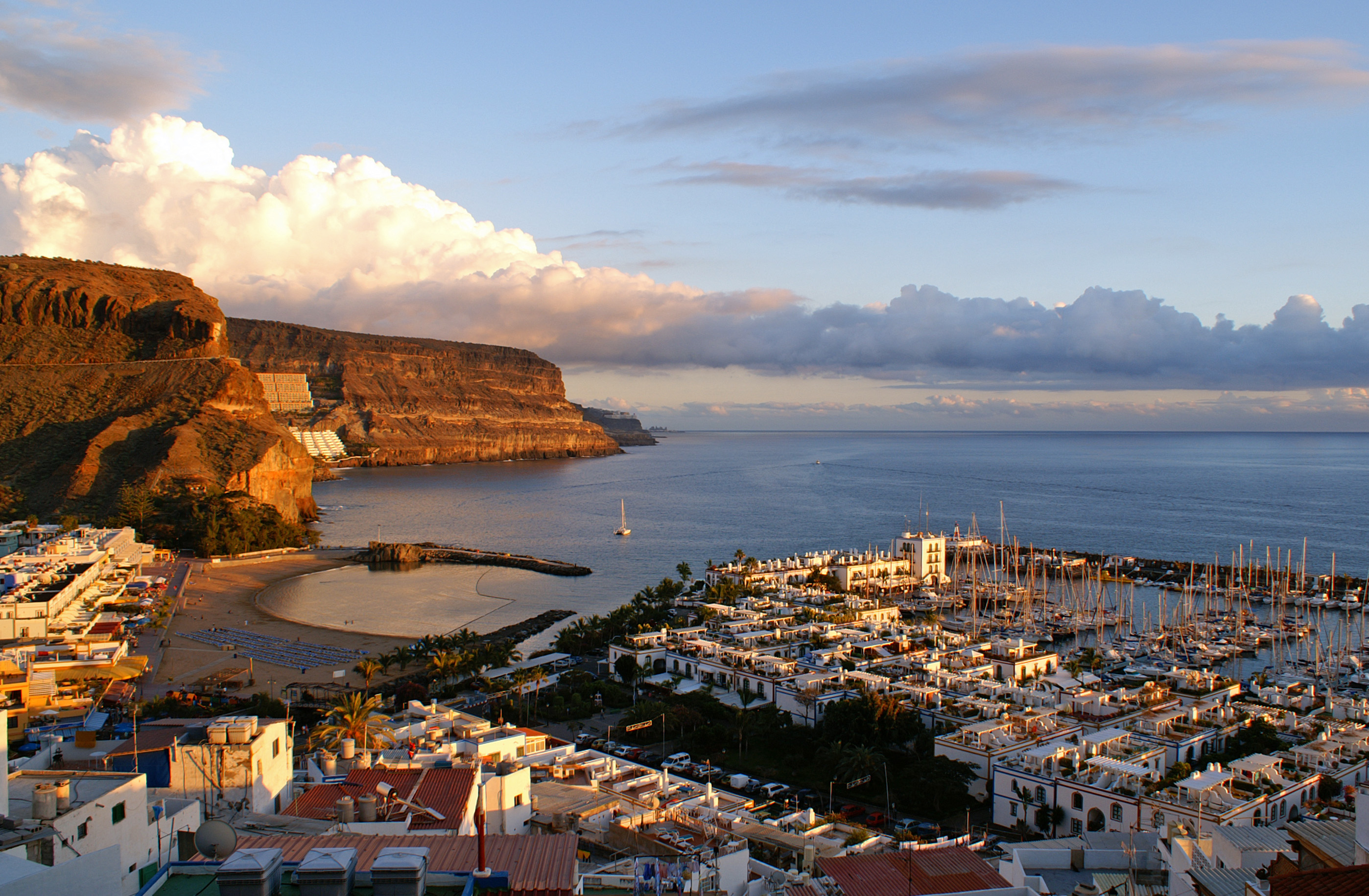
- Mogán port

- Flag Coat of arms

- Municipal location in Gran Canaria

- Location in the province of Las Palmas Mogán (Canary Islands) Mogán (Spain, Canary Islands)
- Coordinates: 27°53′1″N 15°43′24″W
- Country: Spain
- Autonomous Region: Canary Islands
- Province: Las Palmas
- Island: Gran Canaria

Government
  - Mayor: Francisco González (PP)

Area
  - Total: 172.44 km^{2} (66.58 sq mi)
- Elevation (AMSL): 253 m (830 ft)

Population (2025-01-01)
  - Total: 21,172
  - Density: 122.78/km^{2} (318.00/sq mi)
- Time zone: UTC+0 (CET)
  - Summer (DST): UTC+1 (CEST (GMT +1))
- Postal code: 35140
- Area code: +34 (Spain) + 928 (Las Palmas)
- Website: www.mogan.es

Mogán is a town and a Spanish municipality in the southwestern part of the island of Gran Canaria, which is one of the three main islands making up the Province of Las Palmas in the Canary Islands, Spain. Its population is 21,782 (2013), and the area is 172.44 km^{2}.

== Geography ==
Mogán is the second largest municipality by area on the island. It includes the fishing towns of Puerto de Mogán and Arguineguín. Much of the population lives on the Atlantic coastline. The town of Mogán is about 8 kilometres from the coast, 11 km north of Puerto Rico de Gran Canaria and 40 km south-west of Las Palmas. The GC-1 motorway passes through the south of the municipality. There is a string of tourist resorts along the coast.

The main settlements are:

- Arguineguín
- Cornisa del Suroeste
- Mogán
- Playa de Mogán
- Puerto de Mogán
- Puerto Rico
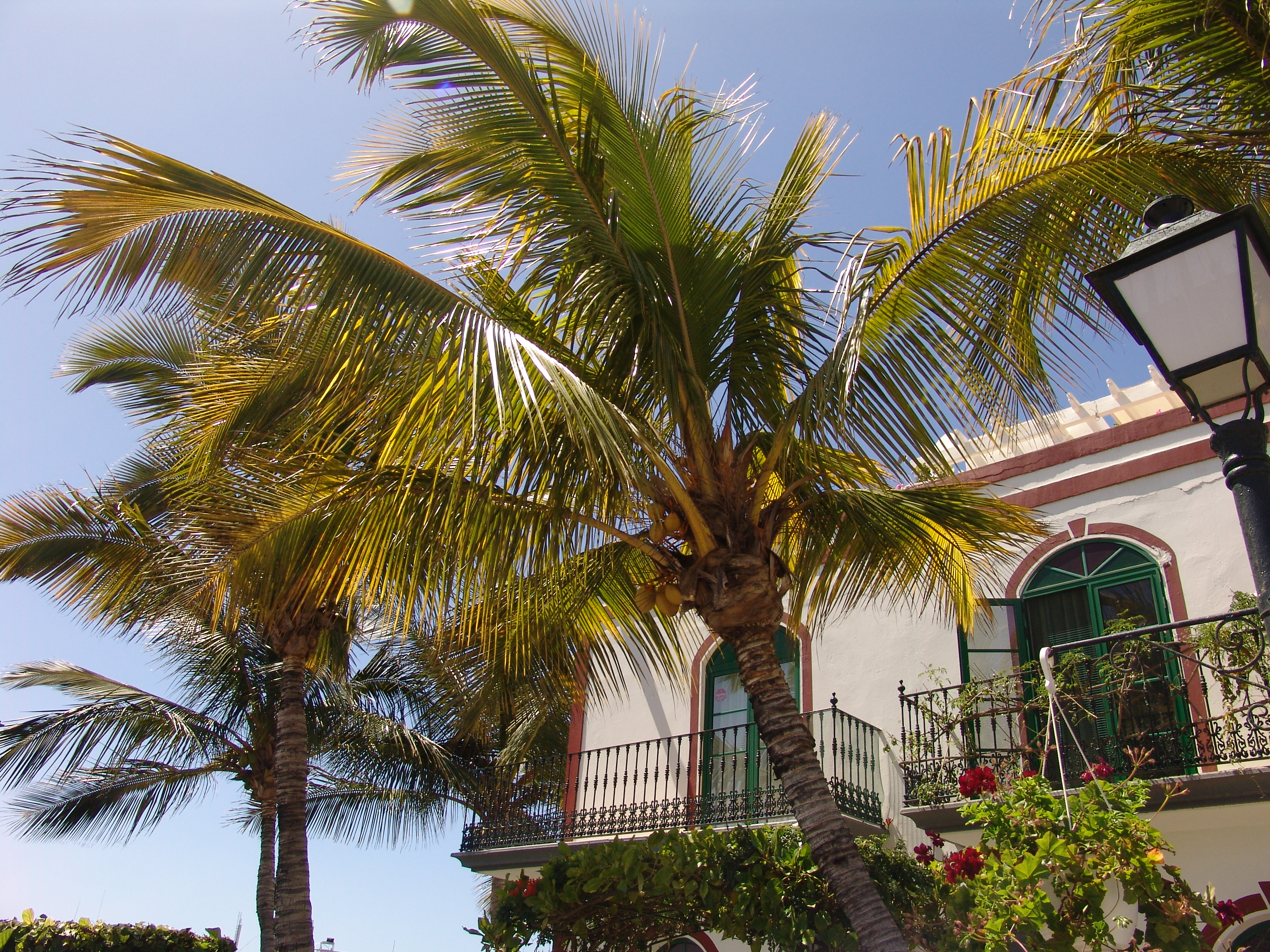
Puerto de Mogan, coconut palms.

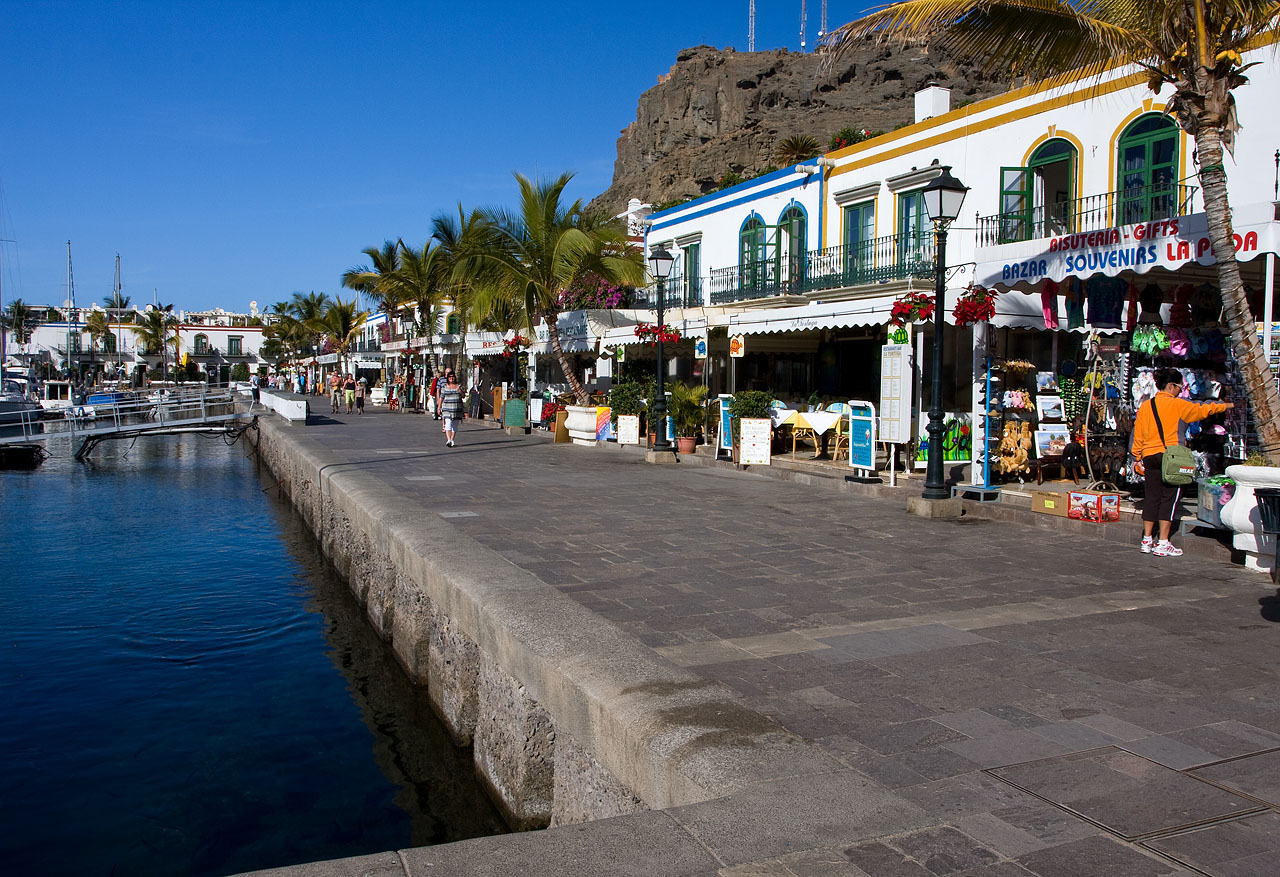
Puerto de Mogan, a resort and fishing village.

== Population ==
Historical population

Year	Pop.	±%
1991	8,688	—
1996	10,398	+19.7%
2001	12,444	+19.7%
2002	15,935	+28.1%

Year	Pop.	±%
2003	15,932	−0.0%
2004	15,176	−4.7%
2013	21,782	+43.5%
2017	19,783	−9.2%

== Heritage sites ==
=== Archaeology ===
Three sites on the municipality grounds are listed Property of cultural interest in the "archaeological zone" category:

The Cats' ravine (cañada de los Gatos or Lomo los Gatos) is located at the mouth of the Mogan ravine that opens onto Mogan beach. (Note: This YouTube video shows the Mogan's ravine (1'02 - 1'11) where the Cat's' ravine archaeological site is located.)

The valley of the Sea (cañada de la Mar) was also declared Property of cultural interest as archaeological zone, in 2005.

Veneguera's "Cogolla" (La Cogolla de Veneguera) is in the upper part of the Veneguera ravine in the north-west of the municipality.

=== Ethnology ===
Mogan's windmill ("molino quemado de Mogán" is listed since 2002 as Heritage site in the category "ethnological site".

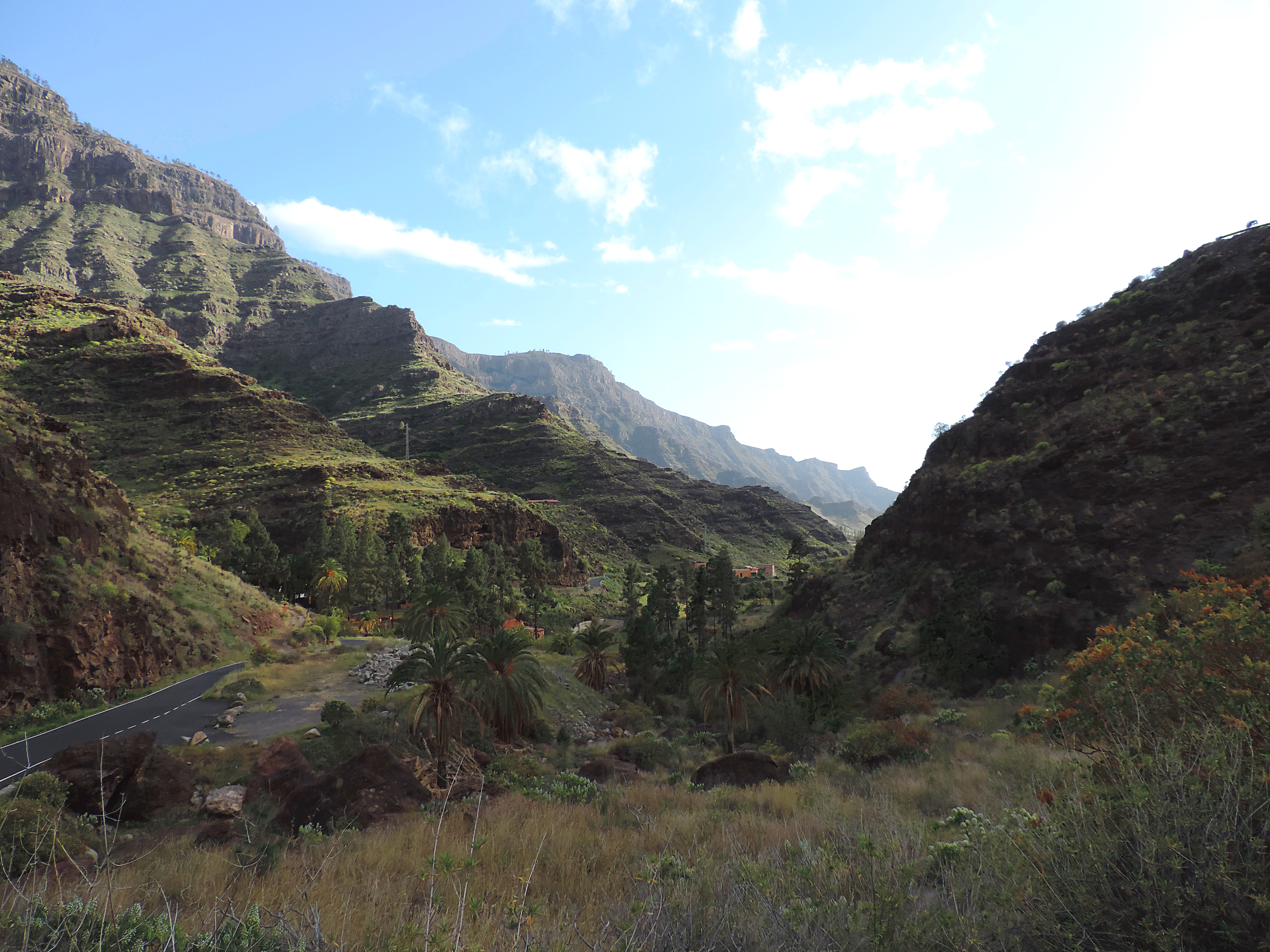
Mogan ravine

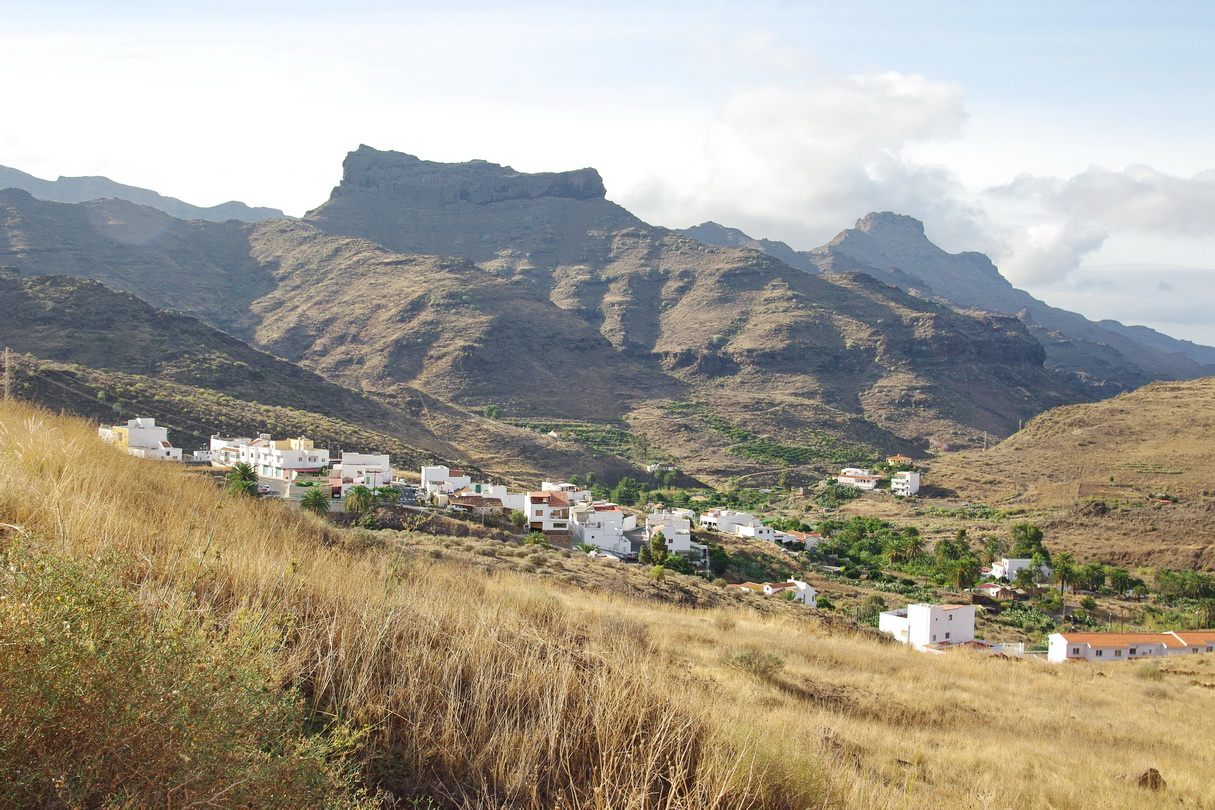
Veneguera

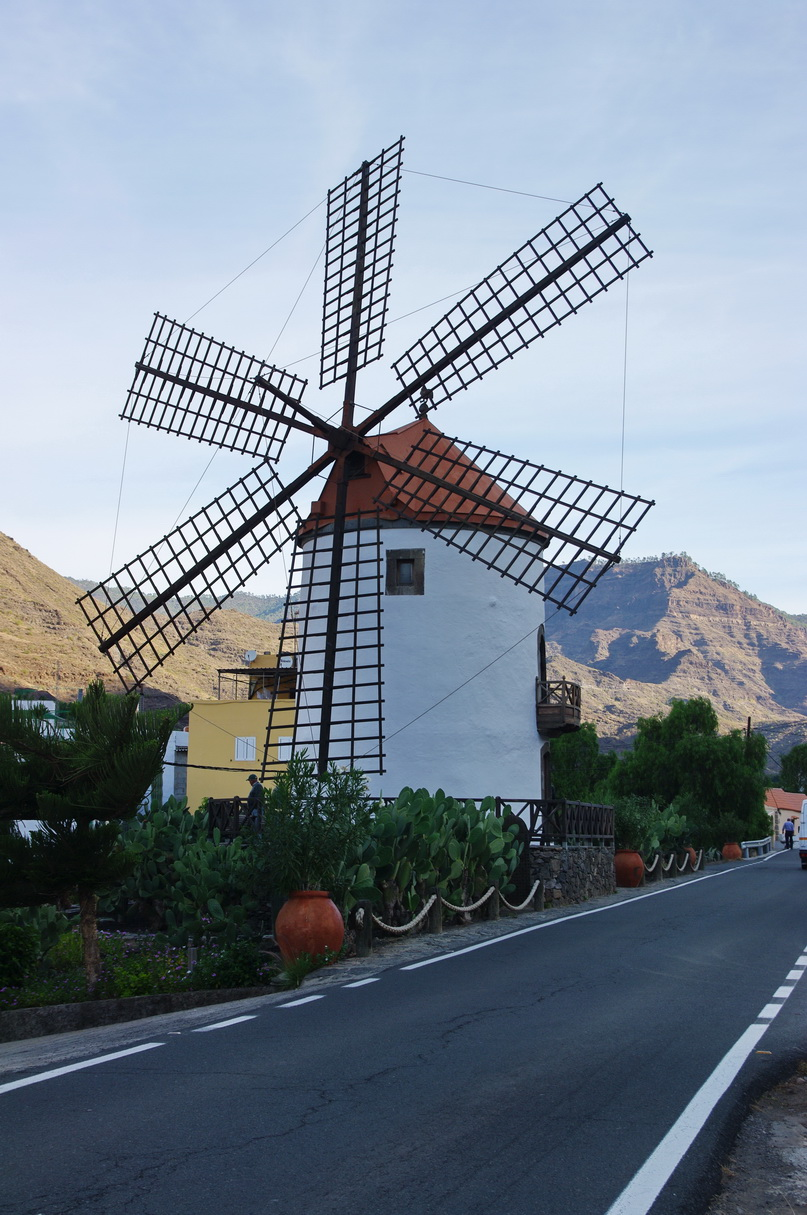
The Burnt mill
(Molino quemado)

== See also ==
- List of municipalities in Las Palmas
