= Puerto Rico de Gran Canaria =

Holiday resort in Mogán, Gran Canaria

Coordinates: 27°47′17″N 15°42′40″W

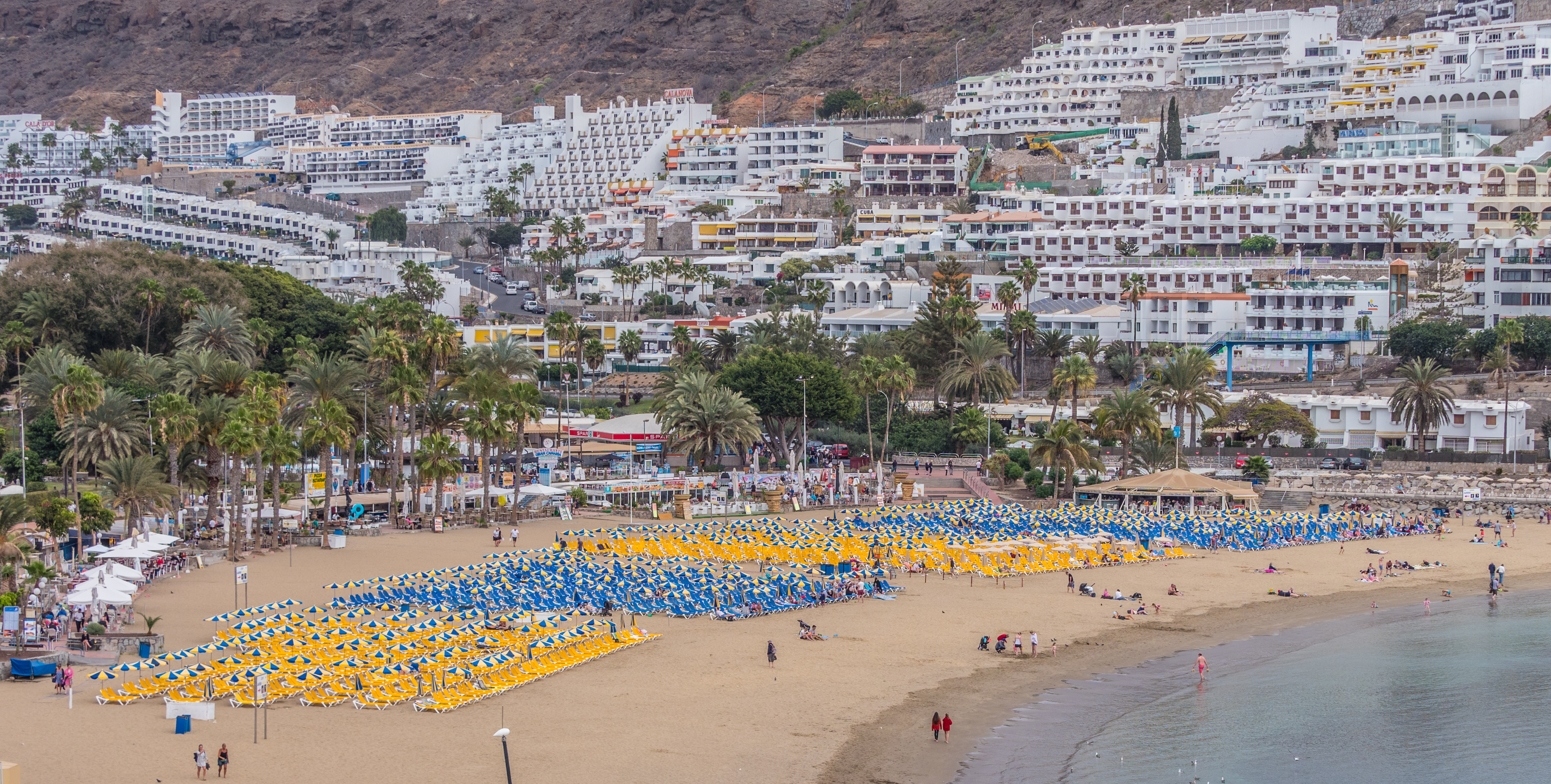
Puerto Rico, February 2018

Puerto Rico de Gran Canaria is a holiday resort situated on the south-west coast of the Spanish island of Gran Canaria. Temperatures in the winter remain around 20-25 °C while there is an average of less than three days per month of precipitation.

The volcanic origin of Gran Canaria provides for the island's coastal ruggedness and contrasting verdant interior. Many of the rocky ravines that lead down to the coastline on the southern side of the island have been developed with holiday installations similar to that of Puerto Rico de Gran Canaria. Apartment complexes and hotels crowd the sides of the otherwise barren cliffs leading down to long, natural beaches.

Puerto Rico has a sandy beach and two small harbours. Inside Puerto Rico de Gran Canaria the majority of shops and restaurants are situated in small commercial shopping centers. The Pasarela center is located closest to the beach, while the main Commercial Center is at the center of Puerto Rico de Gran Canaria, Europa Center on the western side, and the more exclusive Mogán Mall is located further uptown.

== Puerto Rico gallery ==
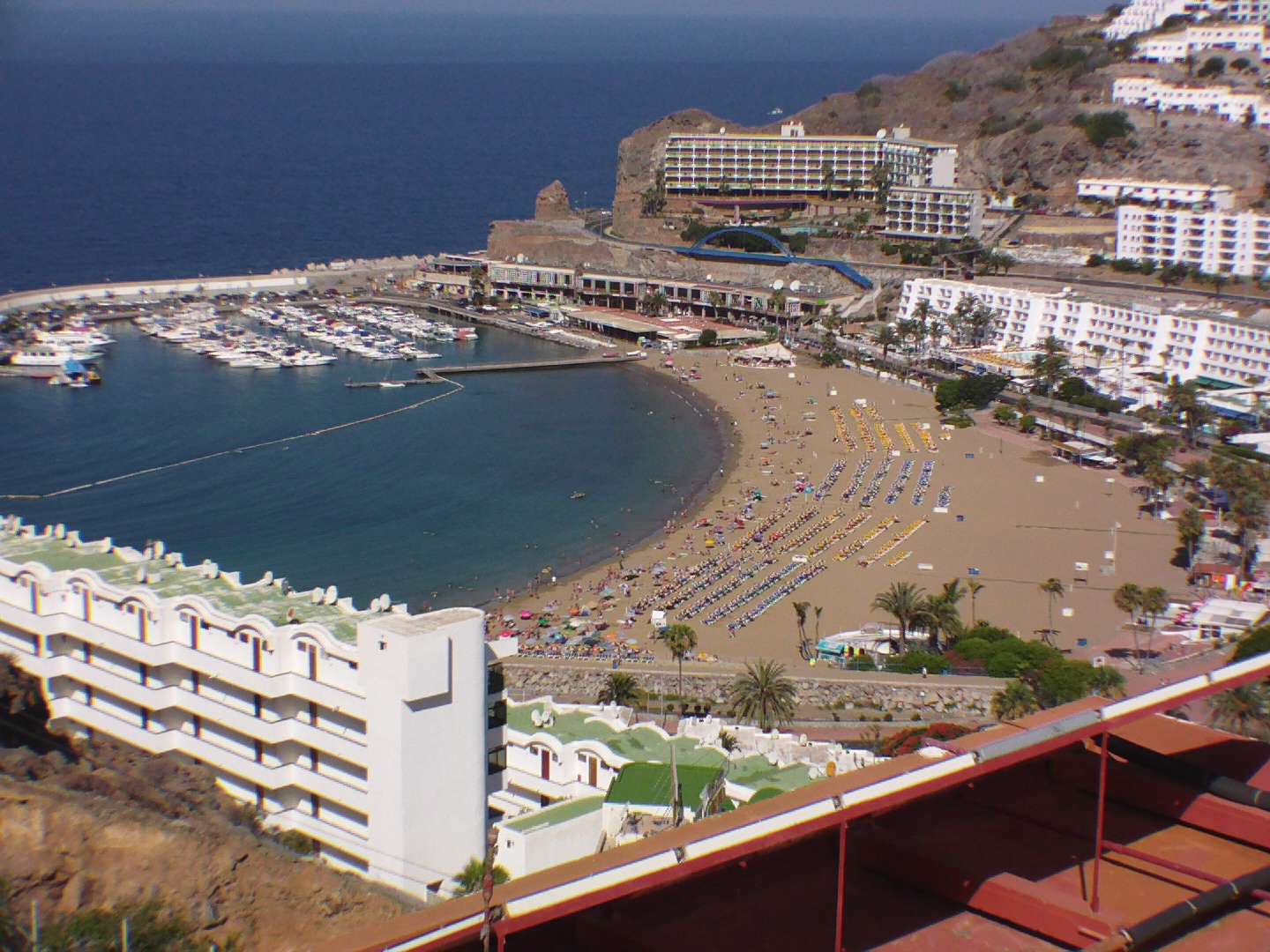
Puerto Rico 2011

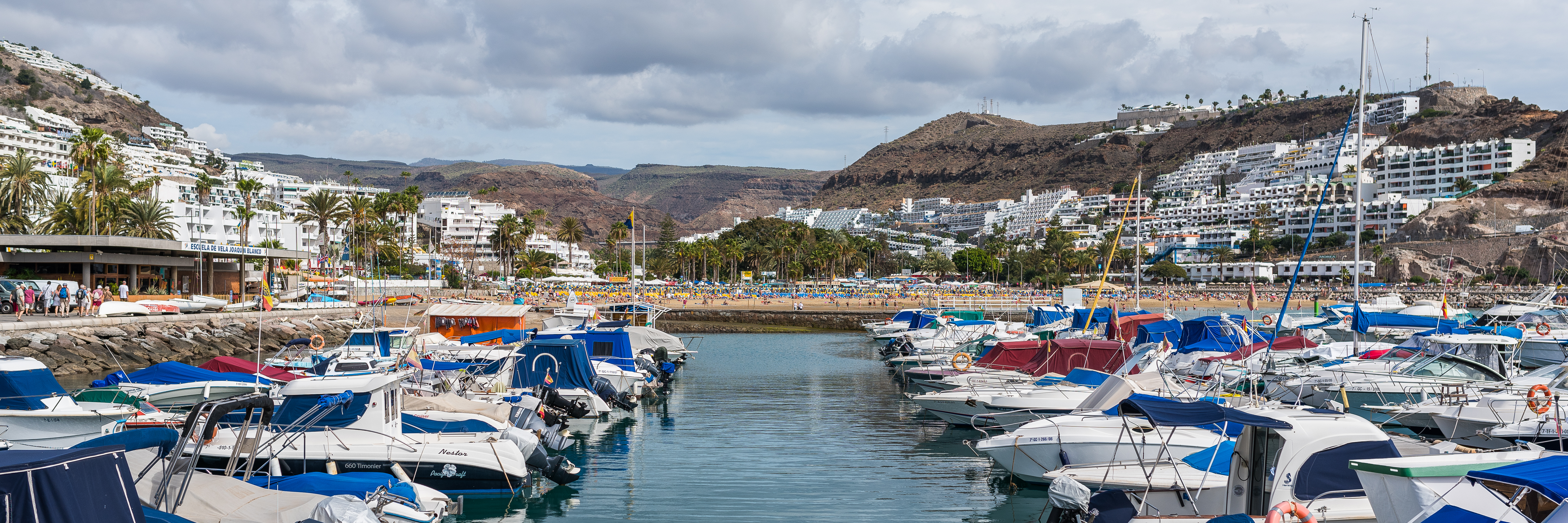
Puerto Rico 2016

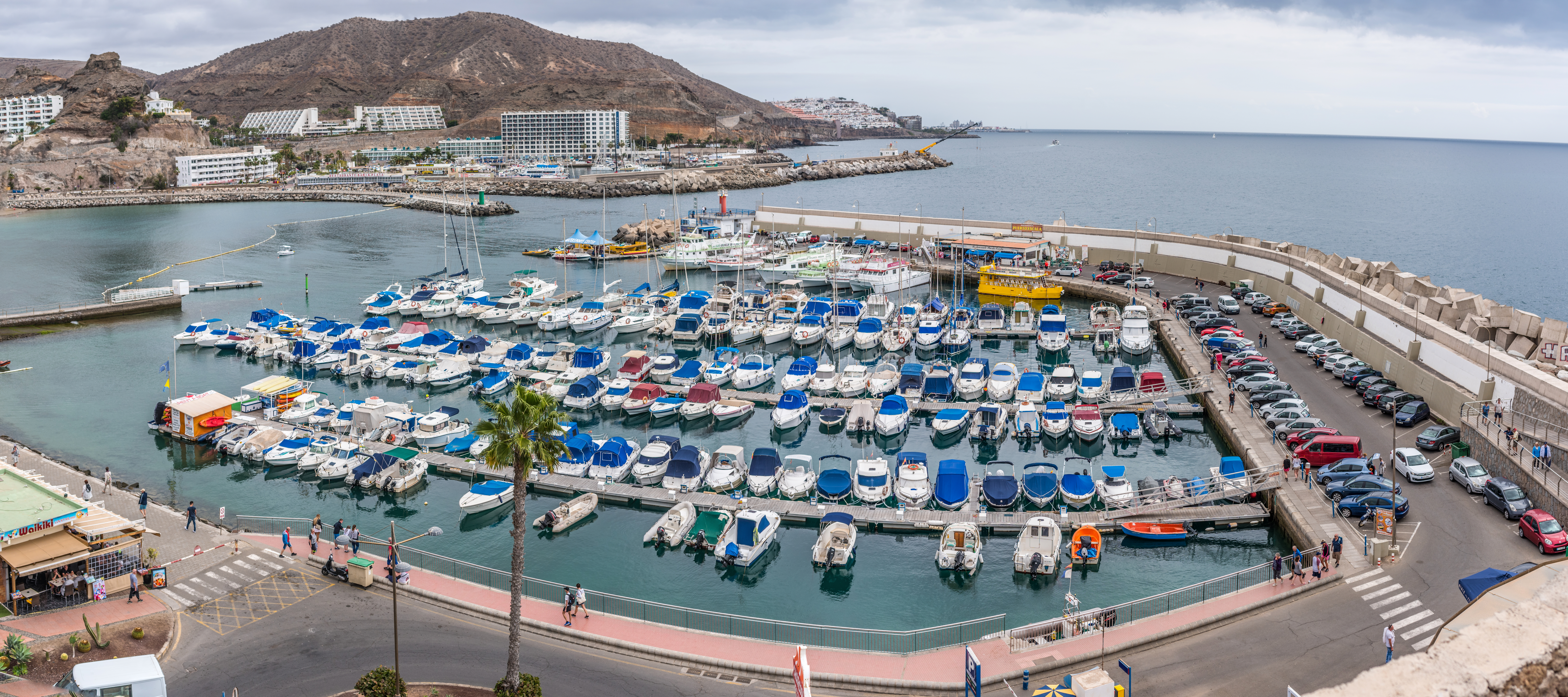
Puerto Rico, February 2018

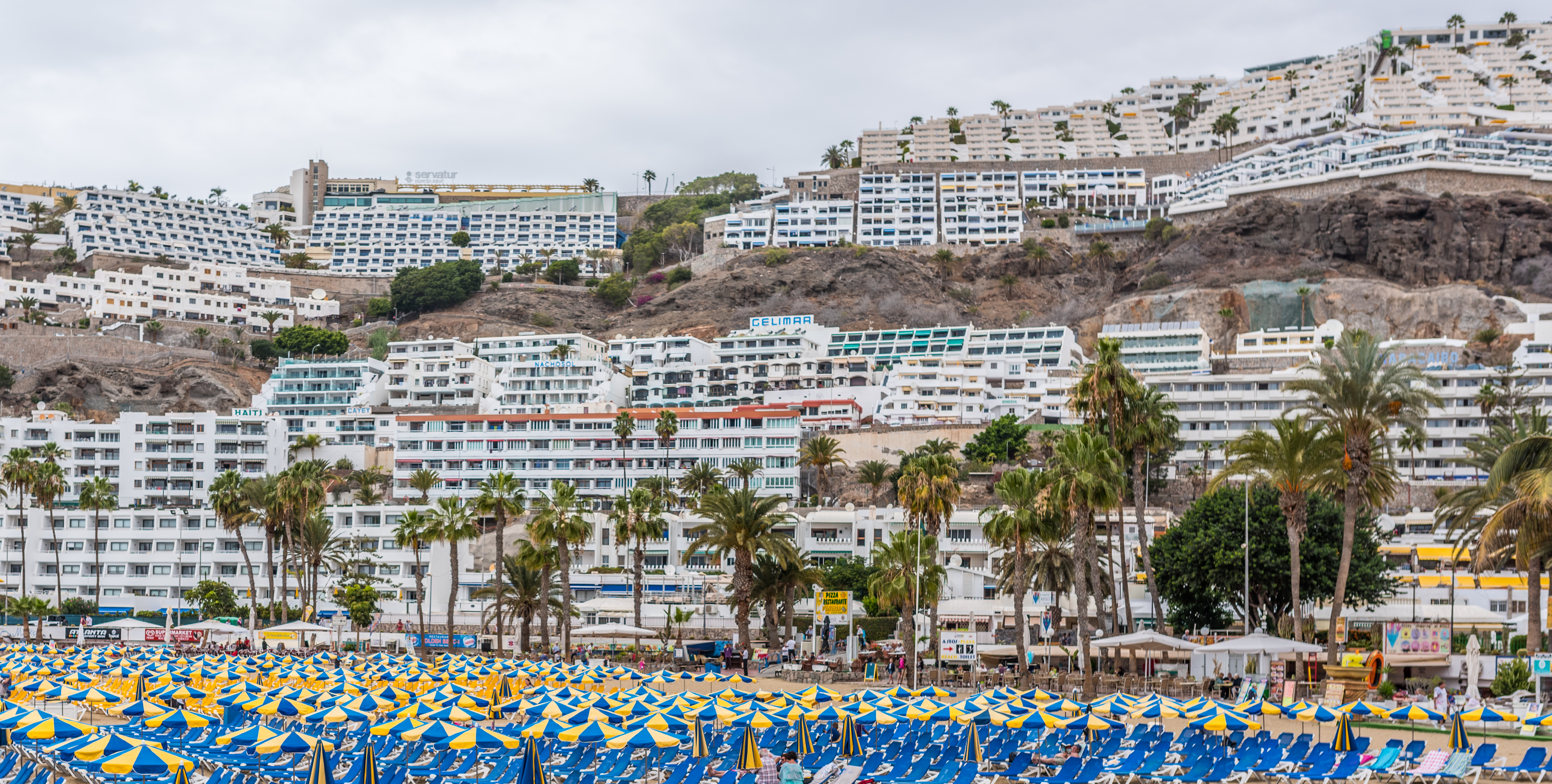
Puerto Rico, February 2018
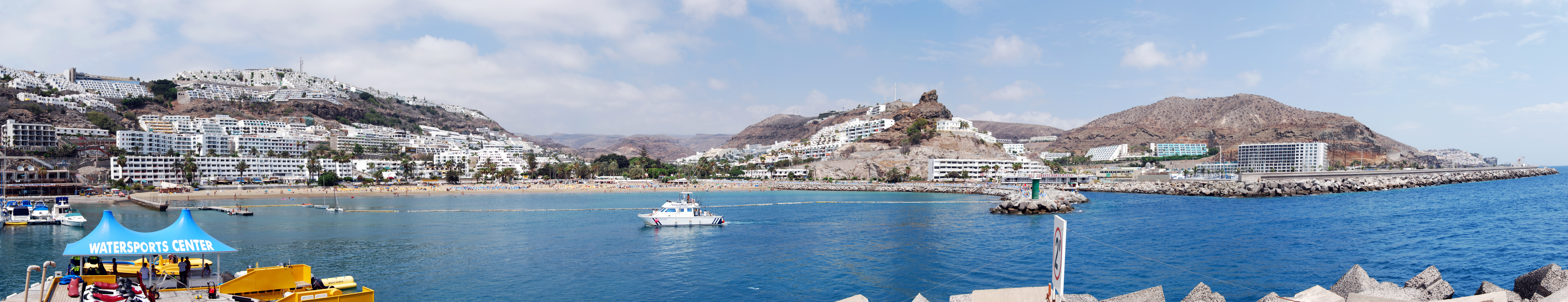
A panorama view of Puerto Rico cove

== Amadores Beach ==
One kilometer northwest of Puerto Rico lies the sister beach of Amadores, a popular tourist destination on the southern coast of Gran Canaria.

== Amadores Beach gallery ==
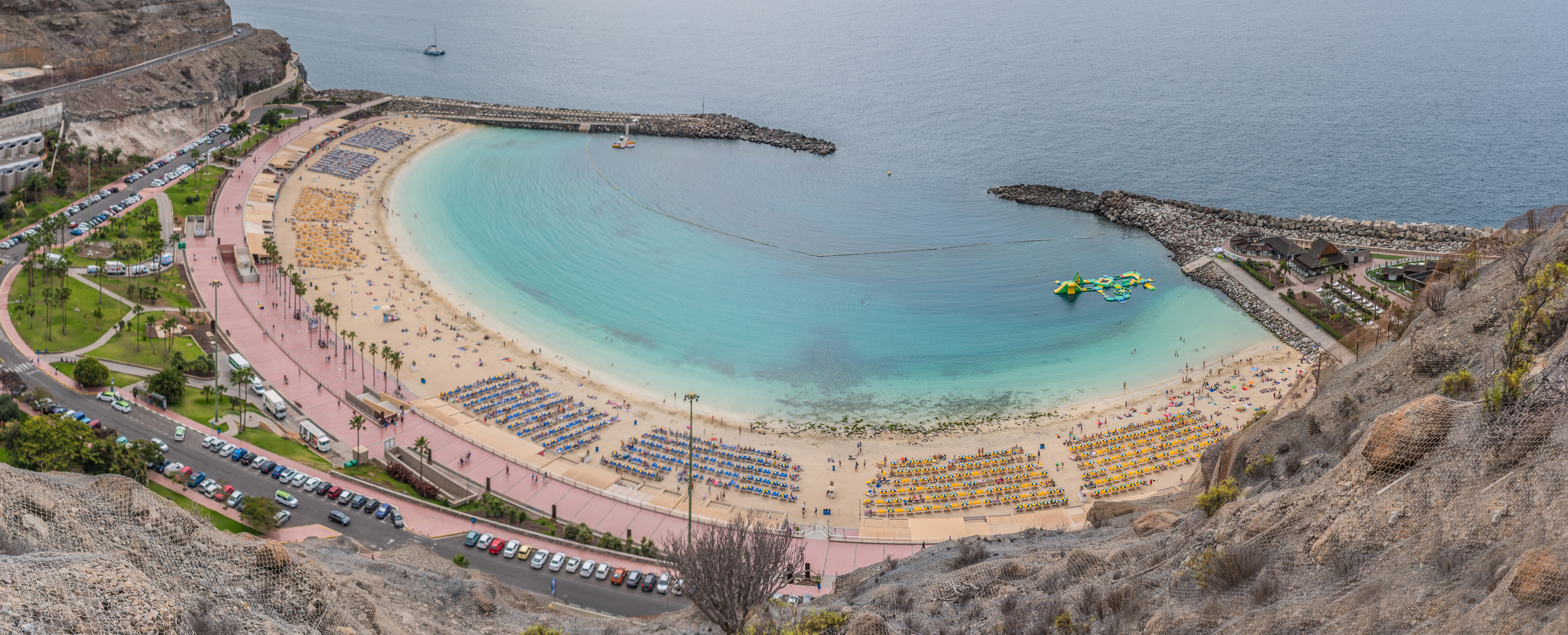
Amadores Beach, February 2018

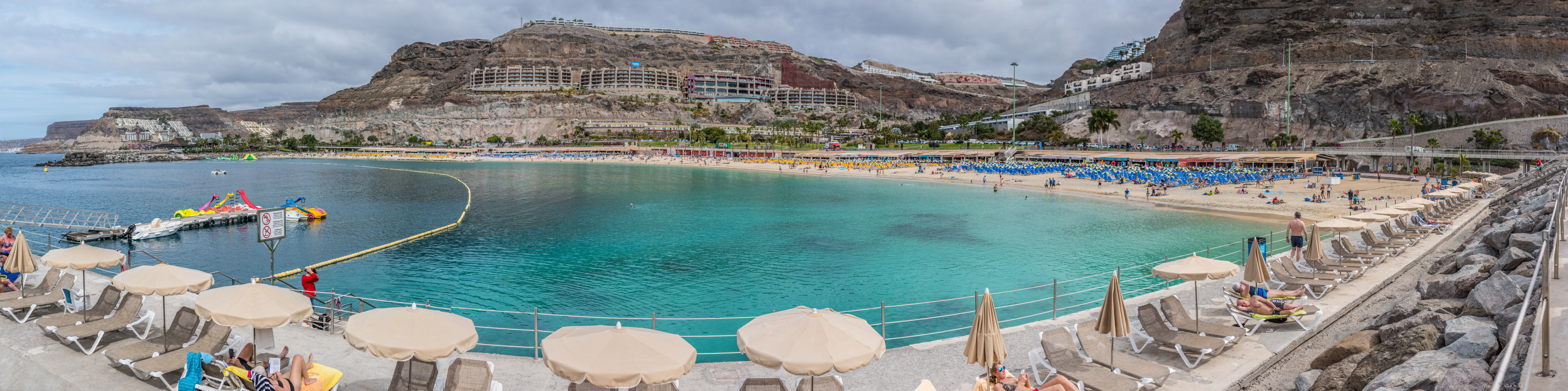
Amadores Beach, February 2018

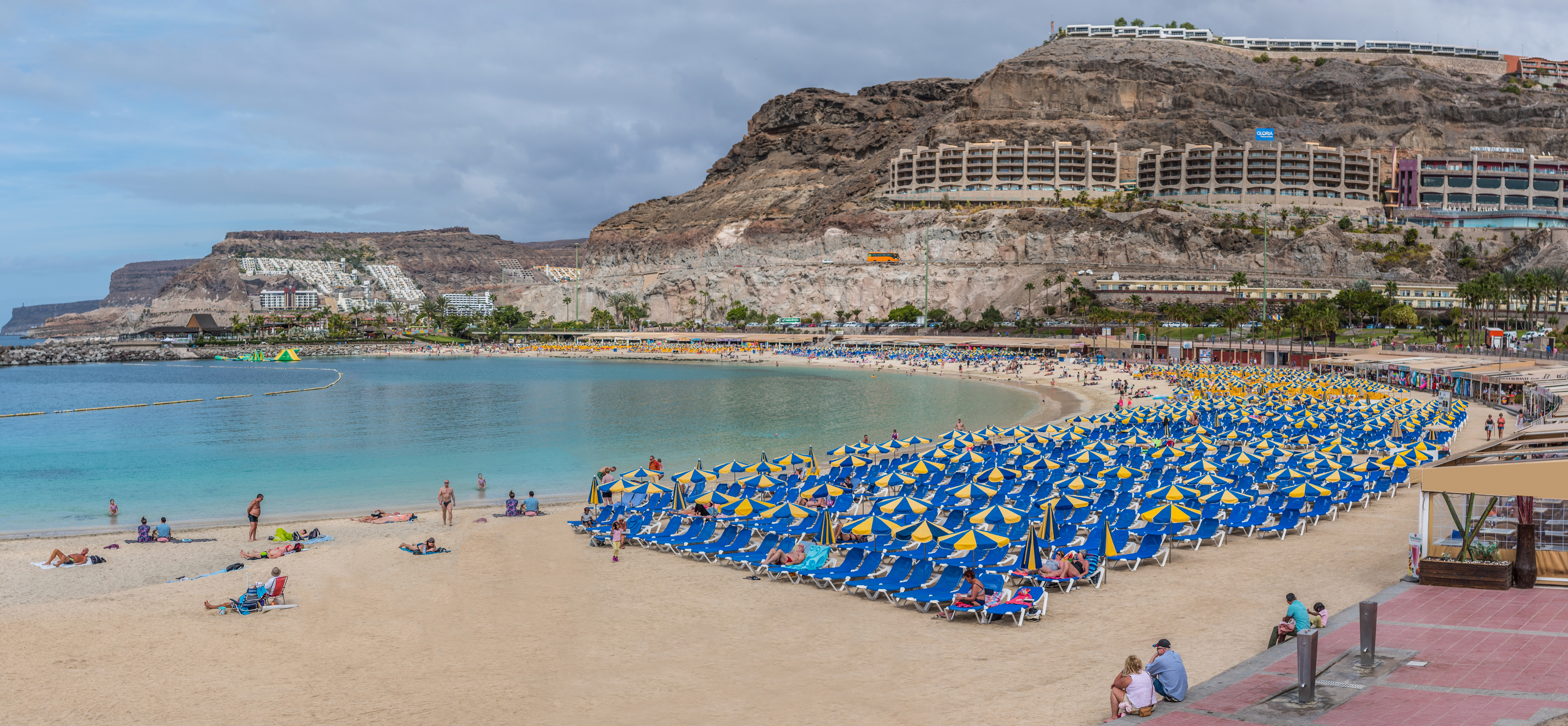
Amadores Beach, February 2018

== Tauro Beach ==
Further northwest located is Tauro Beach.

== Tauro Beach gallery ==
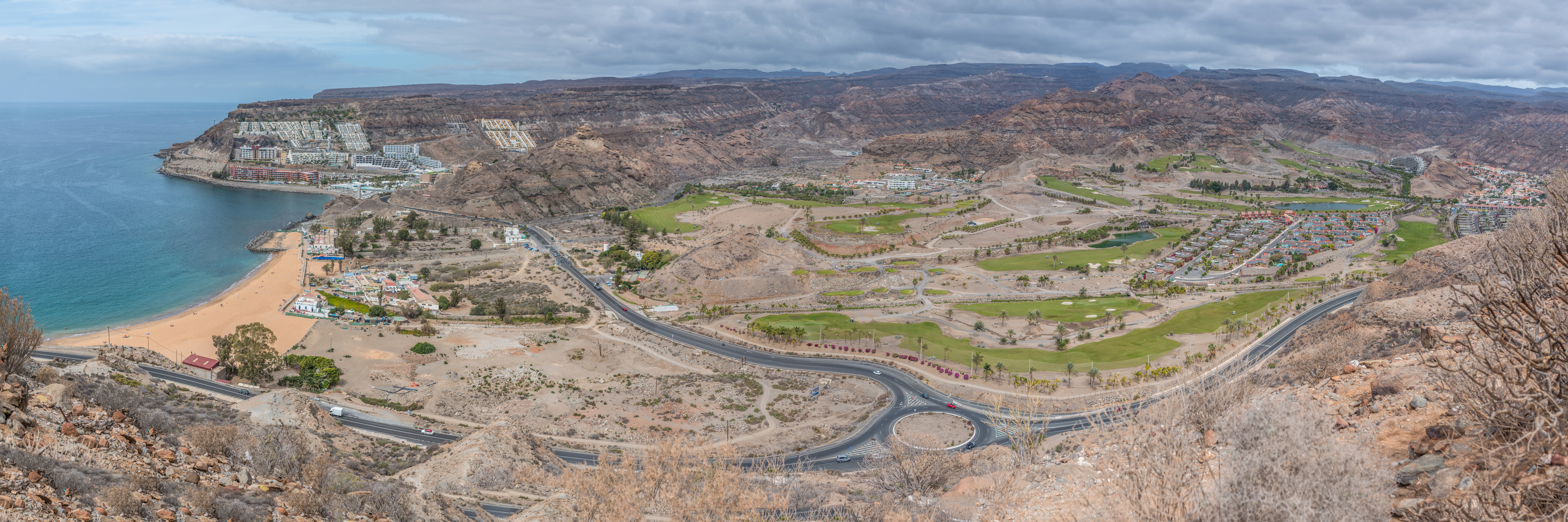
Tauro Beach, 2018

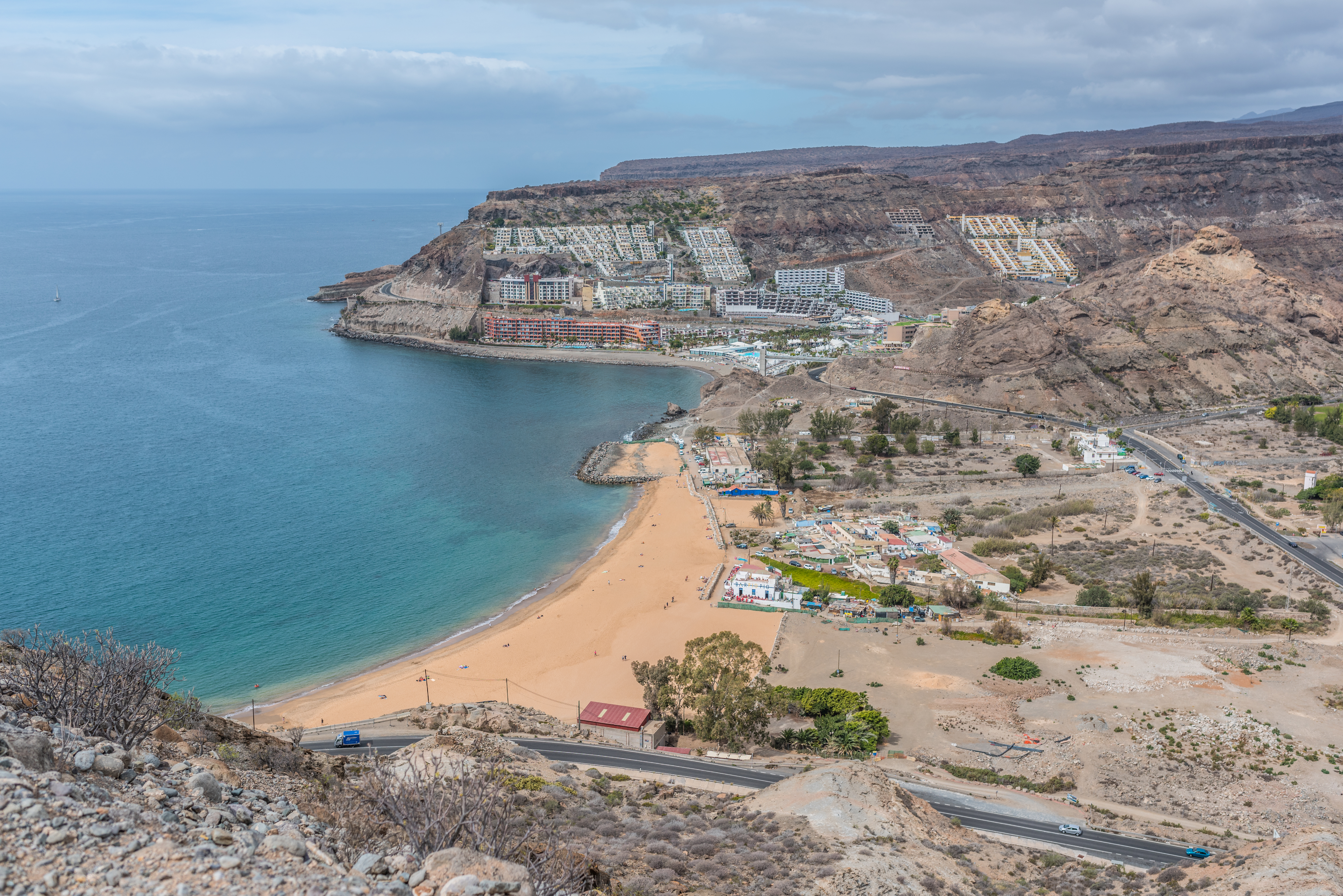
Tauro Beach, 2018
