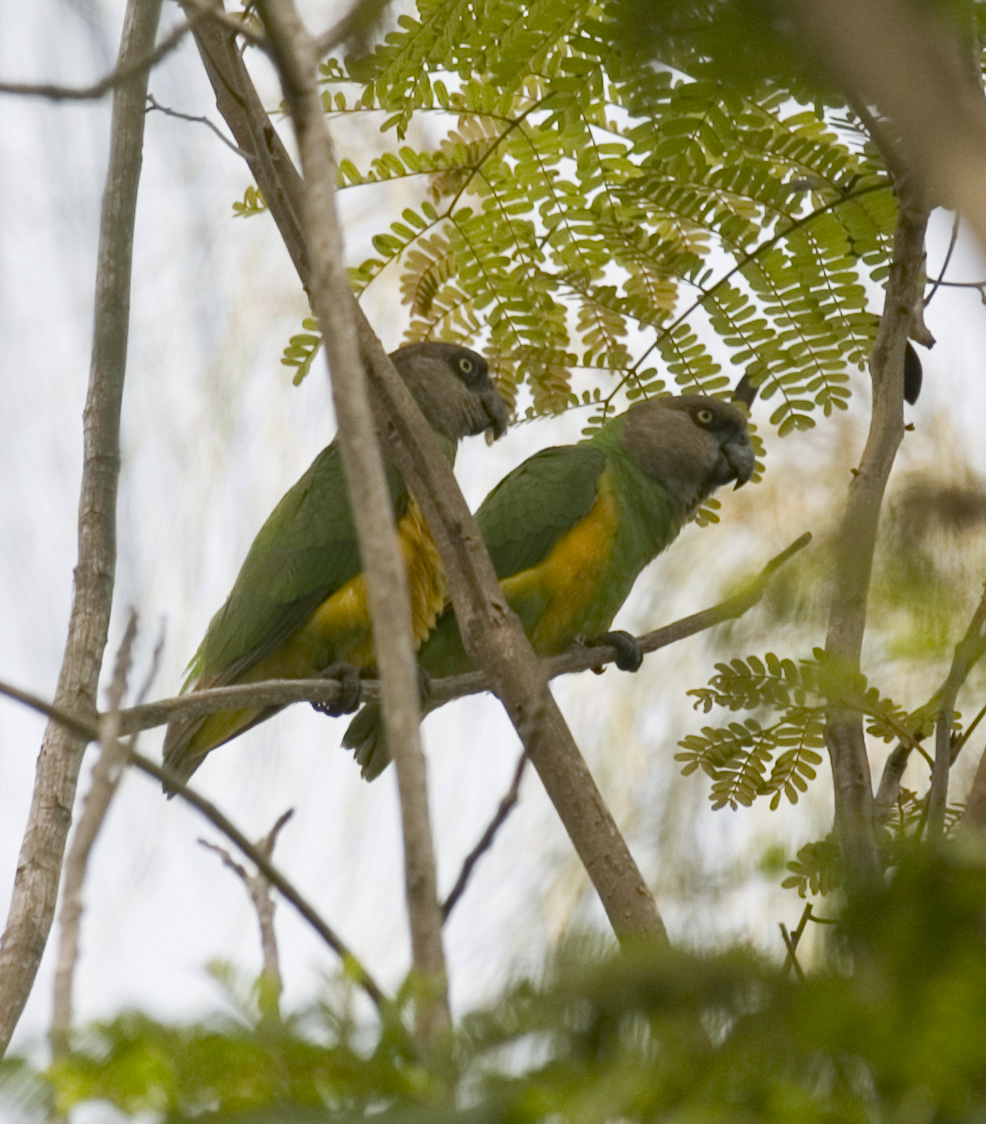
- A pair of Senegal parrots in the wild at Hann Park, Dakar, Senegal

Conservation status
- Least Concern (IUCN 3.1)

Scientific classification
- Kingdom: Animalia
- Phylum: Chordata
- Class: Aves
- Order: Psittaciformes
- Family: Psittacidae
- Genus: Poicephalus
- Species: P. senegalus

Binomial name
- Poicephalus senegalus (Linnaeus, 1766)

Subspecies
- P. s. senegalus; P. s. versteri
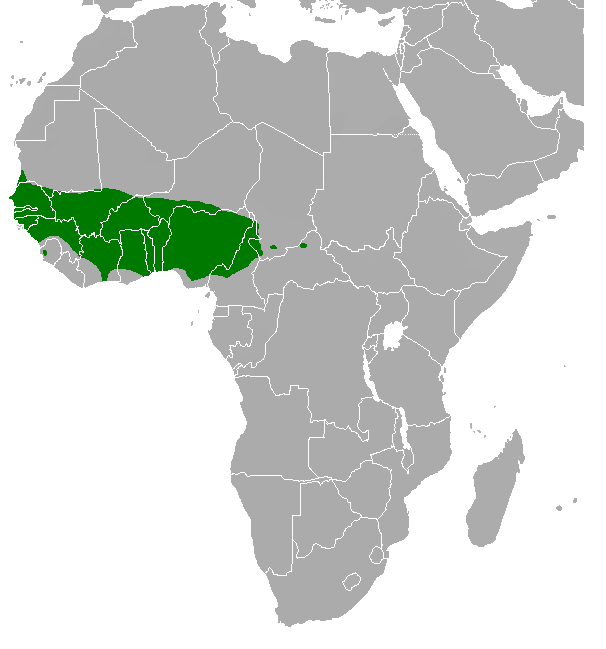
- Range

Synonyms
- Psittacus senegalus Linnaeus, 1766

= Senegal parrot =

Species of bird

The Senegal parrot (Poicephalus senegalus), or youyou, is a parrot which is a resident breeder across a wide range of west Africa. It makes migrations within west Africa, according to the availability of the fruit, seeds and blossoms which make up its diet. It is considered a farm pest in Africa, often feeding on maize or millet. It is popular in aviculture.

== Taxonomy ==
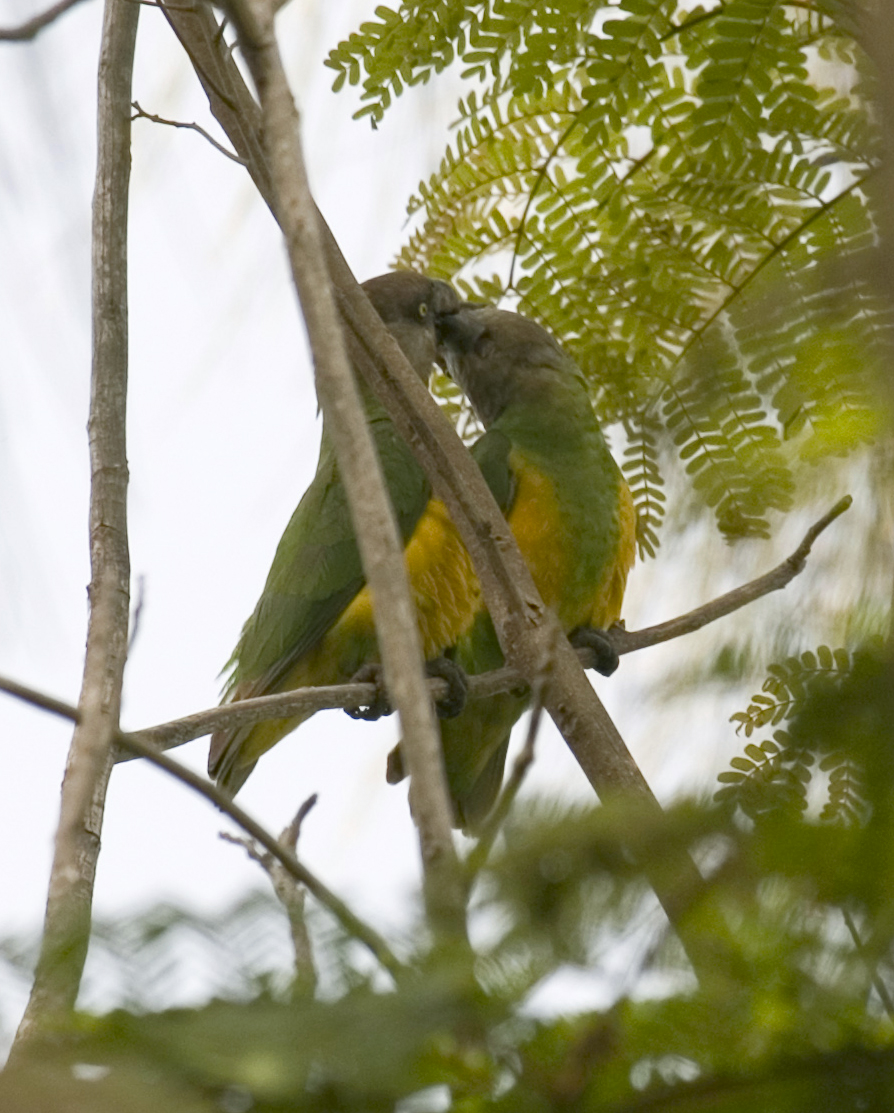
One parrot is feeding the other as part of bonding behaviour between a pair.

In 1760, the French zoologist Mathurin Jacques Brisson included a description of the Senegal parrot in his Ornithologie based on a specimen collected in Senegal. He used the French name La petite perruche du Sénégal and the Latin name Psittacula senegalensis. Although Brisson coined Latin names, these do not conform to the binomial system and are not recognised by the International Commission on Zoological Nomenclature. When in 1766 the Swedish naturalist Carl Linnaeus updated his Systema Naturae for the twelfth edition he added 240 species that had been previously described by Brisson. One of these was the Senegal parrot. Linnaeus included a terse description, coined the binomial name Psittacus senegalus and cited Brisson's work. This species is now placed in the genus Poicephalus which was introduced by the English naturalist William Swainson in 1837.

There are two subspecies.

- P. s. senegalus (the nominate subspecies): this subspecies has a yellow vest; its native range includes Senegal, southern Mauritania, southern Mali to Guinea and Lobos Island.
- P. s. versteri: this subspecies has a deep-orange/red vest; its range is from the Ivory Coast and Ghana east to western Nigeria.

They do not differ in behaviour, but only in the colour of the "vest". In the pet trade, the nominate subspecies is the most common though both are raised and sold as pets.

== Description ==
Senegal parrots are about 23 centimetres (9.1 inches) long, weigh about 120 to 170 grams (4.2 to 6.0 ounces). They have a relatively large head and beak for their overall size, and feathers form a short broad tail. Adults have a charcoal grey head, grey beak, bright yellow irises, green back and throat, and yellow underparts and rump. The yellow and green areas on a Senegal parrot's front form a V-shape resembling a yellow vest worn over green. Young juveniles have dark grey, almost black, irises, which change to light grey.

Senegal parrots are not sexually dimorphic, but there are some hypotheses which sometimes might help to determine the sex of adult birds:

- The V-shape of the vest is usually longer in females; in females the green area extends down over the chest to between the legs, whereas in males the tip of the green area ends midway down the chest.
- The female's beak and head are generally slightly smaller and narrower than the male's.
- The under-tail covert feathers (short feathers under the base of the main tail feathers) are generally mostly yellow in the male and generally mostly green in the female.
- Males are generally, but not always, larger and heavier than female birds.
- DNA testing is another way to determine the sex.

Senegal parrots are birds of open woodland and savanna. They flock most commonly in countries in West Africa. It is a gregarious species, continuously chattering with a range of whistling and squawking calls. Senegal parrots live an average of approximately 25–30 years in the wild, and have been known to live for 50 years in captivity.

Research by Texas State University conducted in southeastern Senegal found that the parrots ate a diet of about 77% fruit, with figs (Ficus sp.), African grapes (Lannea microcarpa), and shea fruits (Vitellaria paradoxa) being the most commonly eaten. Seeds made up about 22% of the diet, and the remaining 1% consisted of flowers.

== Behaviour ==
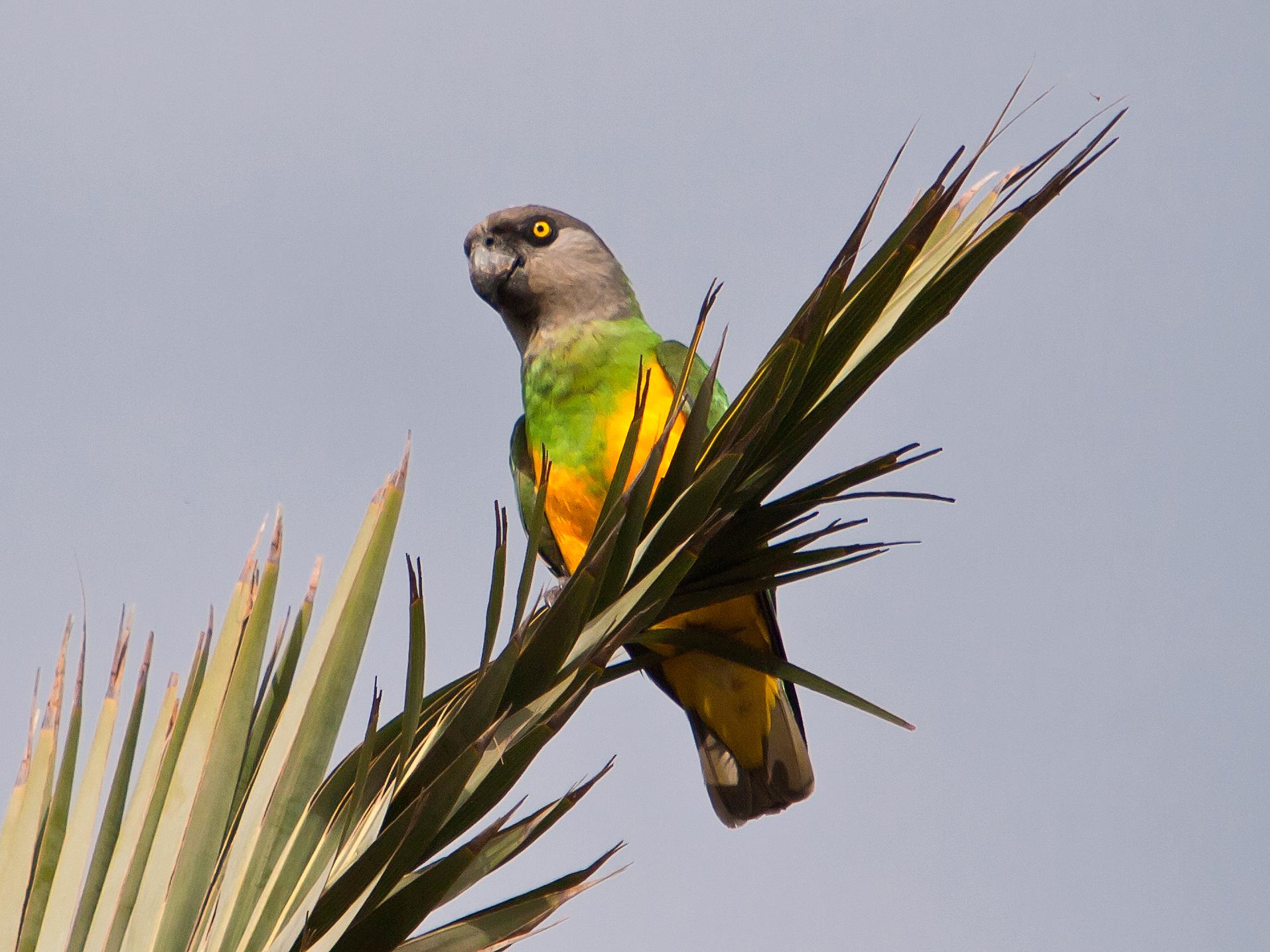
Feral bird in the Canary Islands, Spain

Senegal parrots nest in holes in trees, often oil palms, usually laying three to four white eggs. The eggs are about 3 centimetres (1.2 inches) long by 2.5 centimetres (1 inch) wide. The eggs are incubated by the female, starting after the second egg has been laid, for about 27 to 28 days. Newly hatched chicks have a sparse white down and they do not open their eyes until about two to three weeks after hatching. They are dependent on the female for food and warmth who remains in the nest most of the time until about four weeks after hatching when the chicks have enough feathers for heat insulation. During this time the male brings food for the female and chicks, and guards the nest site. From about two to four weeks after hatching the female also begins to collect food for the chicks. The chicks fly out of the nest at about 9 weeks and they become independent from their parents at about 12 weeks after hatching.

== Conservation status ==
Because of its vast range in Africa, the wild Senegal parrot population is difficult to estimate. Nevertheless, in 1981 concerns about extensive trapping of wild parrots for the pet trade led to it being listed on appendix 2 of The Convention on the International Trade in Endangered Species (CITES), along with all parrot species. This has made the trade, import and export of all wild caught parrots illegal.

== Aviculture ==
=== Pets ===
Hand reared Senegal parrots are one of the most popular parrots to be kept as pets, and the most popular Poicephalus parrot. Their calls are generally high pitched whistles and squawks along with mimics, but they are not as noisy as many other parrot species.

Wild caught Senegal parrots do not usually become tame, and do not make good pets.

=== Breeding ===
Senegal parrots are relatively easy to breed in captivity and there is a small industry in breeding and hand rearing Senegal parrots and other parrots for the pet trade. In aviculture Senegal parrots can start to breed at the age of 3 to 4 years in captivity, but some do not breed until age 5 years. Parent reared birds are known to breed as early as 2 years of age.

Senegal parrot nest boxes can be any of a variety of sizes and shapes; but for example, a nest box about 18 inches (46 centimetres) high and 8 inches (20 centimetres) to 10 inches (25 centimetres) square would be suitable. An exit and entrance port about 2.5 inches (6.4 centimetres) in diameter would be suitable, and the birds may enlarge the port by chewing the wood. Nest boxes generally have a secure side door for inspecting the nest.

== Gallery ==
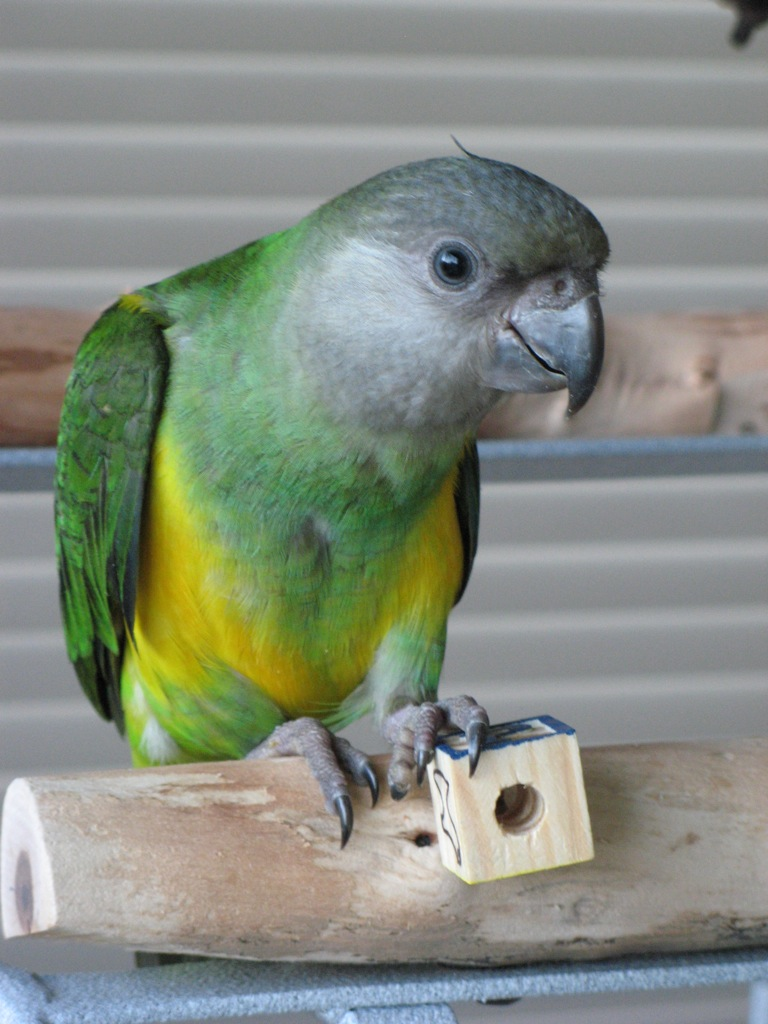
A pet juvenile. Its irises are grey.

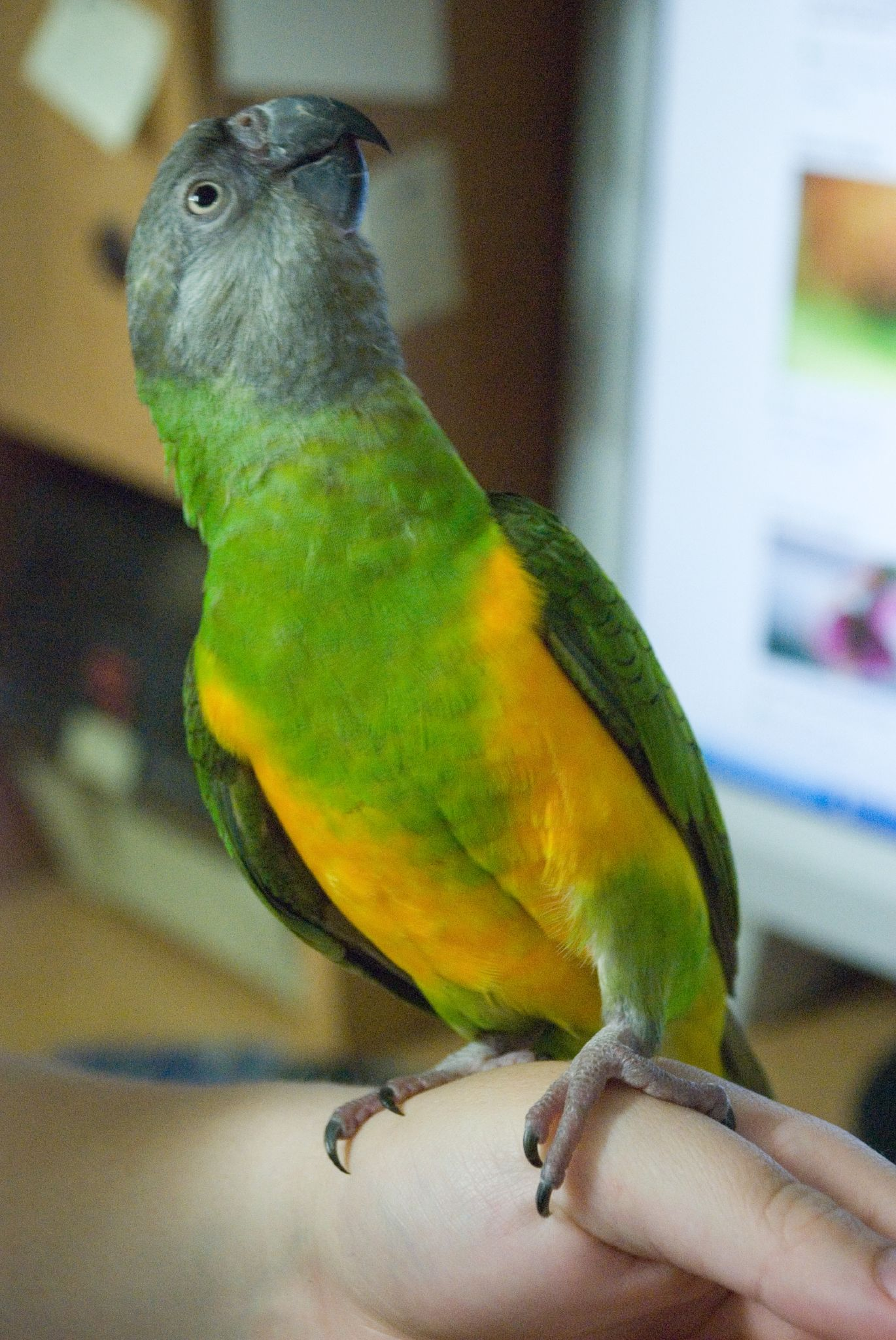
Pet looking upwards

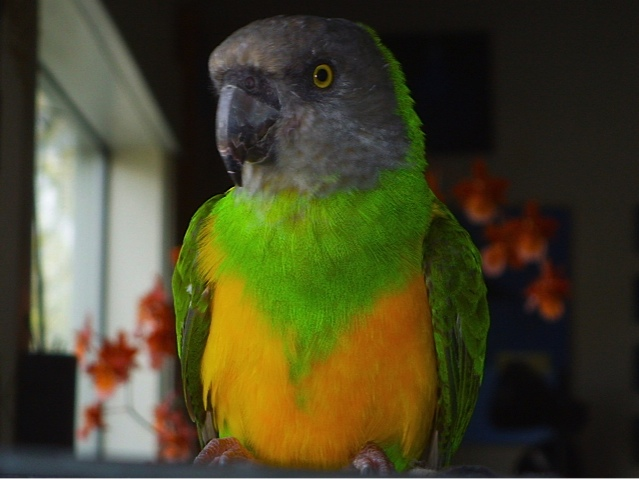
A pet adult showing yellow irises

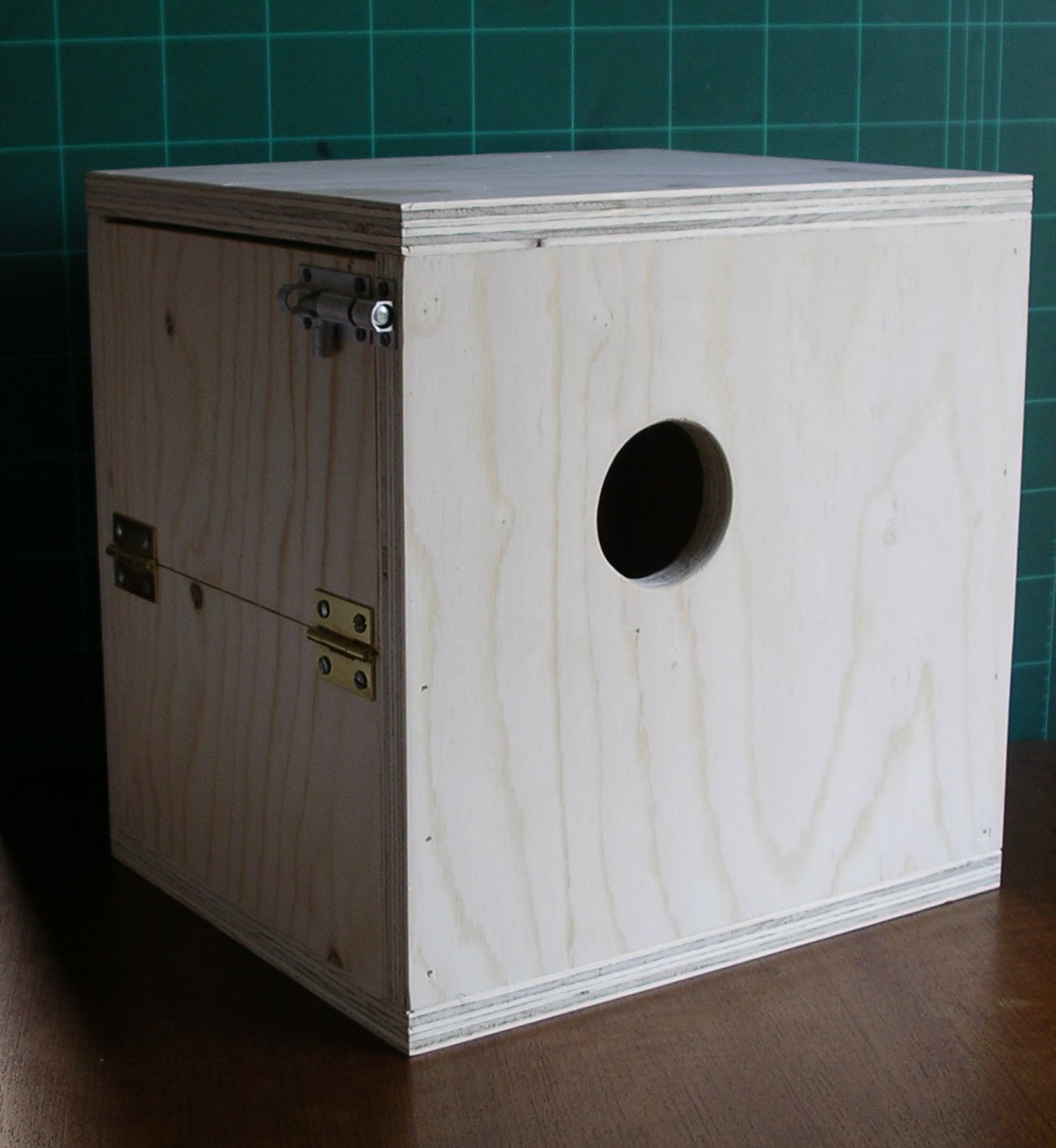
Senegal parrot nest box

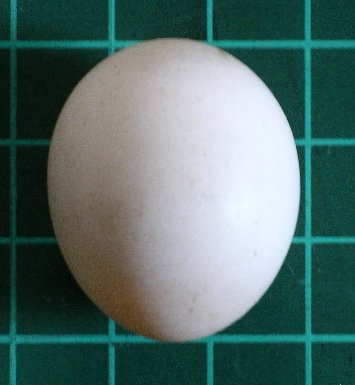
Senegal parrot egg
(on 1 cm grid)

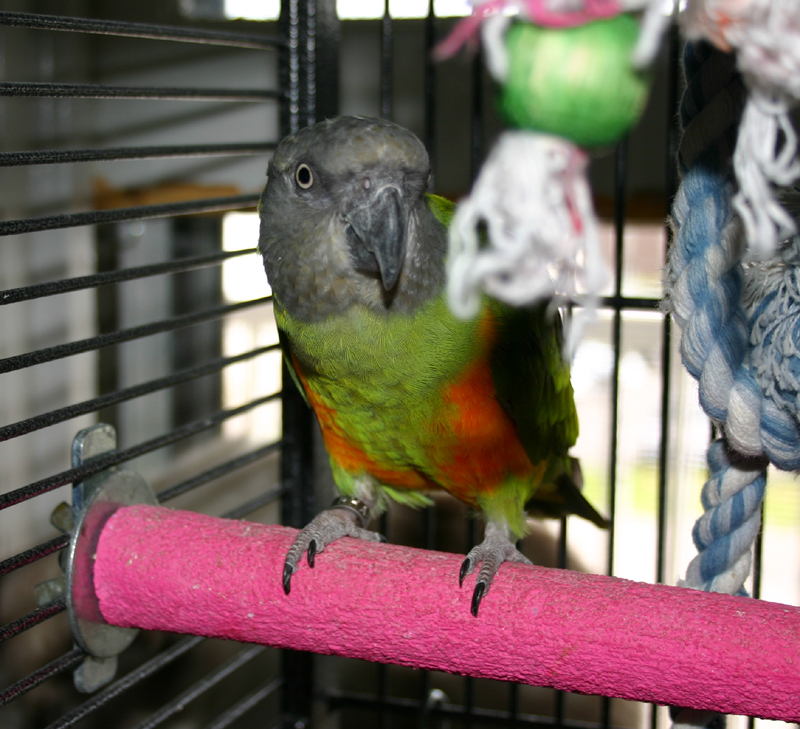
Pet parrot in a cage with toys. The perch is made from a hard material in an attempt to wear down the tips of claws. However, these types of perches tend to cause lesions on the bottoms of the feet and are not very effective at keeping the nails short.
