= Pechiguera Lighthouse =

Lighthouse on Lanzarote, Spain

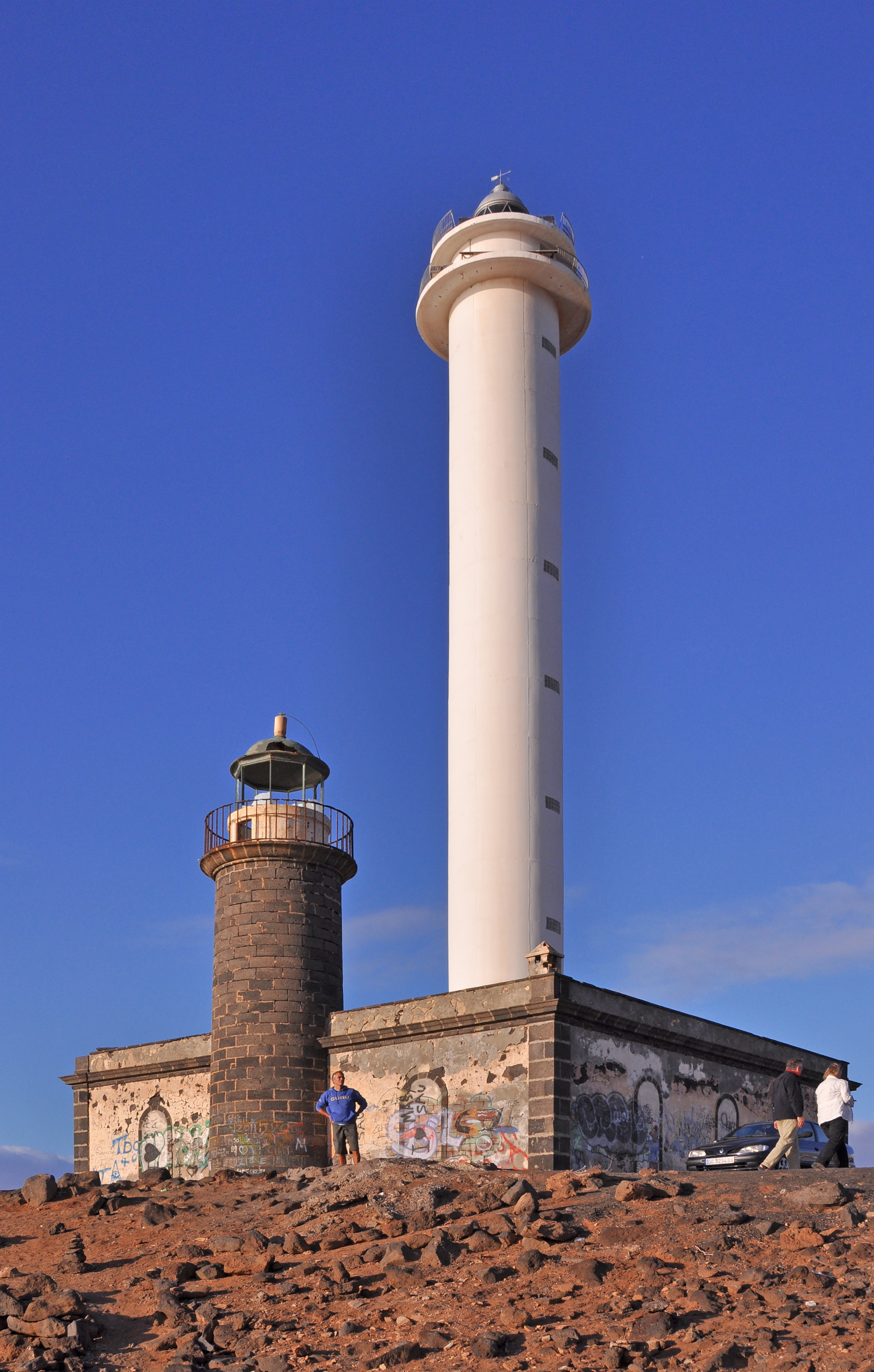
- The original and current lighthouses
- Location: Playa Blanca; Lanzarote; Canary Islands; Spain
- Coordinates: 28.8558°N 13.8726°W

Tower
- Constructed: 1866 (first)
- Construction: concrete tower (current) stone tower (first)
- Height: 50 metres (160 ft) (current); 10 metres (33 ft) (first)
- Shape: cylindrical tower with double balcony and lantern (current) cylindrical tower with balcony and lantern (first)
- Markings: white tower, grey lantern dome (current) unpainted tower, grey lantern dome (first)
- Operator: Autoridad Portuaria de Las Palmas de Gran Canaria
- Heritage: Bien de Interés Cultural

Light
- First lit: 1988 (current)
- Deactivated: 1988 (first)
- Focal height: 55 metres (180 ft) (current)
- Range: 17 nautical miles (31 km; 20 mi)
- Characteristic: Fl (3) W 30s.
- Spain no.: ES-12129

The Pechiguera or Punta Pechiguera Lighthouse (Spanish: Faro de Pechiguera) is an active lighthouse on the Canary island of Lanzarote. It is the second lighthouse to be built at Punta Pechiguera, which is at the south-western end of the island.

== History ==
The original lighthouse which was designed by the engineer Juan de León y Castillo opened in 1866, and consists of a 10 metres (33 ft) tower at the front of a single storey keeper's house. It was deactivated in 1988, following the construction of the new lighthouse, and in 2002 was registered as a Bien de Interés Cultural in the listing for Las Palmas.

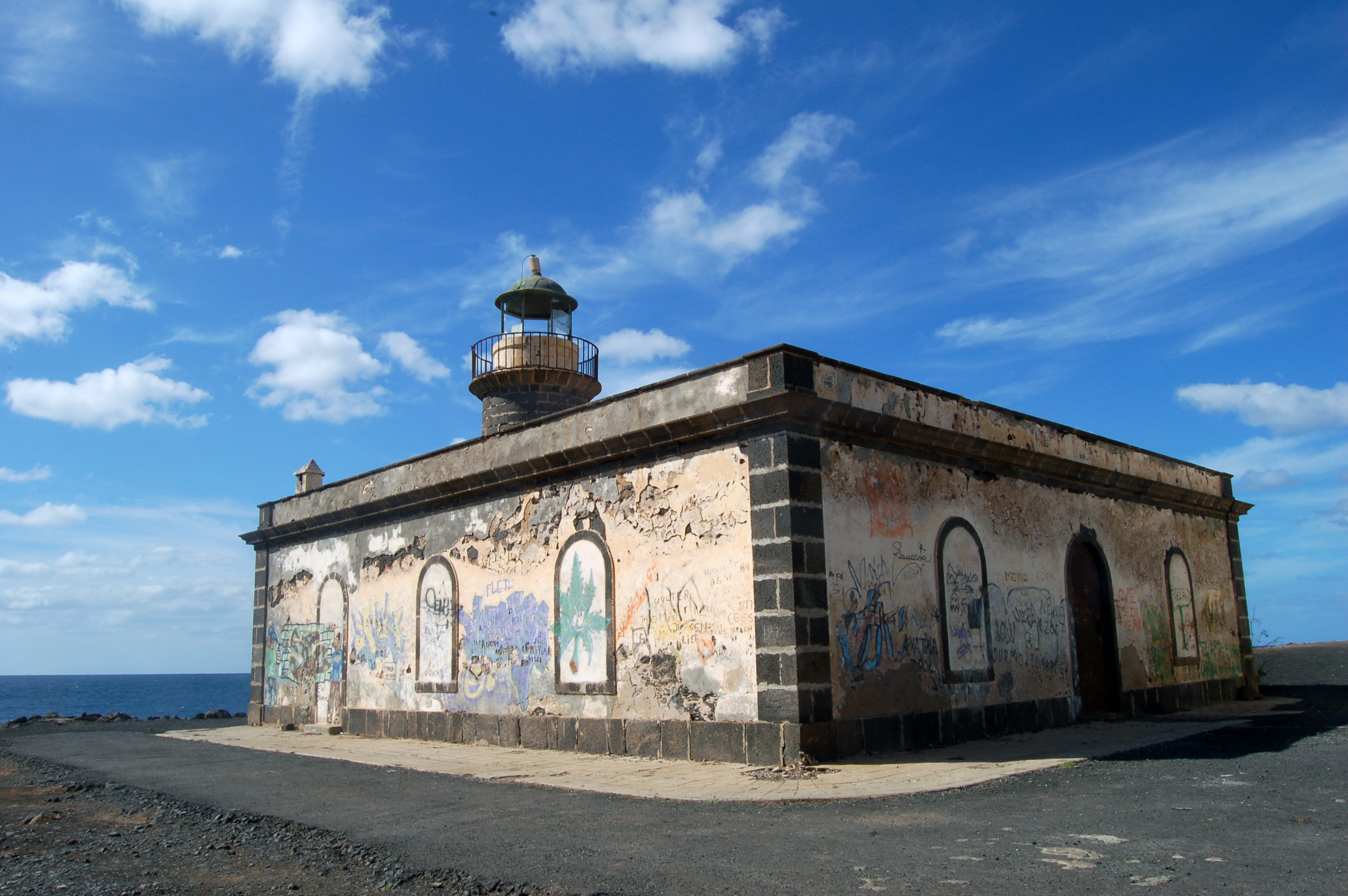
Detail of the 1866 lighthouse

The new lighthouse built from white stone, is one of the tallest lighthouses in the Canaries at 50 metres (160 ft) in height, being superseded only by Maspalomas Lighthouse on Gran Canaria at 56 metres (184 ft), and the 59 metres (194 ft) Morro Jable Lighthouse on Fuerteventura.

With a focal height of 55 metres (180 ft) above the sea, its light can be seen for 17 nautical miles and consists of three flashes of white light every thirty seconds. In conjunction with the lights at Tostón and Punta Martiño, it marks the narrow La Bocayna strait that separates the islands of Lanzarote and Fuerteventura.

Punta Pechiguera is a barren promontory of volcanic rocks; originally quite isolated it is now being encroached upon by coastal developments from the Playa Blanca resort. A coastal walkway links the lighthouse with the centre of the resort, the majority of which consists of a paved promenade or esplanade (Spanish: paseo maritimo) along the seafront.

In 2008, Pechiguera in conjunction with five other lighthouses was depicted in a set of six commemorative stamps by the Spanish postal service Correos.

== See also ==
- List of lighthouses in the Canary Islands
- List of lighthouses in Spain
