= La Bocayna =

- Estrecho de la Bocayna (Spanish)
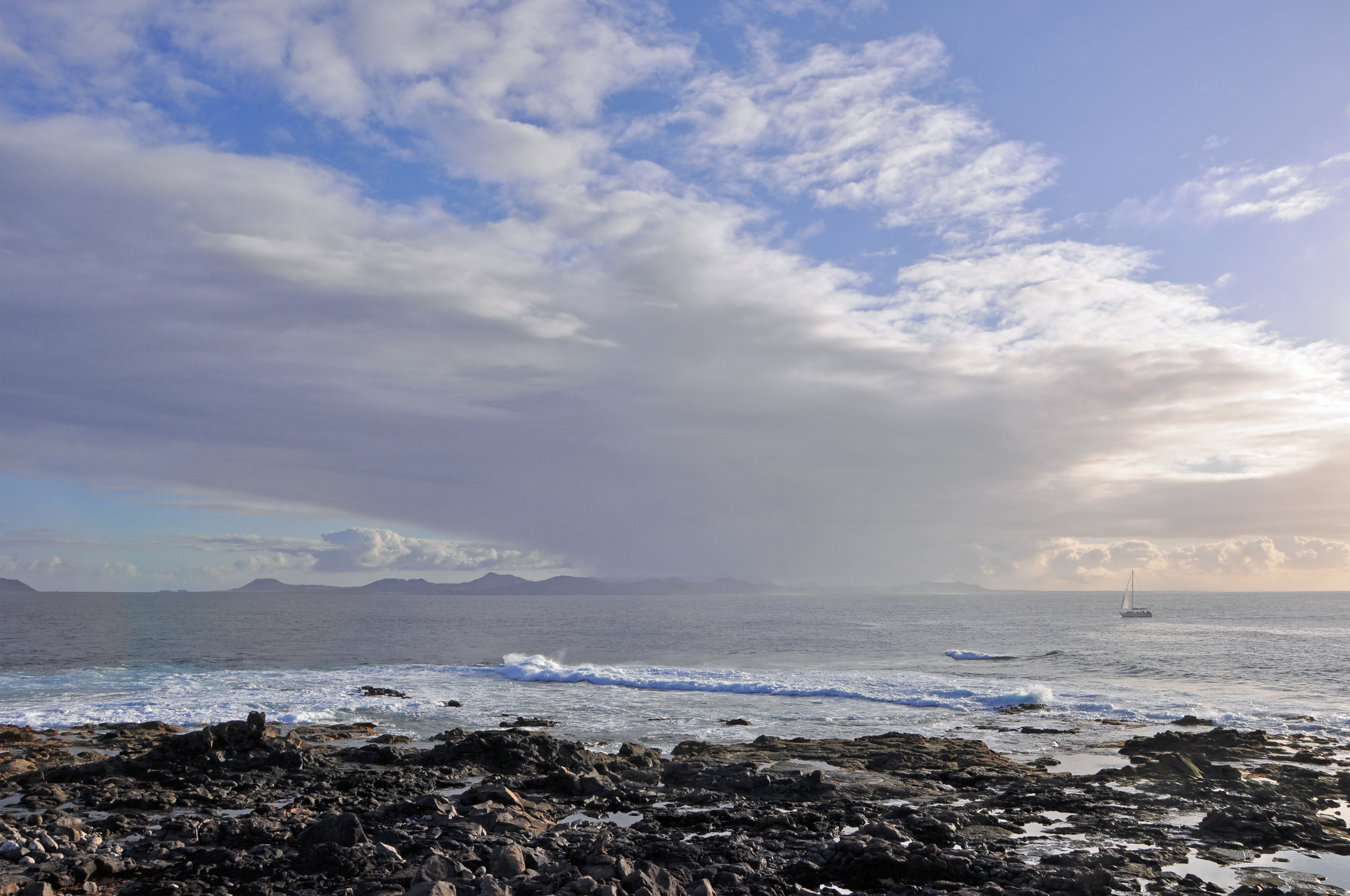

- Location within Province of Las Palmas
- Location: Between Lanzarote and Fuerteventura
- Coordinates: 28°48′00″N 13°48′00″W
- Type: Strait
- Ocean/sea sources: Atlantic Ocean
- Basin countries: Spain
- Min. width: 11 km (6.8 mi; 5.9 nmi)
- Islands: Lobos Island
- Settlements: Corralejo and Playa Blanca

La Bocayna or La Bocaina (Spanish: Estrecho de la Bocaina) is a sea strait that separates Lanzarote from Fuerteventura in the Canary Islands. The island of Lobos is situated on the southern side of the strait, close to Fuerteventura.

In the 19th century, the strait was known as a safe anchorage with a sandy bottom, which shelved gradually towards Lanzarote with depths of up to five fathoms. The shore around Lobos was less hospitable, being ‘foul and rocky’. A steady trade wind could be found in the strait, although it was blocked by the hills of Lanzarote, becalming ships that were in their lee, tacking towards Lobos was needed to regain the wind.

Large breakers were observed by one ship’s captain, produced by a heavy westerly swell. Waves up to 18 metres (60 ft) high were seen breaking on the northern point of Lobos, the sound of the waves could be heard up to six or seven leagues away.

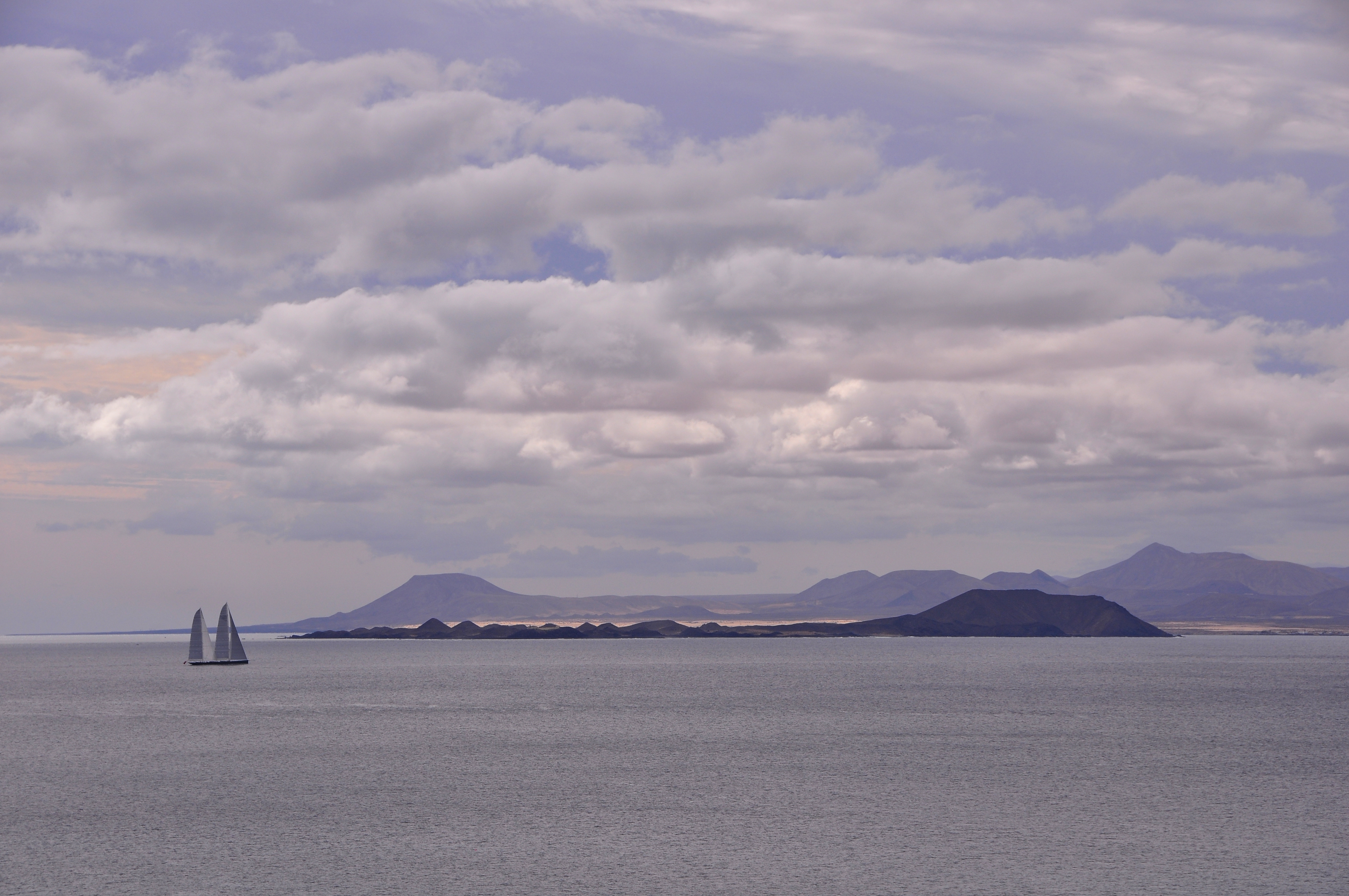
View of La Bocayna strait, with Lobos, and Fuerteventura beyond

== Lighthouses ==
The strait is marked by a number of lighthouses including Punta Martiño on Lobos, Pechiguera at the south western end of Lanzarote, and Tostón on the north western side of Fuerteventura.

== Ferries ==
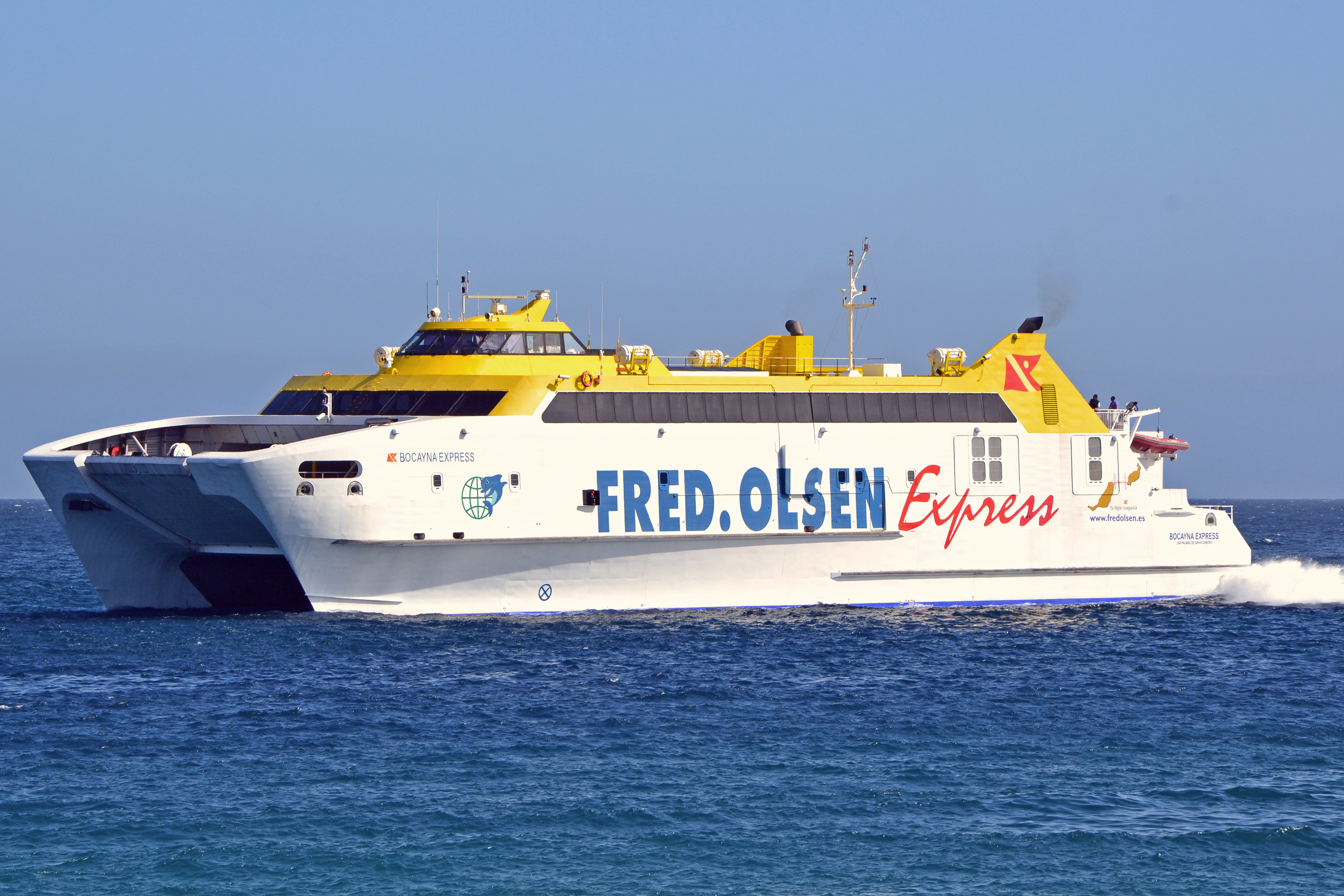
Bocayna Express Ferry

A high speed ferry service runs across the strait, using the catamaran Bocayna Express. The crossing time is 20 minutes. The Fred. Olsen Express line has operated the service since 2003 between Playa Blanca in Lanzarote and Corralejo in Fuerteventura.

Naviera Armas operates a competing service with its larger but slower vessel, Volcán de Tindaya, covering the same route in 35 minutes.

== Open water swimming ==
The Travesia La Bocaina is an annual open water swimming endurance event that crosses the strait. Depending on the speed of the swimmers it can take between five and eight hours to complete the swim from Playa Blanca to Corralejo, over a distance of 15 kilometres (9.3 mi; 8.1 nmi).
