= Morro Jable Lighthouse =

Lighthouse on Fuerteventura, Spain

Morro Jable Lighthouse Jandía
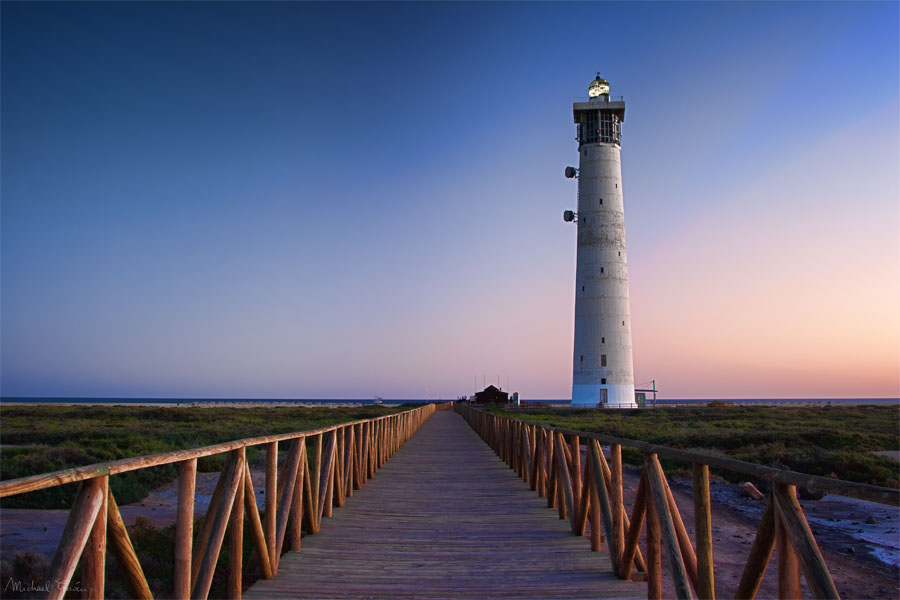
- Location: Morro Jable; Fuerteventura; Canary Islands; Spain
- Coordinates: 28.046199°N 14.333007°W

Tower
- Constructed: 1991
- Construction: Concrete tower
- Height: 59 metres (194 ft)
- Shape: Tapered cylindrical tower with balcony, lantern and observation room under the balcony
- Markings: White tower
- Power source: mains electricity
- Operator: Autoridad Portuaria de Las Palmas de Gran Canaria

Light
- Focal height: 62 metres (203 ft)
- Lens: Fresnel Lens
- Range: 17 nautical miles (31 km; 20 mi)
- Characteristic: Fl (2) W 5s.
- Spain no.: ES-12198

The Morro Jable Lighthouse (Spanish: Faro de Morro Jable) is an active lighthouse on the Canary island of Fuerteventura. The lighthouse is situated at the edge of the beach near the town and resort of Morro Jable.

== Description ==
Completed in 1991 this is the tallest lighthouse in the Canaries with a 59 m tower, which is higher than that of the Maspalomas Lighthouse on Gran Canaria at 56 m, and that of Pechiguera on Lanzarote at 50 m.

With a focal height of 62 m above the sea, its light can be seen for 17 nautical miles, and consists of two flashes of white light every 10 seconds.

It is sometimes confused with the older 19th century Punta Jandía lighthouse (Spanish: Faro de Punta Jandía) which lies 22 km away by road at the extreme western end of the Jandia peninsula.

Map showing the principal lighthouses of Fuerteventura

== See also ==
- List of lighthouses in Spain
- List of lighthouses in the Canary Islands
- List of tallest lighthouses in the world
