= Tostón Lighthouse =

Lighthouse on Fuerteventura, Spain

Tostón Lighthouse Punta de la Ballena
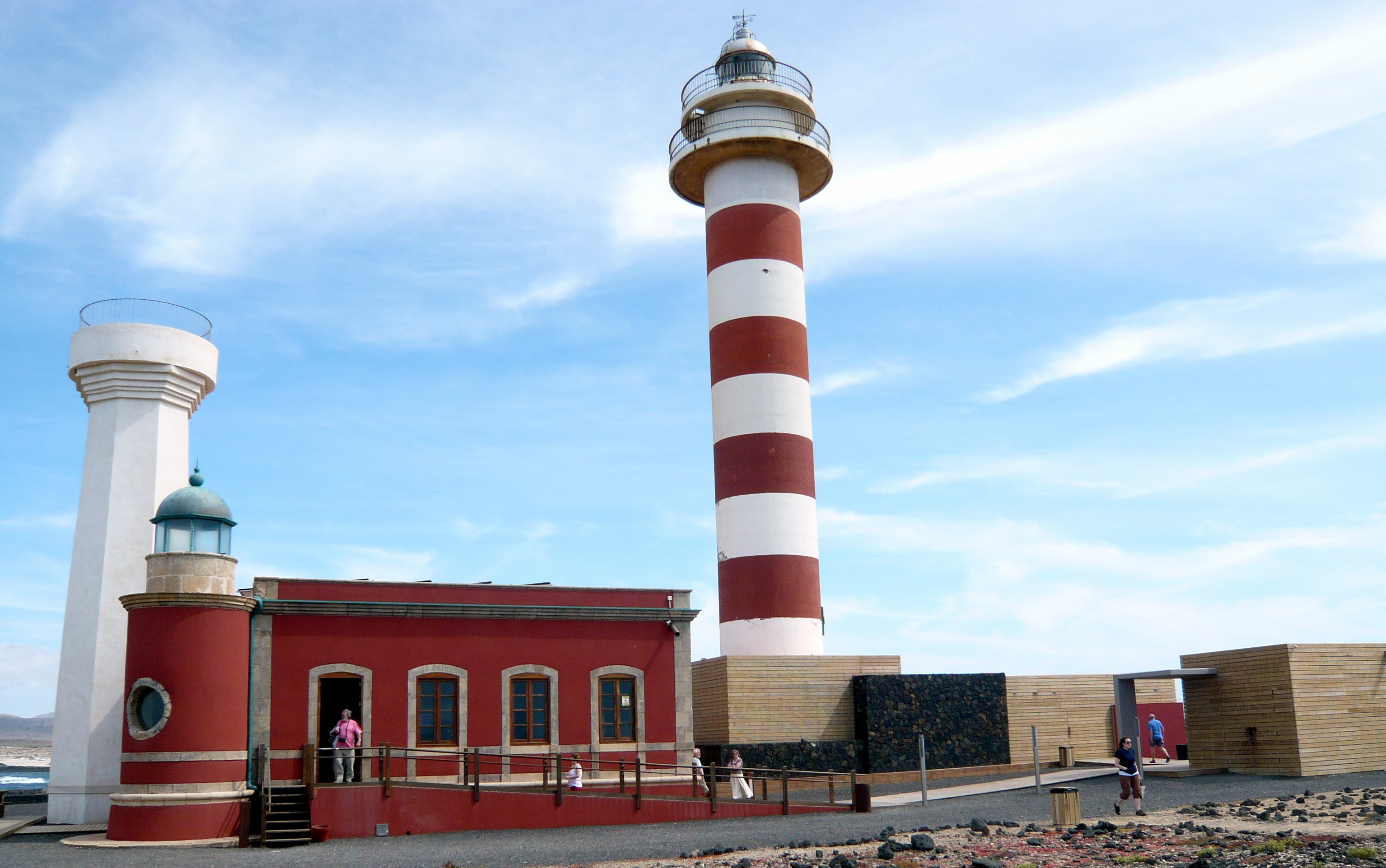
- The three towers of Tostón Lighthouse
- Location: El Cotillo; Fuerteventura; Canary Islands; Spain
- Coordinates: 28.715561°N 14.013810°W

Tower
- Constructed: 1897 (first); 1950s (second)
- Construction: concrete tower (current)
- Height: 30 metres (98 ft) (current); 7 metres (23 ft) (first); 15 metres (49 ft) (second)
- Shape: cylindrical tower with double balcony and lantern (current)
- Markings: red and white bands, grey lantern dome (current)
- Operator: Autoridad Portuaria de Las Palmas de Gran Canaria

Light
- First lit: 1986 (current)
- Deactivated: 1986 (second)
- Focal height: 35 metres (115 ft)
- Range: 17 nautical miles (31 km; 20 mi)
- Characteristic: Fl W 8s.
- Spain no.: ES-12220

The Tostón Lighthouse (Spanish: Faro de Tostón) or El Cotillo Lighthouse is an active lighthouse on the Canary island of Fuerteventura. The lighthouse is situated on the northwestern coast of the island near to the village of El Cotillo, in the municipality of La Oliva. In conjunction with the lights at Pechiguera and Punta Martiño, it marks the narrow La Bocayna strait that separates Fuerteventura from the adjacent island of Lanzarote.

== History ==
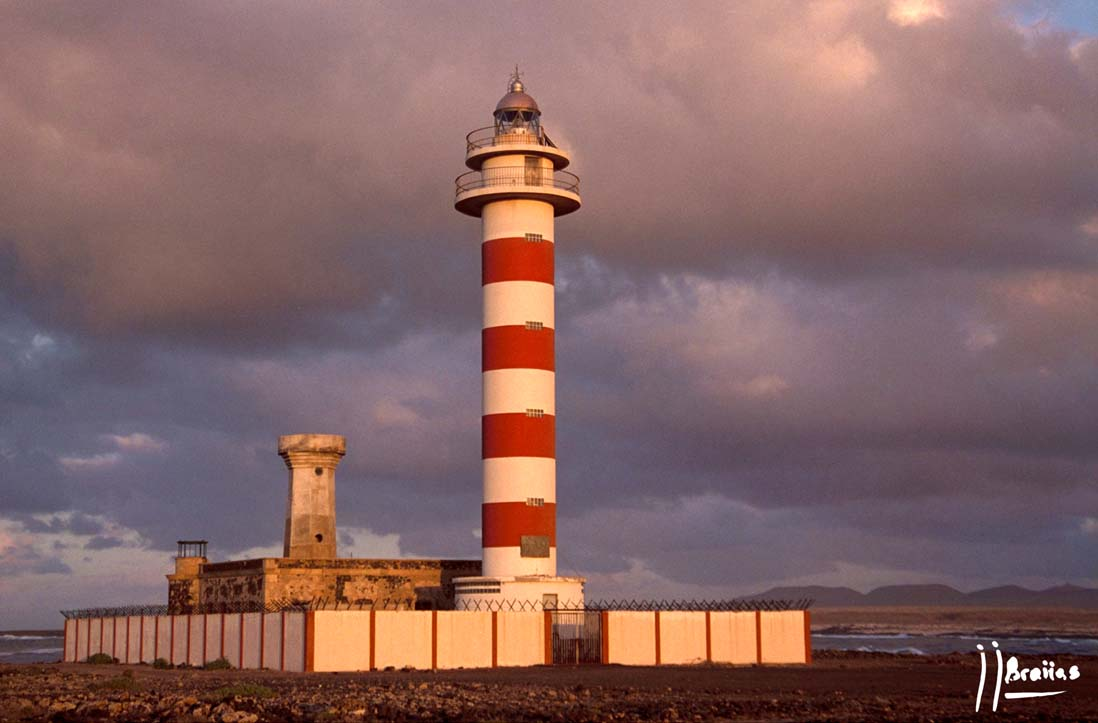
Faro de Tostón in 2007, prior to restoration

The current lighthouse is the third in a succession of lights that have operated at the site on the promontory of Punta Tostón, which is also known as the Punta de la Ballena (whale point).

The original lighthouse was opened in 1897, and consisted of a 7 m high plain masonry tower on one corner of the single storey keeper's house. In the 1950s a new 15-metre concrete tower was constructed, which was also superseded by a taller tower in the 1980s. This distinctive 30 m concrete tower, which is white with red bands, has a focal height of 35 m above the sea. Its light can be seen for 14 nautical miles, and consists of a flash of white light every eight seconds.

The original keeper's house has been renovated and reused as a museum with a small café. Visitors to the museum which contains an exhibition describing the traditional fishing of the island, can also climb to the top of the 1950s concrete tower.

A short c. 1 km self-guided walking trail circles the lighthouse. Multilingual signs describe the geology, shellfish and wildlife found on the headland. Most notable is the description of the Aljibe, a water collection system, next to the road leading to the lighthouse, which was used to provide drinking water for the keepers and their families.

Map showing the principal lighthouses of Fuerteventura

== See also ==
- List of lighthouses in Spain
- List of lighthouses in the Canary Islands
