= Punta Jandía Lighthouse =

Lighthouse on Fuerteventura, Spain

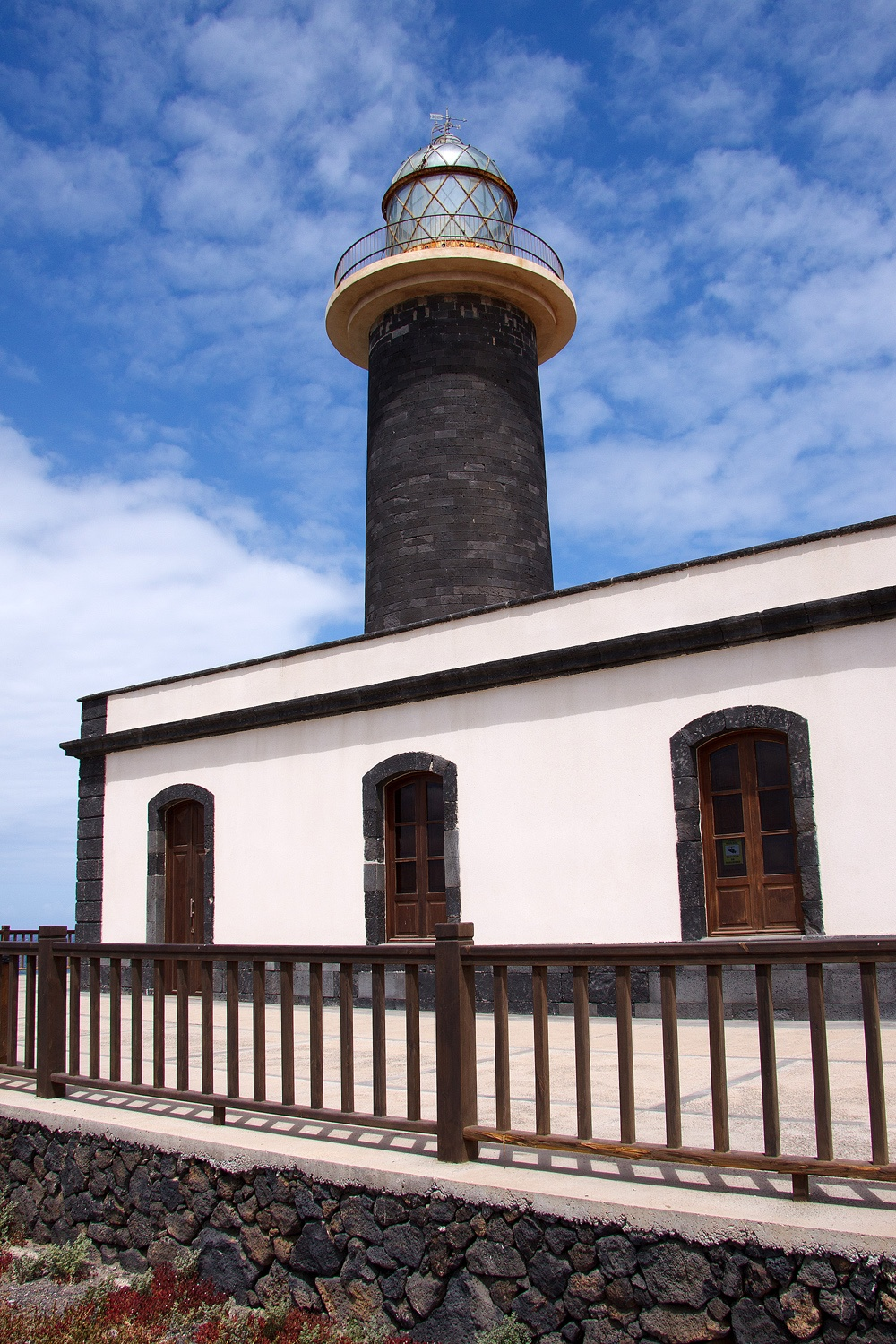
- Location: Jandia; Fuerteventura; Canary Islands; Spain
- Coordinates: 28.065634°N 14.507253°W

Tower
- Constructed: 1864
- Construction: stone tower
- Height: 19 metres (62 ft)
- Shape: cylindrical tower with balcony and lantern
- Markings: unpainted tower, white lantern
- Operator: Autoridad Portuaria de Las Palmas de Gran Canaria

Light
- Focal height: 33 metres (108 ft)
- Range: 22 nautical miles (41 km; 25 mi)
- Characteristic: Fl W 4s.
- Spain no.: ES-12210

The Punta Jandía Lighthouse (Spanish: Faro de Punta Jandía) is an active lighthouse on the Canary island of Fuerteventura. The name derives from its location on the Punta de Jandía (Point of Jandía), at the end of the much larger Jandía peninsula, which forms the south west part of the island.

It is sometimes confused with the more recent Morro Jable lighthouse, which is also on the Jandía peninsula, but lies 22 km (14 mi) to the east, near the town of Morro Jable.

== History ==
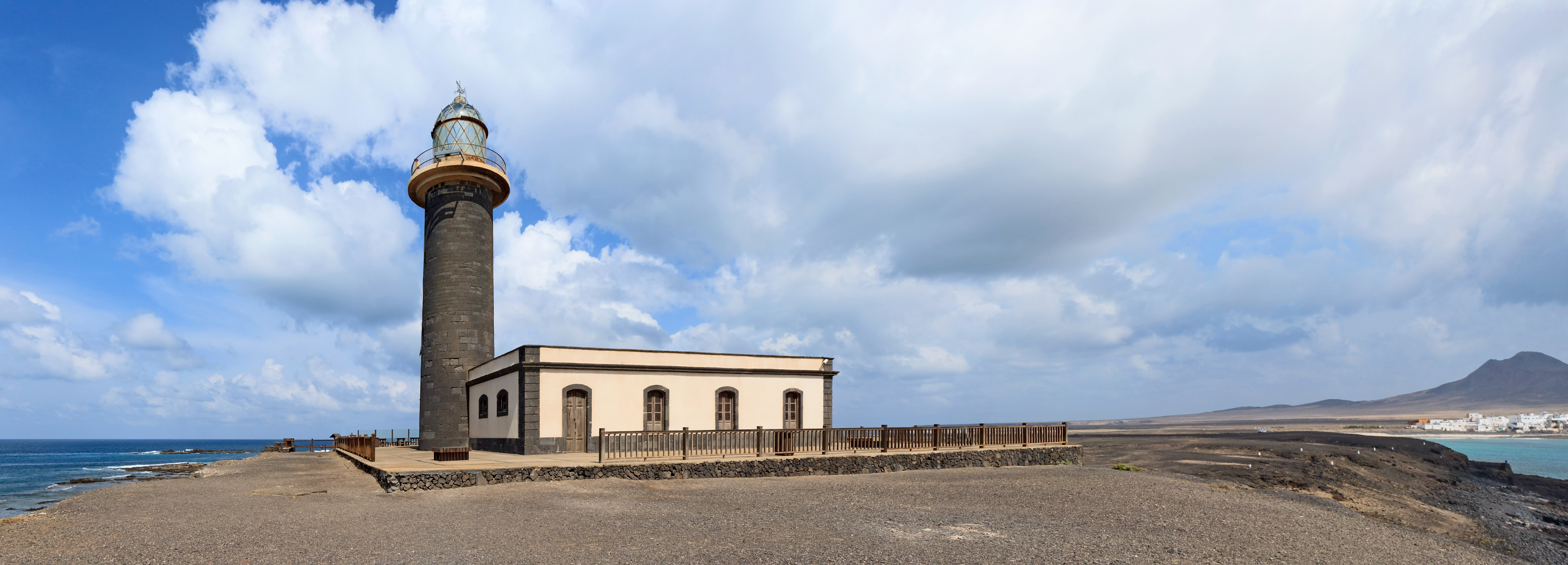
Punta Jandia in 2017

Completed in 1864, it is one of the oldest lighthouses in the Canaries; Punta de Anaga Lighthouse on Tenerife was also opened in the same year.

Built in a similar style to other Canarian 19th century lights, it consists of a whitewashed single storey house, with dark volcanic rock used for the masonry detailing. A 19 m masonry tower is attached to the side of the house facing the Atlantic Ocean.

With a focal height of 33 m above the sea, its light can be seen for 22 nautical miles, and consists of a flash of white light every four seconds.

The interior of the keeper's house has been converted into an interpretation centre for the Jandía nature reserve. There are five different coloured rooms, each one displaying information about a particular aspect of the reserve, such as its volcanic geology, vegetation, animals and maritime life, which also includes information about the lighthouse.

The lighthouse is maintained by the Las Palmas Port authority. It is registered under the international Admiralty number D2790 and has the NGA identifier of 113–24024.

== Map ==
Map showing the principal lighthouses of Fuerteventura

== See also ==
- List of lighthouses in Spain
- List of lighthouses in the Canary Islands
