= Punta Martiño Lighthouse =

Lighthouse on Lobos Island, Spain

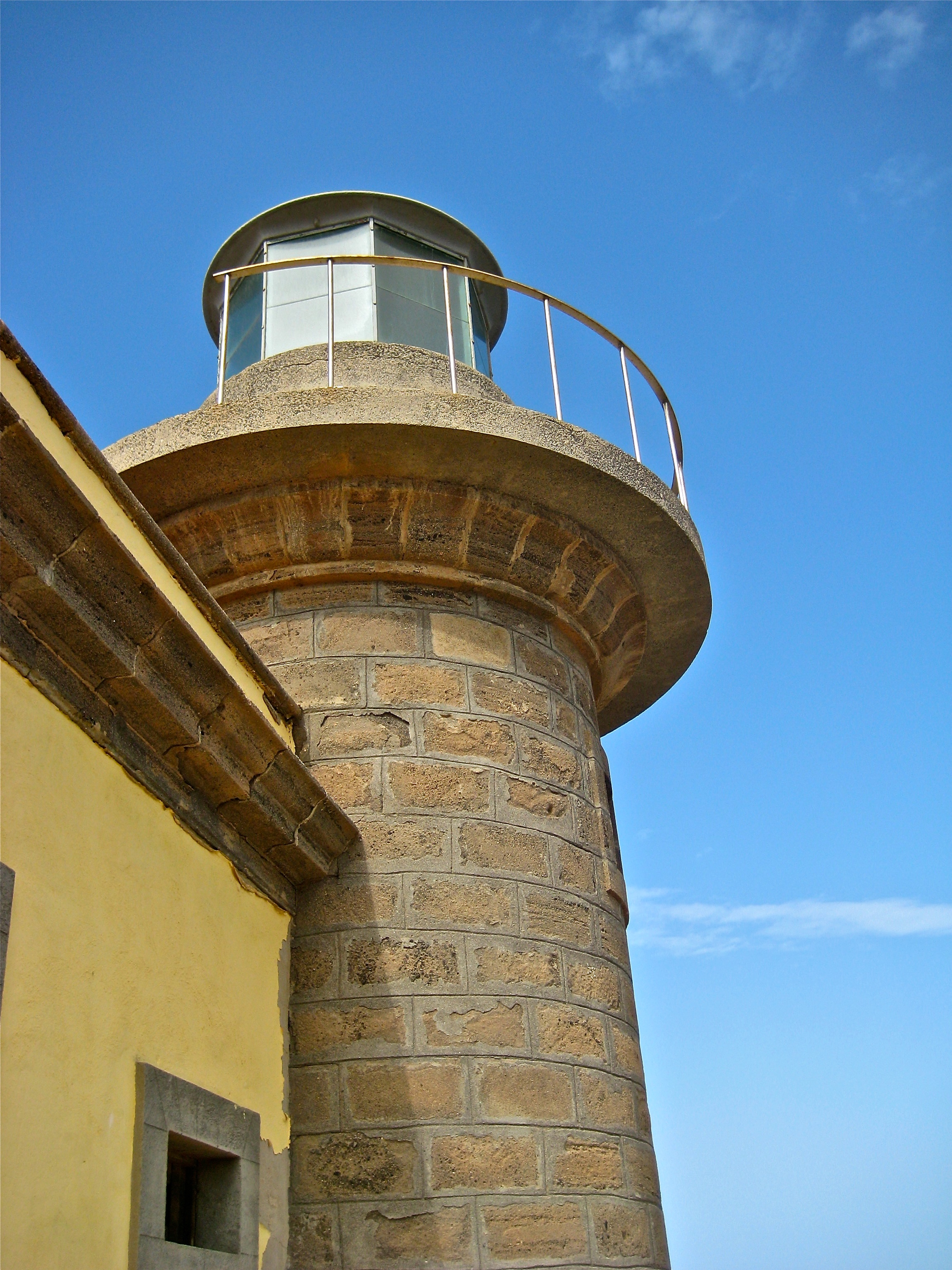
- Punta Martiño lighthouse
- Location: Lobos Island; Fuerteventura; Canary Islands; Spain
- Coordinates: 28.764957°N 13.814879°W

Tower
- Constructed: 1865
- Construction: stone tower
- Height: 6 metres (20 ft)
- Shape: cylindrical tower with balcony and lantern
- Markings: unpainted tower, grey lantern
- Power source: solar power
- Operator: Parque Natural Islote de Lobos

Light
- Focal height: 29 metres (95 ft)
- Range: 14 nautical miles (26 km; 16 mi)
- Characteristic: Fl (2) W 15s.
- Spain no.: ES-12140

The Punta Martiño Lighthouse (Spanish: Faro de Punta Martiño) is an active lighthouse on the Canary island of Lobos, near Fuerteventura in the municipality of La Oliva.

The lighthouse is situated on a hill at the north-eastern end of the island, and along with the other lights at Pechiguera and Tostón, marks the La Bocayna strait that separates Lanzarote from Fuerteventura.

== History ==
The lighthouse was opened in 1865, making it one of the oldest in the Canaries. Built in a similar style to other Canarian 19th-century lights, it consists of a painted single storey house, with dark volcanic rock used for the masonry detailing. A six-metre-high (20-foot) masonry tower is attached to the seaward side of the house.

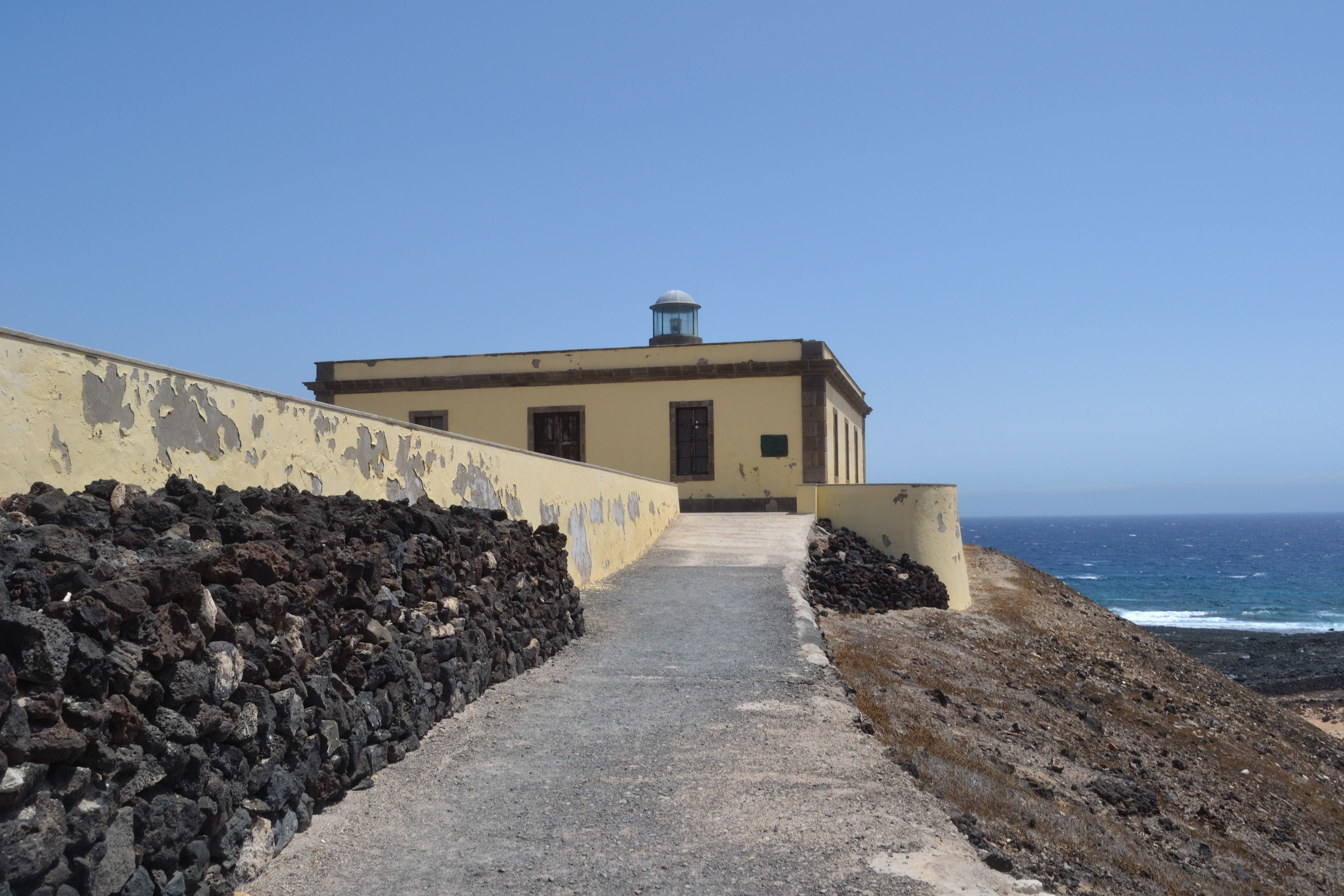
View from pathway to the lighthouse

The sixth order light was originally powered by olive oil, and gave a steady red light that had a range of 9 miles. In 1883, the oil-powered lamp was replaced by one that ran on paraffin, and then in 1923 this was superseded by an acetylene lamp, that provided a longer range, and flashed twice every five seconds. An automatic sun valve was also added, to save the keeper having to light and extinguish the lamp, each day at dusk and dawn. A system of solar panels and batteries now provide the power for a 150-watt electric halogen lamp, which has a reach of 14 nautical miles. When the lighthouse was automated in the 1960s the keeper and his family were the last to leave the island, which now has no permanent residents.

The area around the lighthouse can be reached by following the marked 3.5 km footpath from the ferry landing; although the site is accessible, the tower and buildings are closed.

Map showing the principal lighthouses of Fuerteventura

== See also ==
- List of lighthouses in Spain
- List of lighthouses in the Canary Islands
