= Maspalomas Lighthouse =

Lighthouse on Gran Canaria, Spain

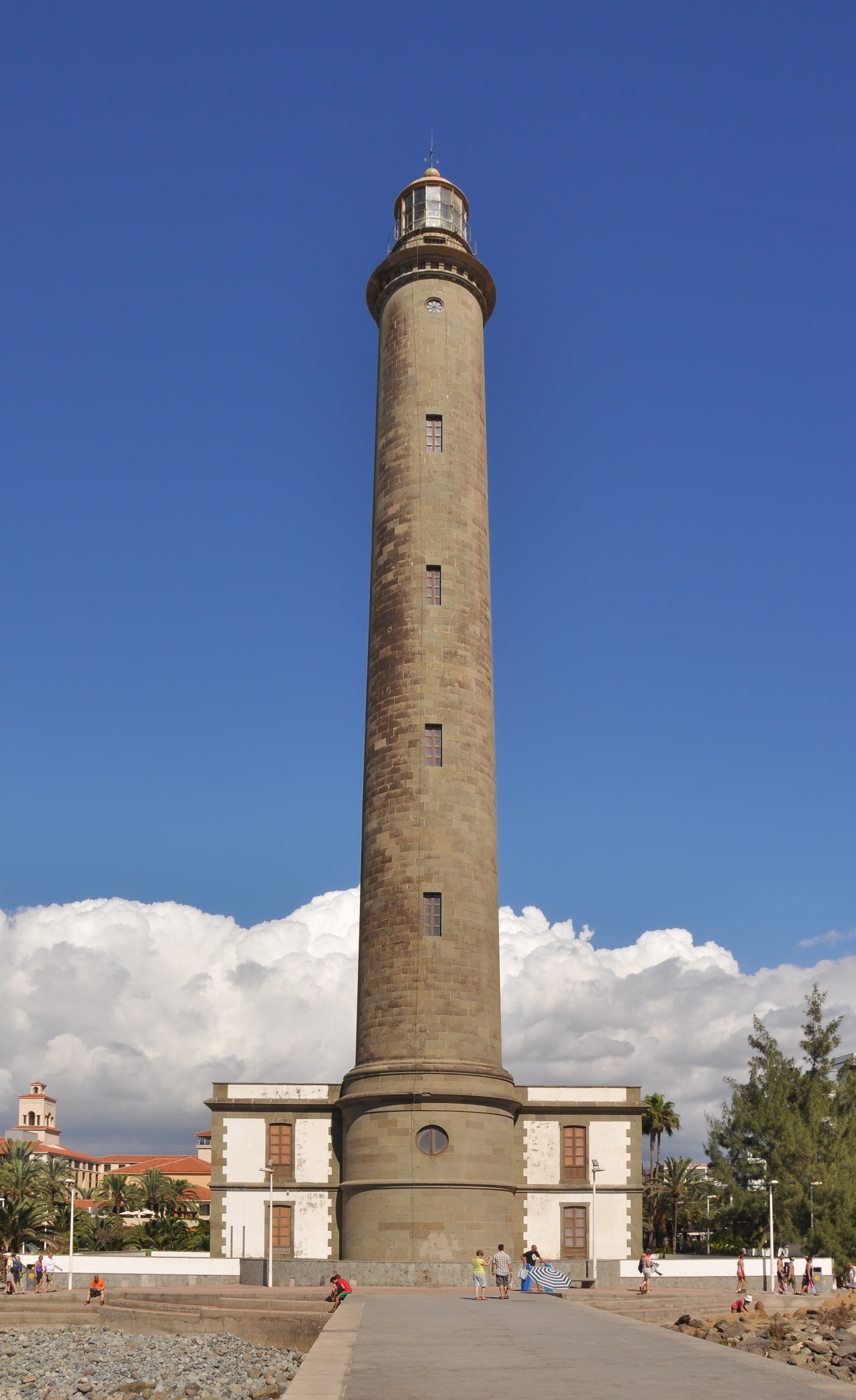
- Location: Maspalomas; Gran Canaria; Canary Islands
- Coordinates: 27.735121°N 15.598934°W

Tower
- Constructed: 1890
- Construction: stone tower
- Automated: 1976
- Height: 56 metres (184 ft)
- Shape: cylindrical
- Markings: Grey, white
- Operator: Autoridad Portuaria de Las Palmas de Gran Canaria
- Heritage: bien de interés cultural

Light
- Focal height: 60 metres (200 ft)
- Intensity: 1,000 candela
- Range: 19 nautical miles (35 km; 22 mi)
- Characteristic: Fl (1+2) W 13s.
- Spain no.: ES-12520

The Maspalomas Lighthouse (Spanish: Faro de Maspalomas) is an active 19th century lighthouse at the southern end of the Spanish island of Gran Canaria, in the Canary archipelago. It lies at one end of the Maspalomas beach, 4 kilometres (2.5 mi) south of the resort town centre, next to the area known as the Maspalomas Dunes.

The lighthouse is a distinctive landmark in the resort, and is the tallest masonry lighthouse in the Canaries at 56 m (184 ft) being superseded only by the more modern 59 m (194 ft) concrete Morro Jable lighthouse on Fuerteventura.

With a focal height of 60 m (197 ft) above the sea, its light can be seen for 19 nautical miles, and consists of a pattern of three flashes of white light, over a period of thirteen seconds.

== Construction and equipment ==
This lighthouse is a construction conceived by the engineer Juan León y Castillo as a luminous complex made up of two main bodies, the house of the bullfighter and the tower. The house, with a rectangular floor plan, was developed from a traditional idea such as the Canarian patio, but the four facades of the building are aided by the eclectic fashion of the period in which it was built. The dwelling, attached to the base of the tower, acts as a plinth that counteracts the thrusts of the tower.

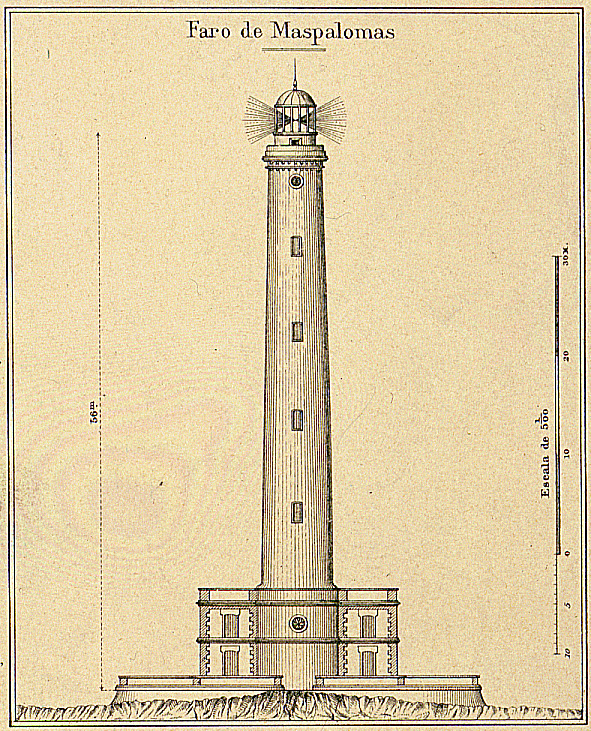
Maspalomas Lighthouse Line Art 1895 Gran Canaria

The decision to build a lighthouse in Maspalomas dates from 19 June 1861, but it was not until 1884 that Juan de León y Castillo was commissioned to draw up the project. The works lasted until 1889 and the lighthouse emitted its first flash of light on the night of its commissioning, 1 February 1890.

The tower, presented to the sea, in the southern part of the set, is a truncated cone cylinder that has an average diameter in the upper body of 6.20 meters, a height of 54.70 meters and at its summit is located the lantern, so that the set reaches a height of 60 meters. It has a classic shaft design whose section decreases as it approaches its capital, finished off with rings and modules. Its facade has a succession of elongated vertical openings, which give light to the staircase leading up to the lantern and, at the top, under the capital, a small glazed lamp whose purpose is rather ornamental. The colour of the tower is blue-grey, typical of the masonry with which it is built in its entirety.

The lantern is a glass dome of 3.7 meters in diameter, covered at the top. Inside it are the optics, the reflectors and the 1000-watt halogen lamp, which emits a white light at the rate of a group of a slow flash with a 1+2 frequency of 13 seconds between groups. The flashes have a nominal night-time range of 19 nautical miles.

The lighthouse is located in Punta de Maspalomas, at the end of Maspalomas beach, next to the dune field, pool and oasis of the same name; tourist area in the greatest degree in the south of the island of Gran Canaria. It is the most popular lighthouse in the Canary Islands, considered an emblematic symbol and one of the best known monuments in Gran Canaria and the municipality of San Bartolomé de Tirajana. In addition to being recognized as an Asset of General Interest, it is one of the oldest lighthouses still in operation in the Canary Islands.

It is fully automated and operates using conventional electrical power connected to the public grid. It has annexed rooms at the foot of the tower, in a two-storey building of eclectic style. This building is attached to the tower on its north side and is a rectangular construction, symmetrical in the arrangement of its doors and windows, whose perimeters are outlined in stone. Its corners and a cornice that finishes off the entire upper part also make use of ashlars to harmonise the whole. Above the entrance to the building there is a small balcony made of tea wood and inside there is a patio that serves as a distributor to give access to all the rooms and to the tower itself. In them are the different rooms, warehouses and the room that the lighthouse keeper had; as well as a generator and the corresponding batteries to guarantee the operation in case of disconnection or failure in the electrical network.

== The lighthouse as a Landmark and future uses ==
The Maspalomas Lighthouse was declared a Property of Cultural Interest in the category of Historical Monument by the Canary Islands Government in 2005. Its protected area is 5225.72 square meters along a perimeter of 318.15 linear meters.

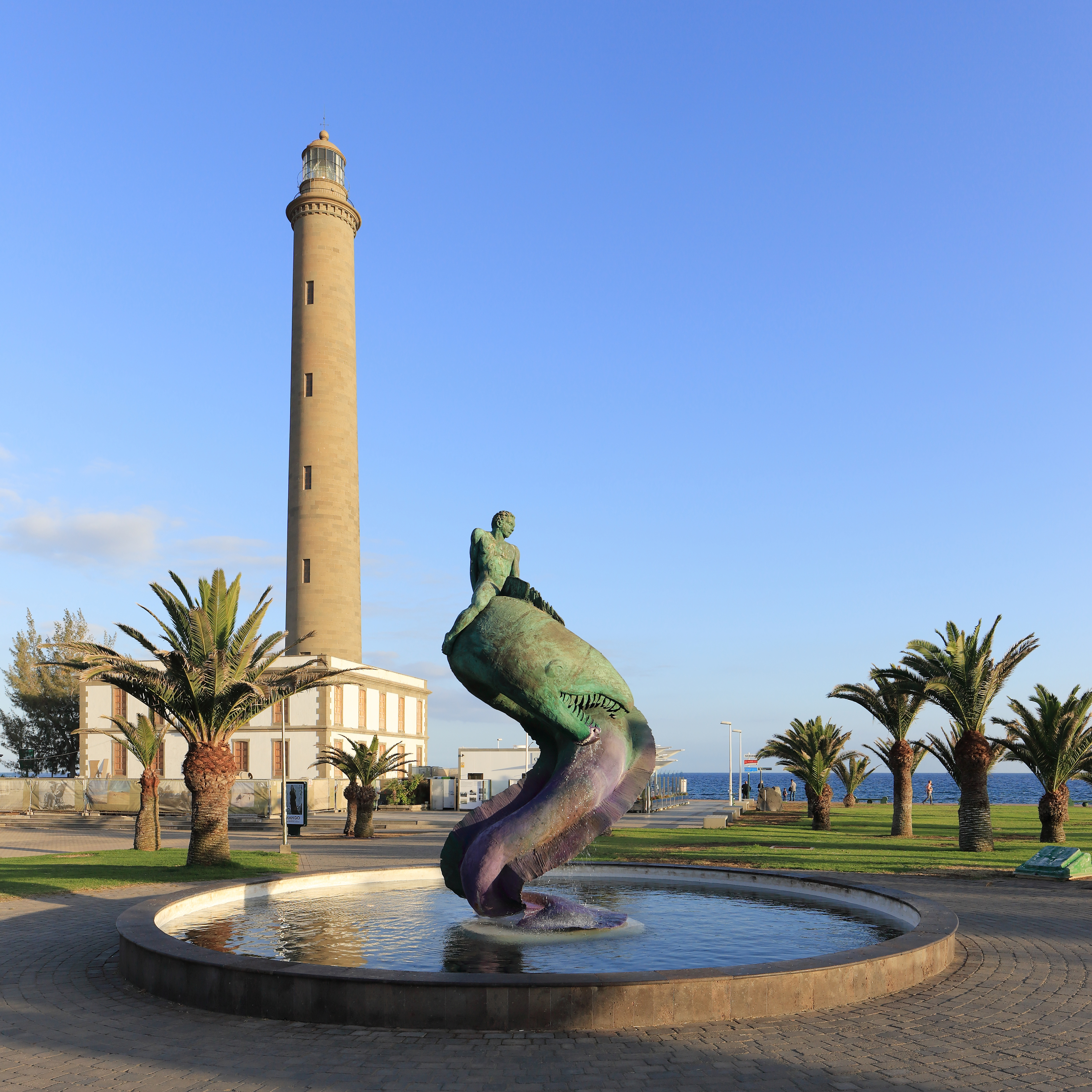
Faro de Maspalomas, May 2018 -2

On the occasion of Christmas 2005, the lighthouse was decorated, for the first time in its history, with Christmas lights. The micro-bulbs were placed by the Town Hall of San Bartolomé de Tirajana along the entire length of the tower, managing to enhance its height and showiness both in the distance and from the tourist enclave of Meloneras.

In February 2019, the Maspalomas Lighthouse reopened to the public after ten years of closure. While waiting for the museographic project for the Ethnographic Interpretation Centre to be awarded and executed, the Maspalomas Lighthouse can be visited with an exhibition of craftsmanship in the context of the rural houses of Gran Canaria together with objects of daily use until the middle of the 20th century. It also has contemporary products from the textile sector inspired by traditional craft techniques. It also has a doll's house from 1930 with seventeen rooms.

Map showing the principal lighthouses of Gran Canaria

== See also ==
- List of lighthouses in Spain
- List of lighthouses in the Canary Islands
- List of tallest lighthouses in the world
