= Lobos Island =

Spanish Island in the Atlantic

Coordinates: 28.748°N 13.822°W

Lobos
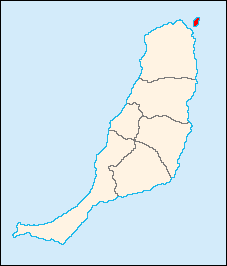
- Map of Fuerteventura showing Lobos

Geography
- Archipelago: Canary Islands
- Area: 4.68 km^{2} (1.81 sq mi)
- Highest elevation: 127 m (417 ft)

Administration
- Spain
- Autonomous Community: Canary Islands
- Province: Las Palmas
- Municipality: La Oliva

Demographics
- Population: 4 (2018)

Lobos (Spanish: Isla de Lobos, pronounced [ˈisla ðe ˈloβos]) is a small island of the Canary Islands (Spain) located just two kilometres (one nautical mile) north of the island of Fuerteventura. It belongs to the municipality of La Oliva on the island of Fuerteventura. It has an area of 4.68 square kilometres (1.8 sq mi). It has been a nature reserve (Parque Natural del Islote de Lobos) since 1982.

The island is accessible to tourists via a short ferry ride from Corralejo, in the north of Fuerteventura. It has day facilities and weekend homes of local fishermen. It offers hiking and snorkelling tours. At the northeastern end of the island is the Punta Martiño Lighthouse, the lighthouse keeper and his family were the last permanent inhabitants of Lobos, until the light was automated in the 1960s.

In 1405, Lobos Island served as resupply base for Jean de Béthencourt's conquest of the island of Fuerteventura.

== Origin of name ==
Lobos Island (Wolves Island) was named for the large number of sea wolves, also called monk seals, that once lived there. The monk seals were the island's only inhabitants when it was discovered by the Spanish conquerors of the Canaries archipelago in the fifteenth century, but with the arrival of the Spanish, these animals were hunted on a massive scale by sailors and fishermen who saw them as a source of food, fat and skin. As a result of this hunting, the species eventually became extinct on the island and its presence now is only occasional.

== History ==
Recent archaeological findings have concluded that Ancient Rome established a (possibly seasonal) settlement in the island, related with the obtention of purple dye.

In 1405 Lobos Island served as resupply base for Jean de Béthencourt´s conquest of Fuerteventura. Until 1968 the only inhabitants of the island were the lighthouse keeper and his family, who had the responsibility for operating the Faro de Lobos lighthouse located at Punta Martiño at the northern tip of the island, a prominent local landmark (his name was Antonito; a school in the town of Corralejo was named after him). The island was one of the first natural areas of the Canary Islands to be designated as a natural park in 1982. Later the island was also designated an area of special protection for birds, and many marine species of migratory birds inhabit the island.

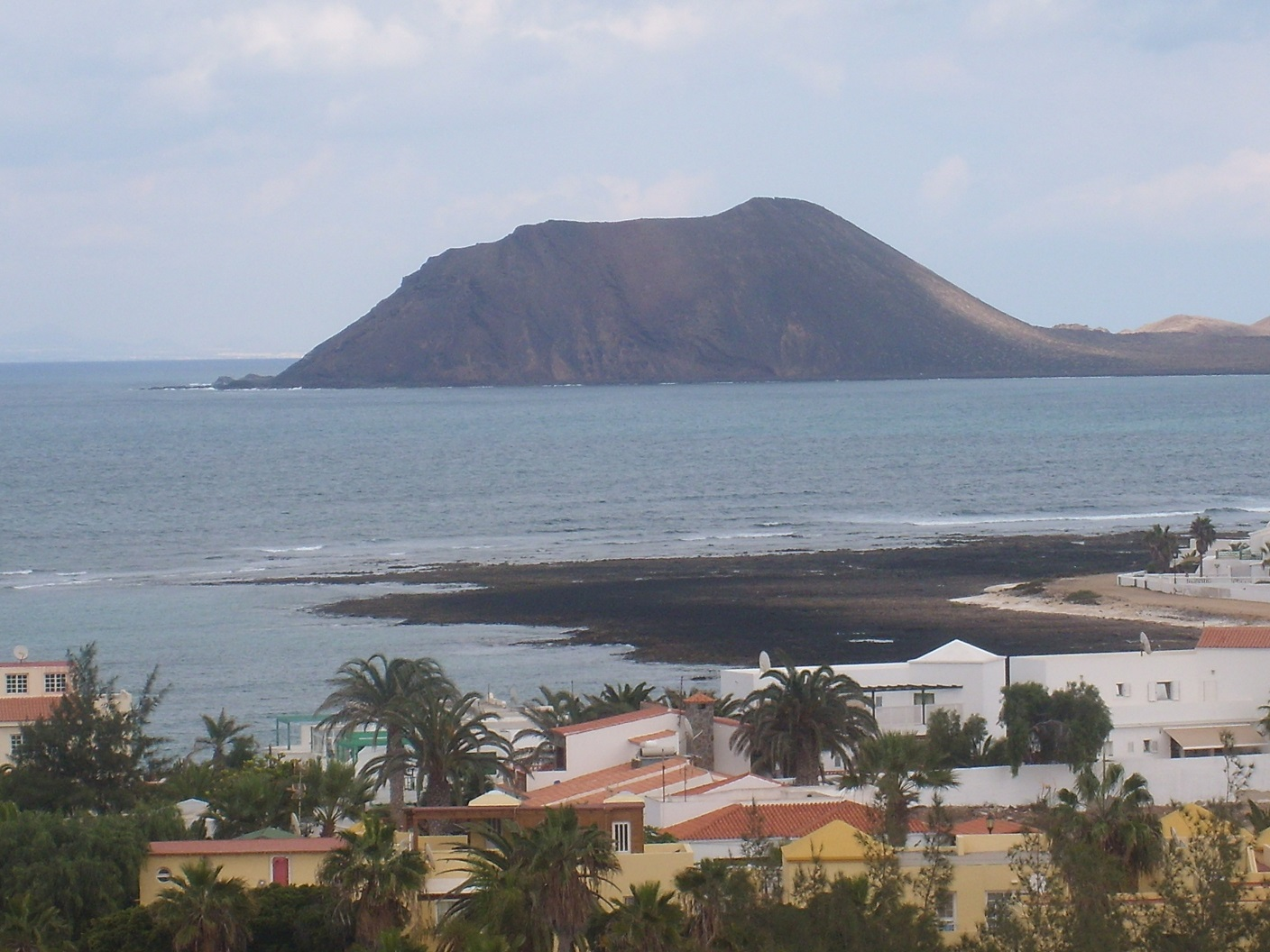
The island as seen from the town of Corralejo

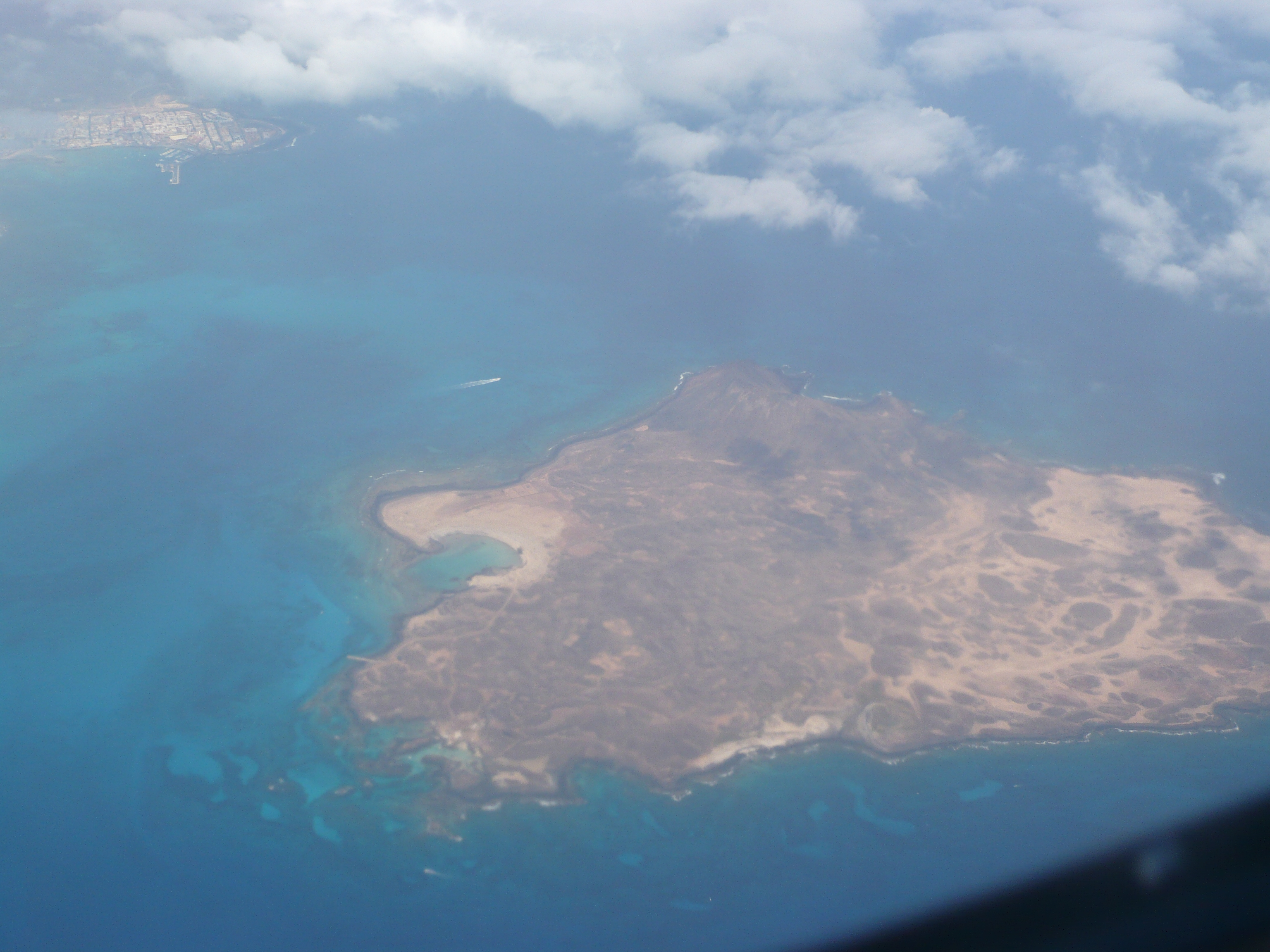
Aerial view of Lobos Island, with the harbour of Corralejo, Fuerteventura Island, in the top left corner

== Geography ==
Lobos Island, like the rest of the Canary Islands, is a volcanic island. Its age is estimated between 6,000 and 8,000 years. The highest point is on the island's volcanic caldera, Montaña La Caldera, 127 metres (417 feet) above sea level. The island includes a small lake, but the low rainfall creates an arid landscape.

== Fauna and flora ==
Despite being a desert and a volcanic landscape, Lobos Island has a large number of natural habitats. Because of its great ecological diversity the site has been designated as a protected zone, the Parque Natural del Islote de Lobos. There are over 130 plant species, including the siempreviva (Limonium ovalifolium), which is endemic to the island, and the sea uvilla (Zygophyllum fontanesii) which is very attractive because of its shape and color.

Likewise, birds are an important feature of the island: it has a great variety of seabirds that usually nest on cliffs and rocks. Breeding seabirds include Cory's and little shearwaters, European and band-rumped storm petrels, and Kentish plovers are resident. The island has been declared a special protection area (SPA) for birds, as well as being recognised as an Important Bird Area (IBA) by BirdLife International.

In addition to birds a great diversity of fish can be spotted in its waters. Of these, abound barracuda, hammerhead shark and bream.

== Tourism ==
The island is a popular location for day trips for tourists visiting from Fuerteventura who have an interest in flora, fauna and geology. Regular boat services ferry passengers from Corralejo harbour during daylight hours. To protect the natural landscape from human impact, access is limited to restricted areas and to a series of walking trails, marked by directional signs to protect the conservation areas. The paths take visitors from the boat jetty through a varied landscape, including to the lighthouse at Punto Martino and to the top of the caldera. There is a small, sheltered sea lagoon, Playa de la Concha, with a sandy beach for bathing.

Before 2007, visitors could ask for authorisation from the Fuerteventura local government's environment office to camp on the island, for a maximum of three nights, in one permitted location known as "El carpintero". Since 2007 it is prohibited to camp on the island.

== Gallery ==
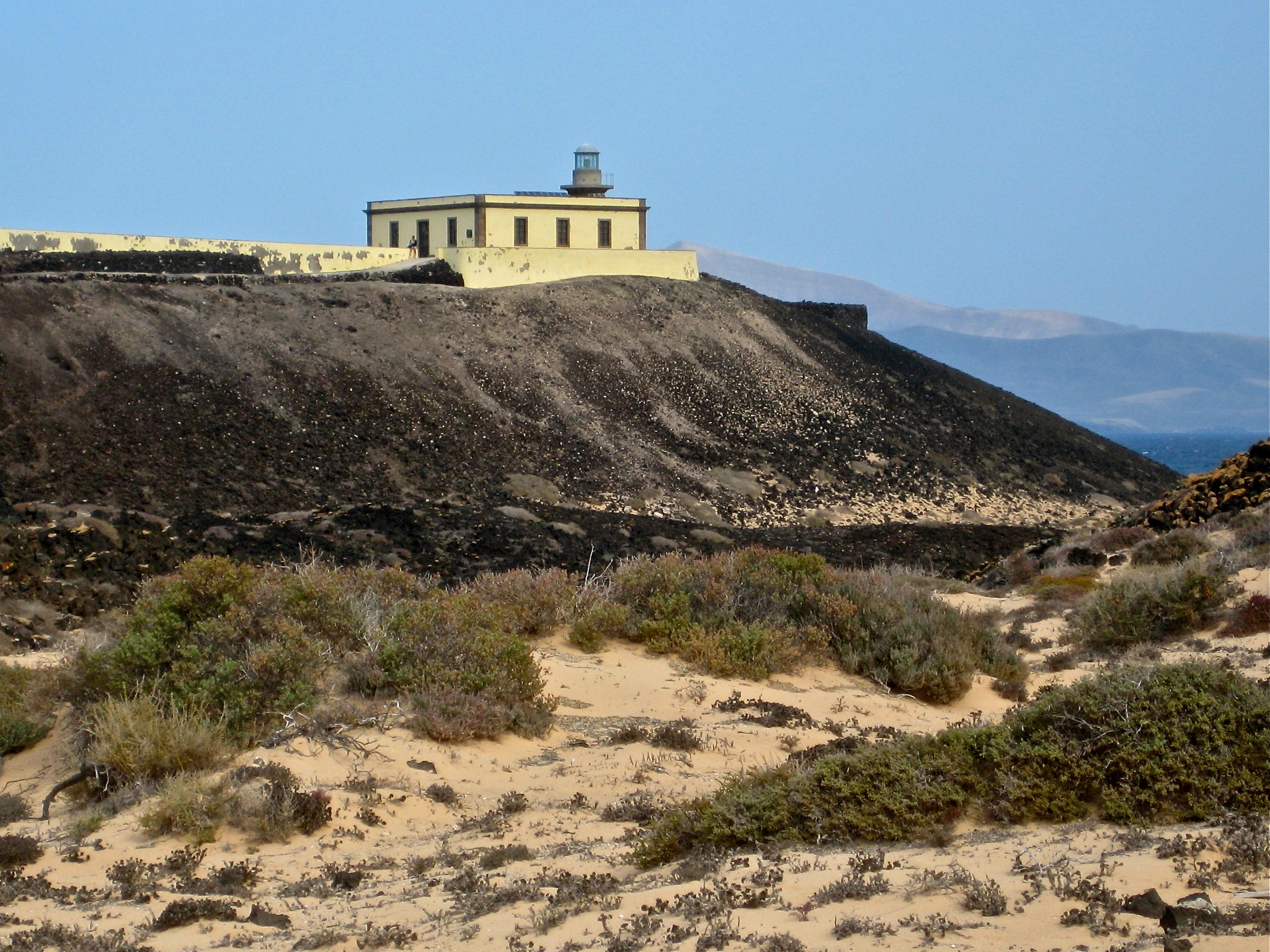
Punta Martiño Lighthouse

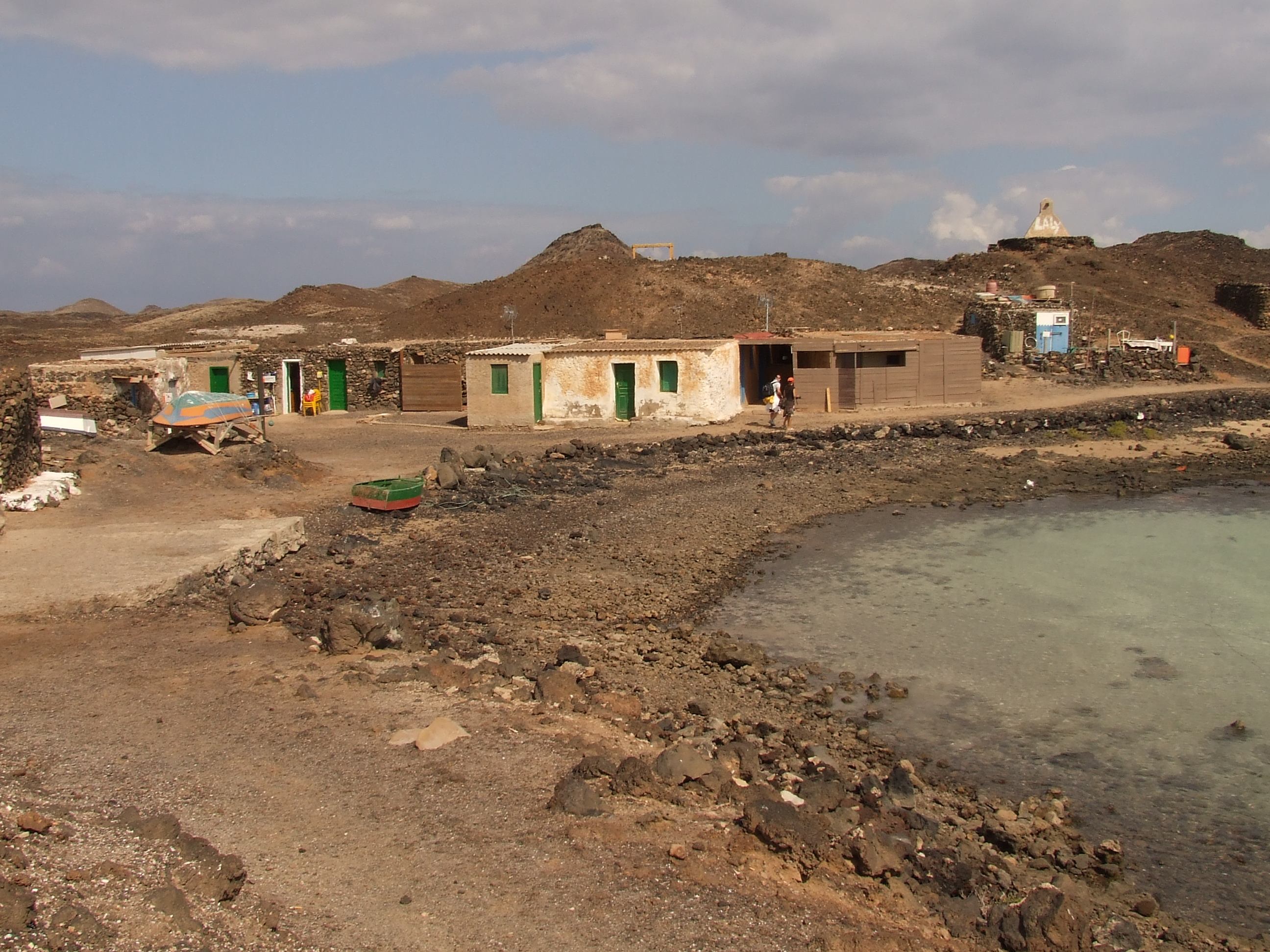
Lobos Island buildings

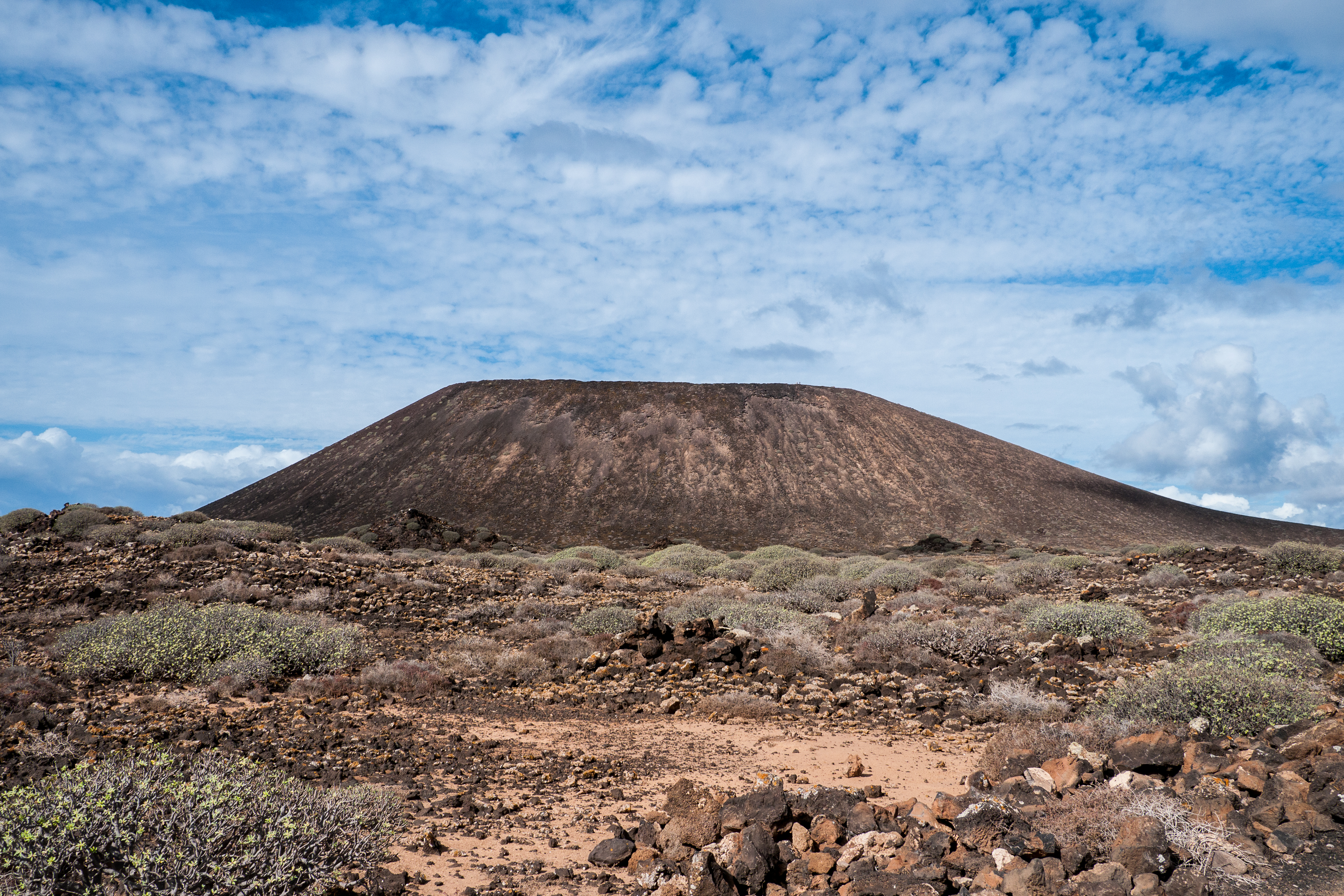
Montaña La Caldera

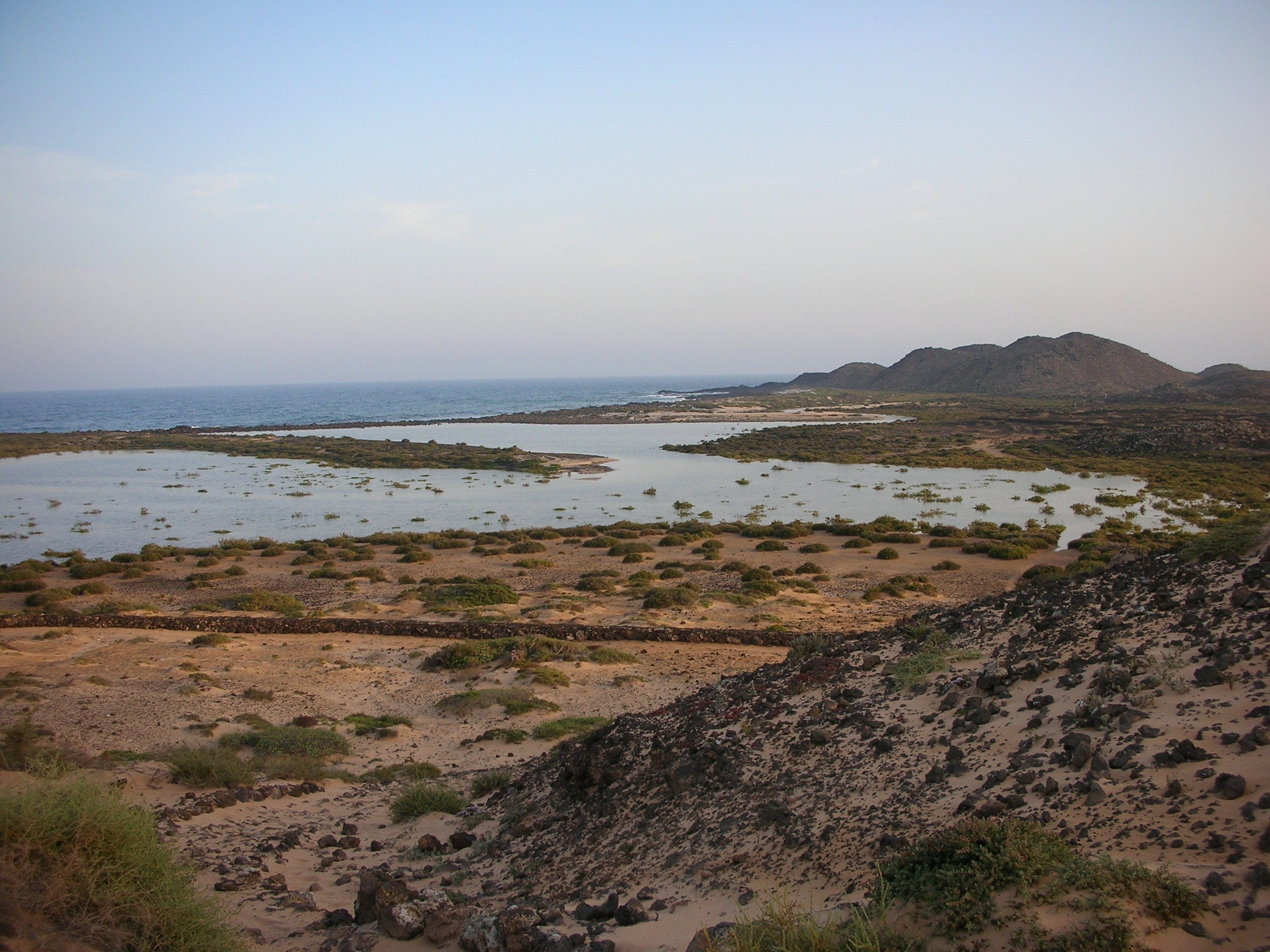
Lobos Island's small lagoon, Playa de la Concha

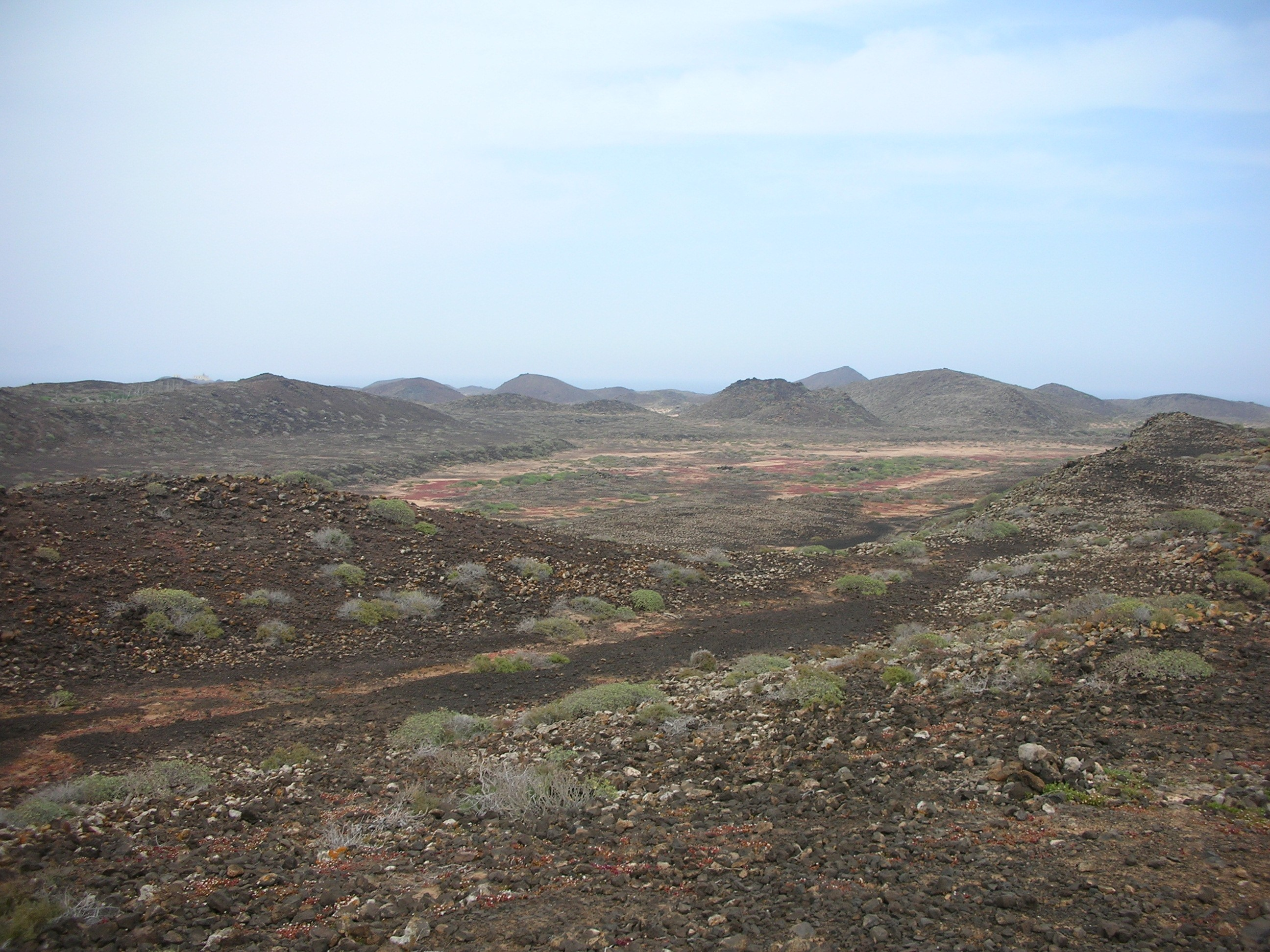
Lobos Island interior

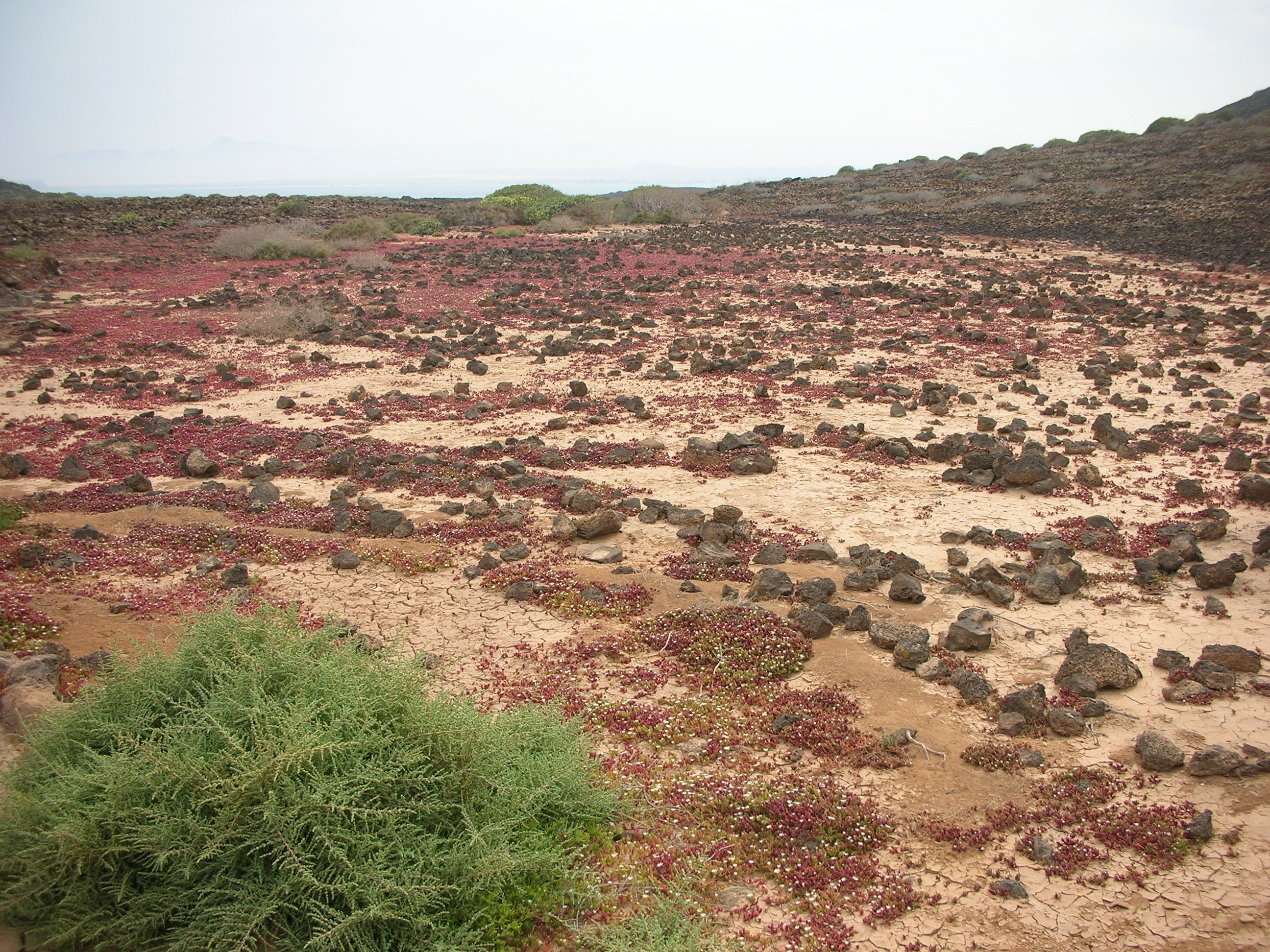
Lobos Island interior detail

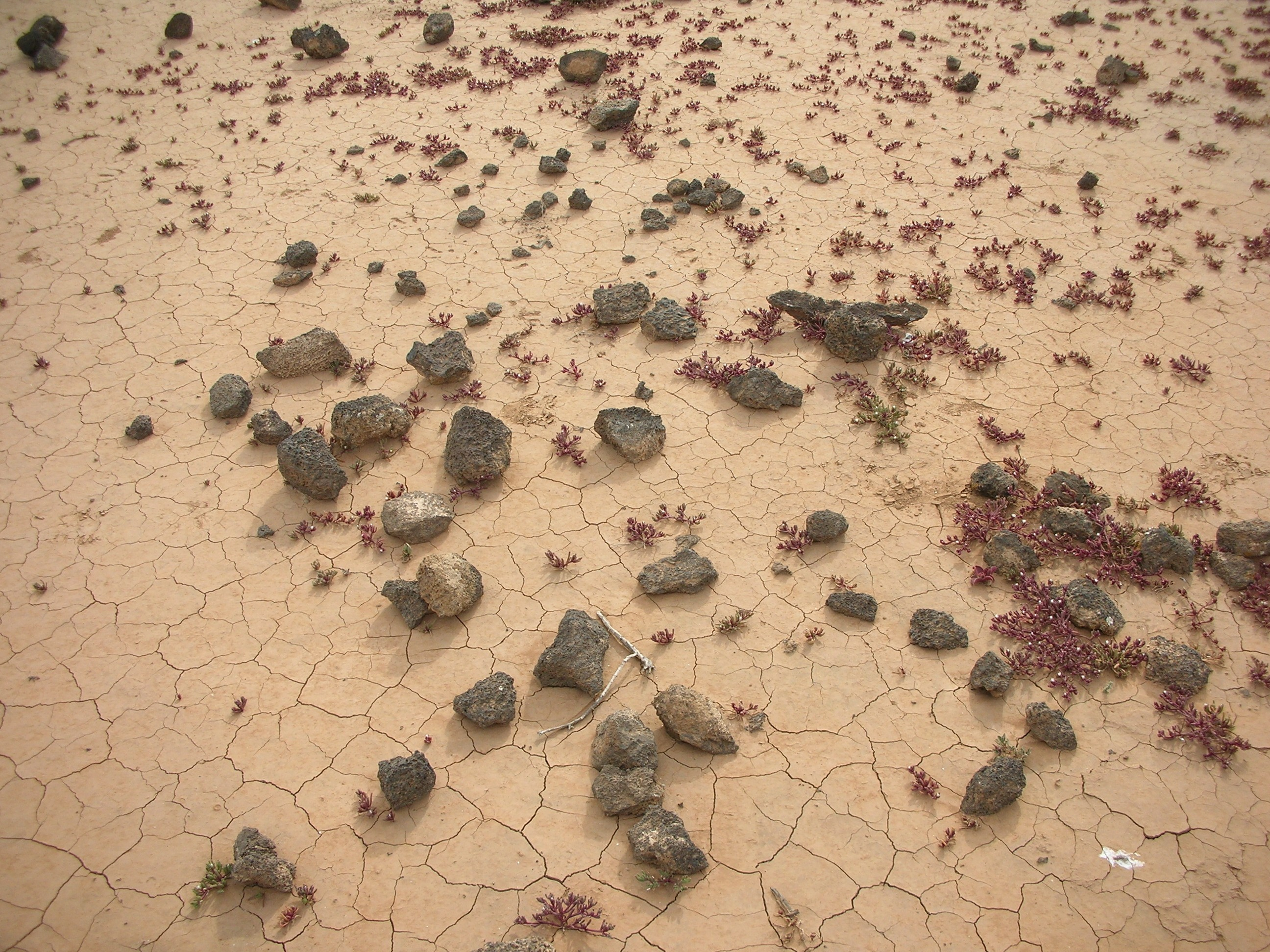
Lobos Island typical soil

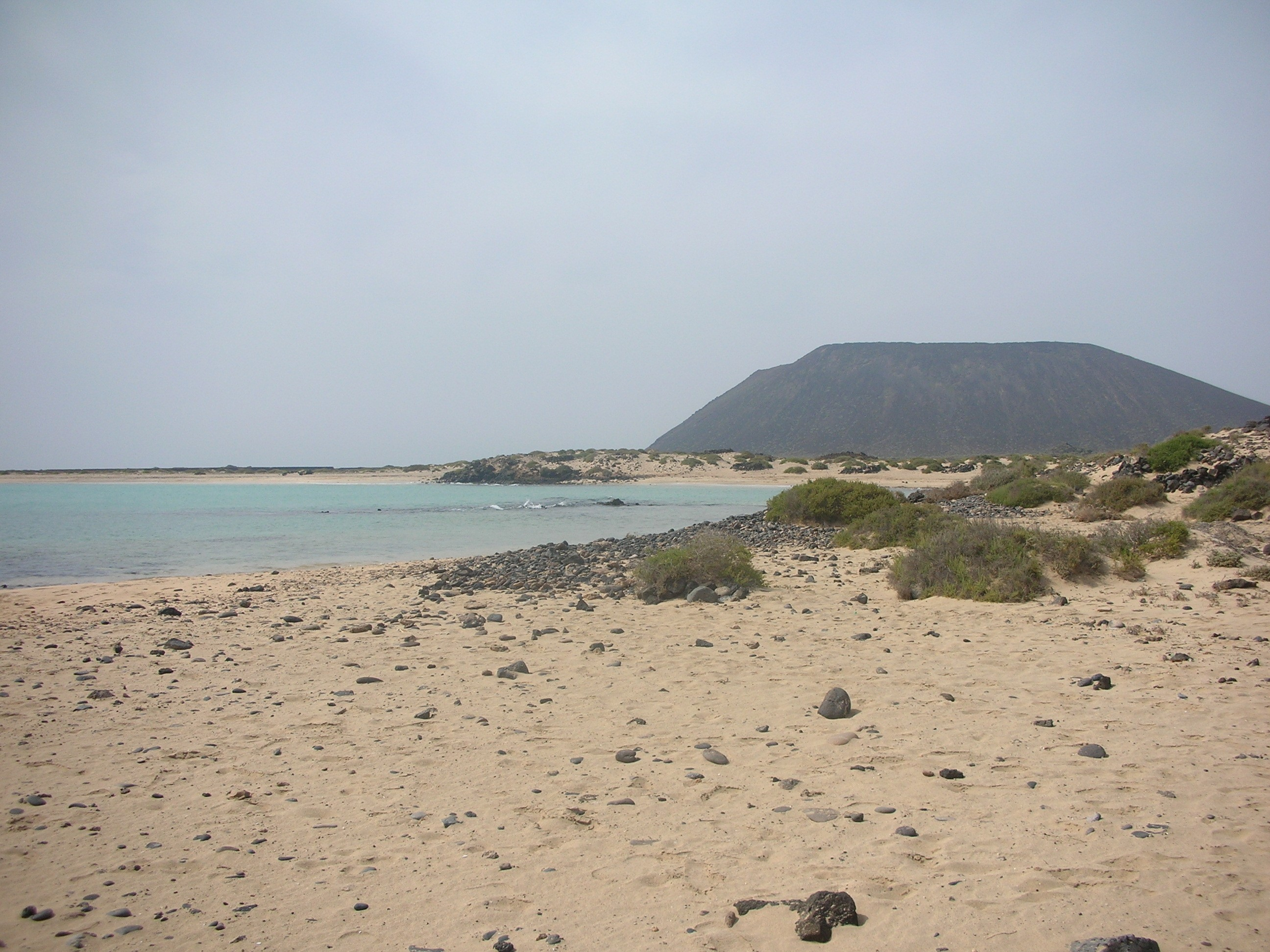
Lobos Island's Playa de la Concha, looking to Punta Saladero

== See also ==
- Geology of the Canary Islands
