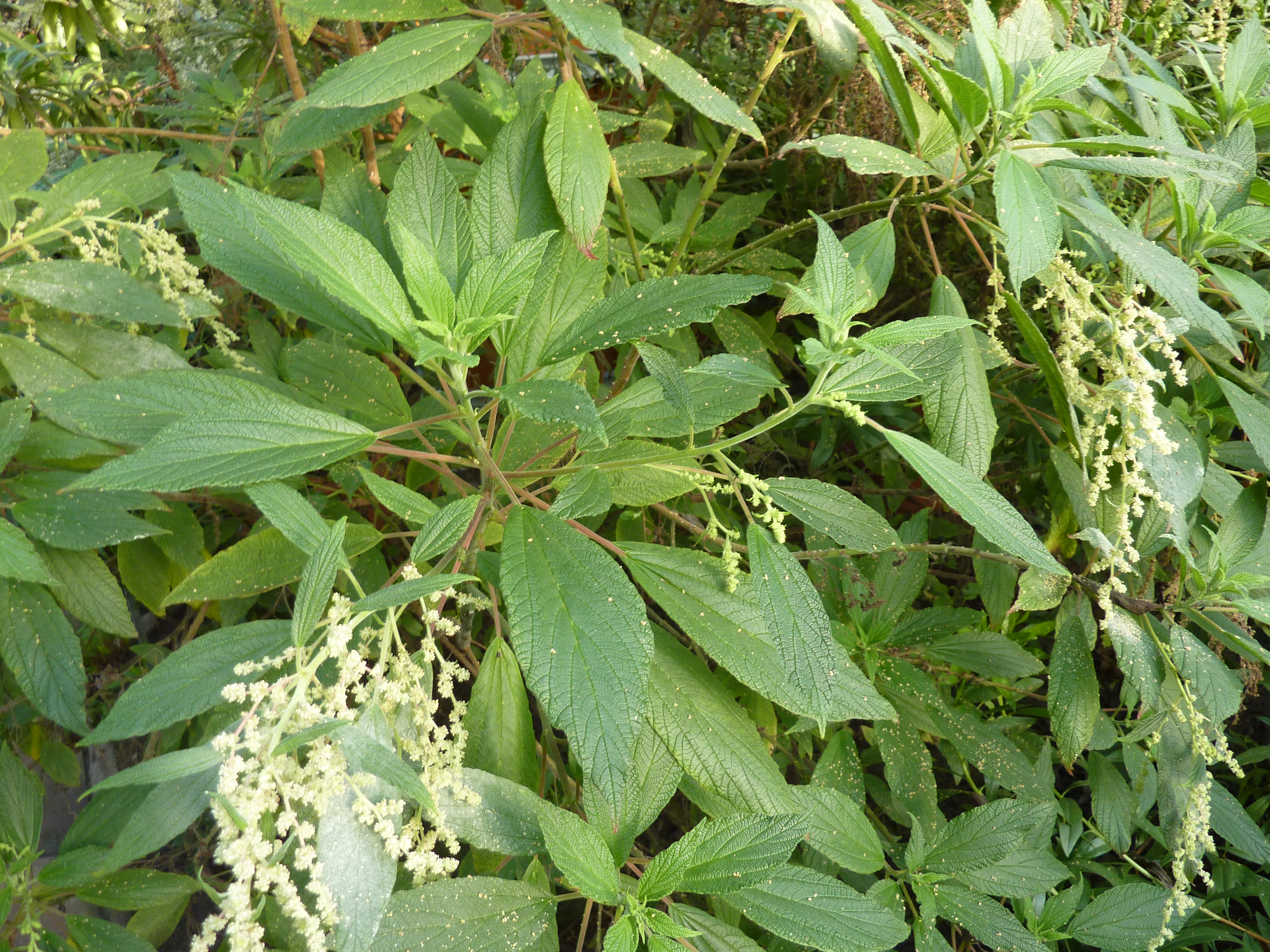

Scientific classification
- Kingdom: Plantae
- Clade: Tracheophytes
- Clade: Angiosperms
- Clade: Eudicots
- Clade: Rosids
- Order: Rosales
- Family: Urticaceae
- Genus: Gesnouinia
- Species: G. arborea

Binomial name
- Gesnouinia arborea (L.f.) Gaudich.

= Gesnouinia arborea =

Species of flowering plant

Gesnouinia arborea, (ortigon de los montes), is a shrub or small tree.

== Description ==
Leaves entire, acuminate, 3-nerved, pubescent, stipules absent. Flowers monoecious, 1 female and 2 male in each involucre. Involucres clustered into a dense panicle. Male flowers with 4-partite calyx and 4 stamens. Female flowers with included ovary and short styles. Seeds (achenes) enclosed by the calyx.

== Distribution ==
In Tenerife found in laurel forest zone of Sierra Anaga, Las Mercedes, Vueltas de Taganana, 600–800 m, Icod el Alto and Barranco del Agua near Los Silos, rare. In La Palma found in Laurel woods at Los Tiles, Cubo de la Galga, Cumbre Nueva and Barlovento. In La Gomera found in El Cedro forest, Roque de Agando and Chorros de Epina, 600–1000 m. In El Hierro found in Forests of El Golfo. In Gran Canaria found in Los Tiles de Moya, Barranco de la Virgen and Osorio, rare.

== Gallery ==
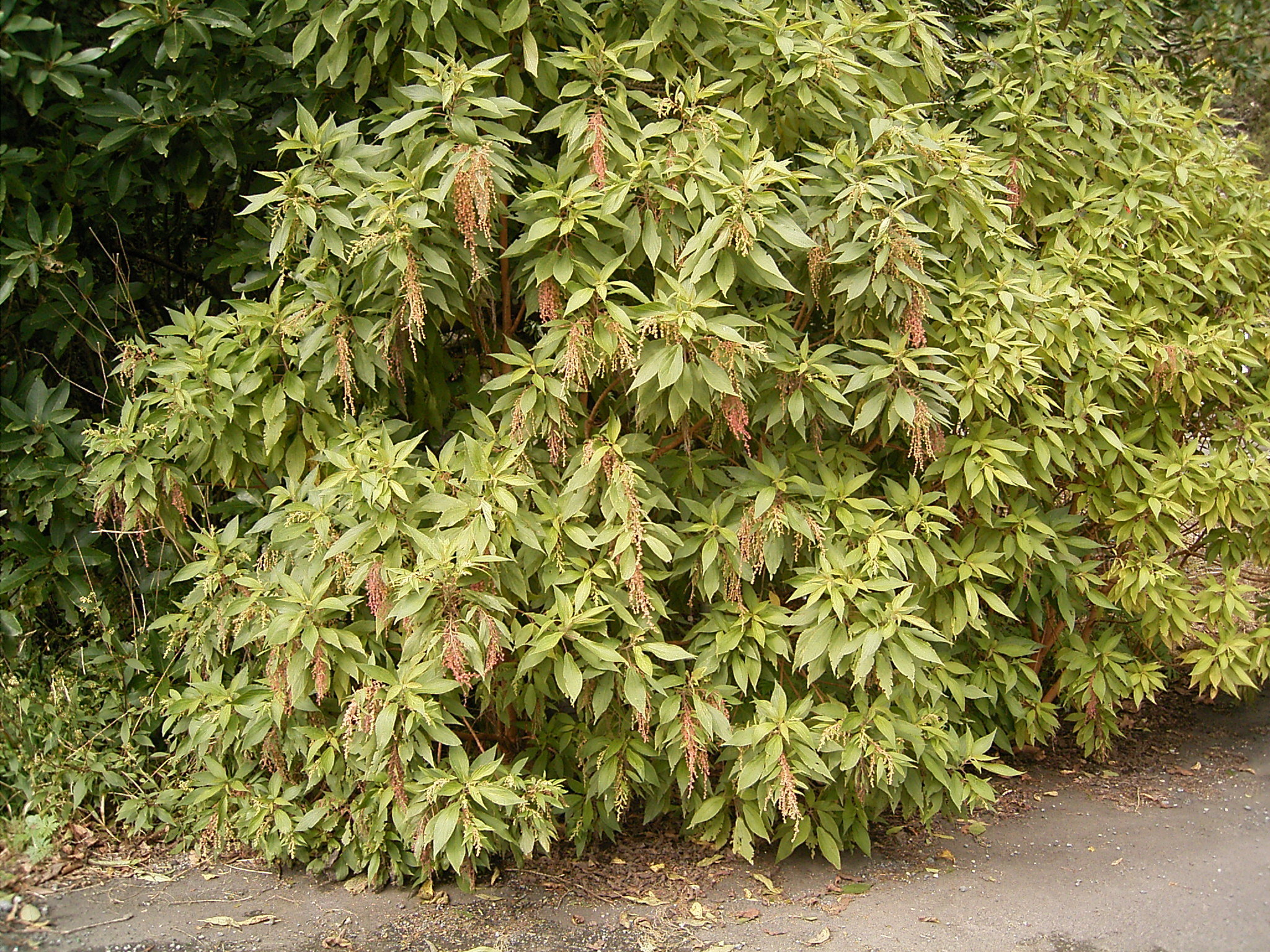
Habit

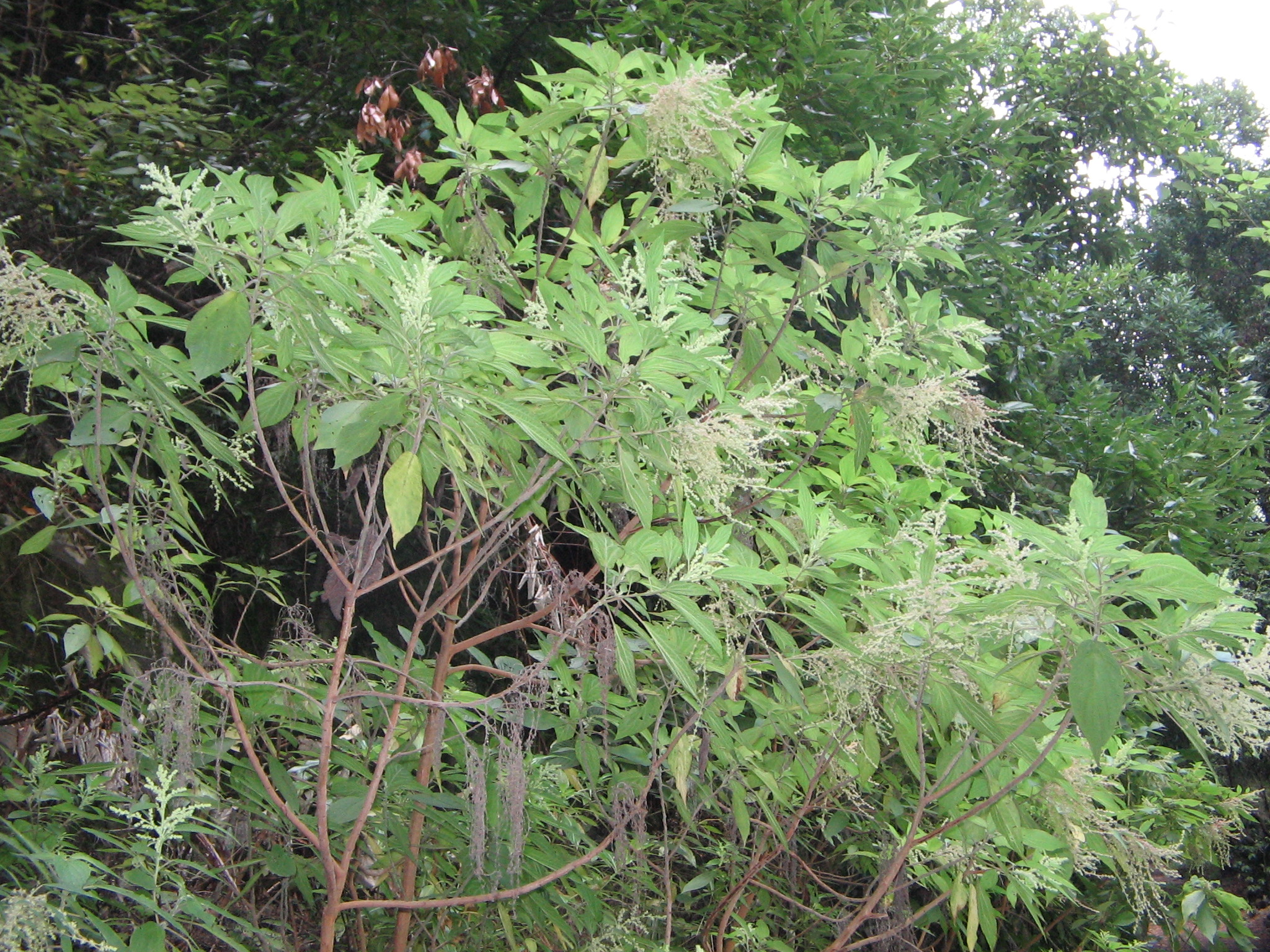
Crown

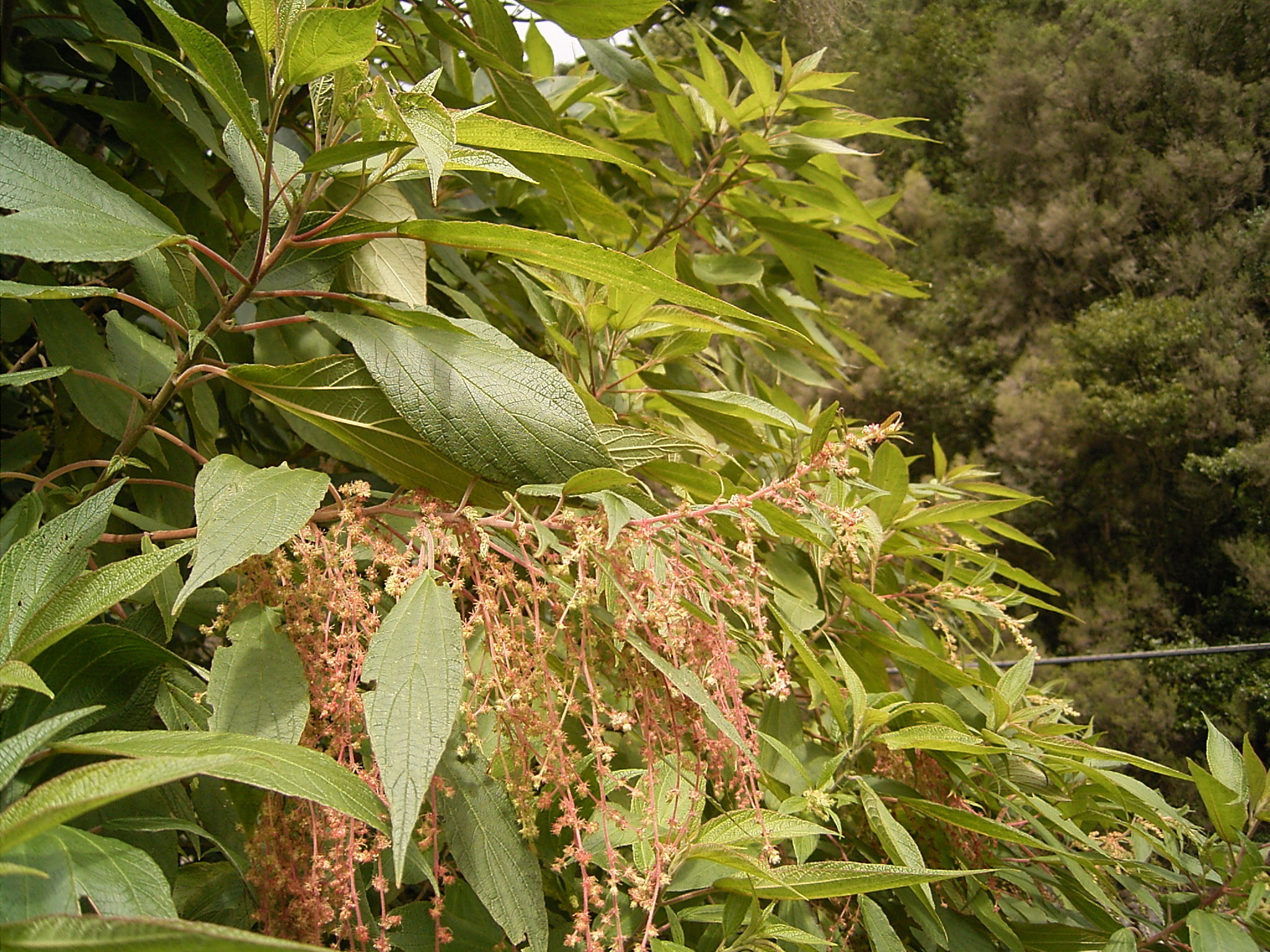
Inflorescences

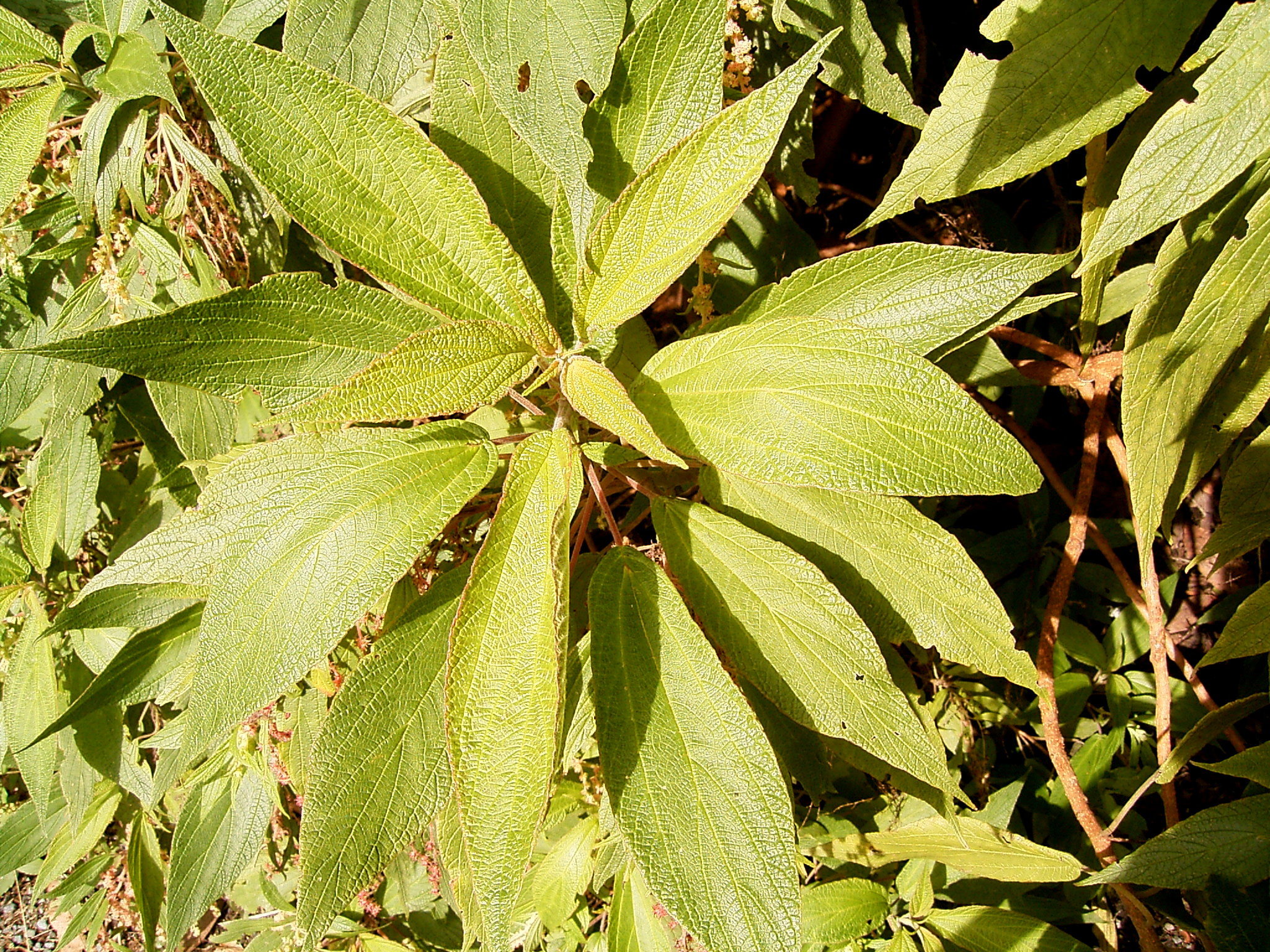
Leaves

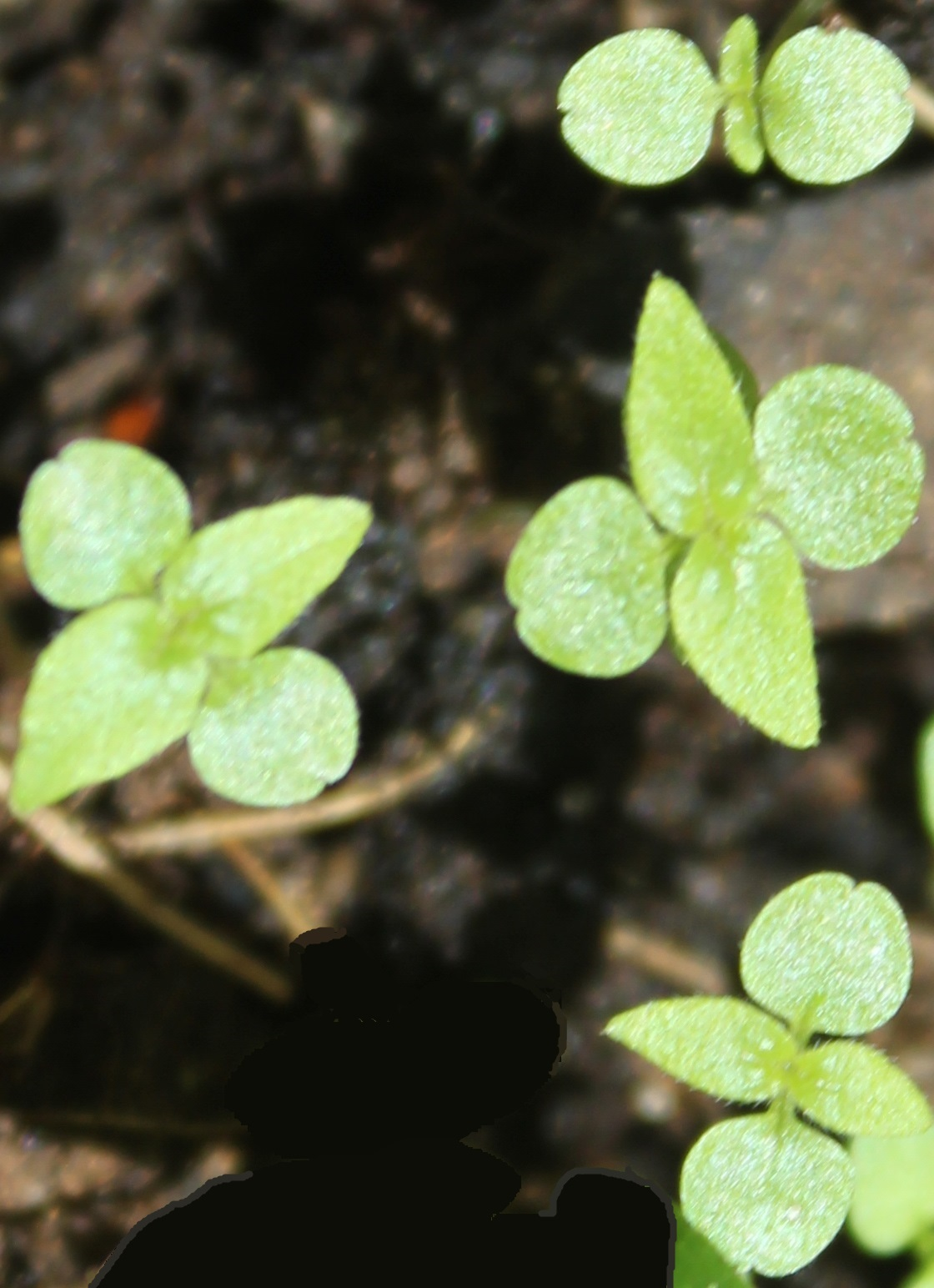
Seedlings at an early stage.

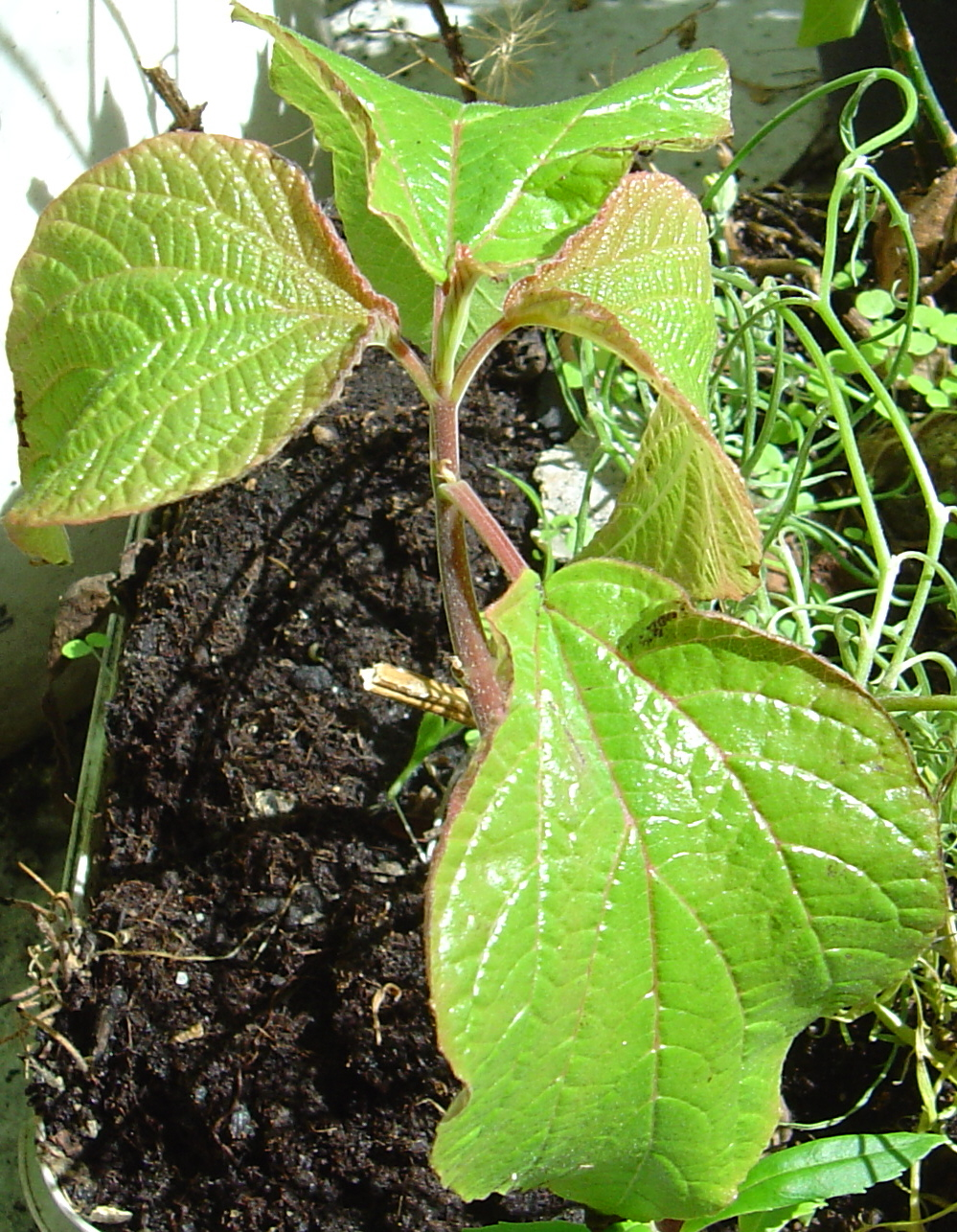
Seedling

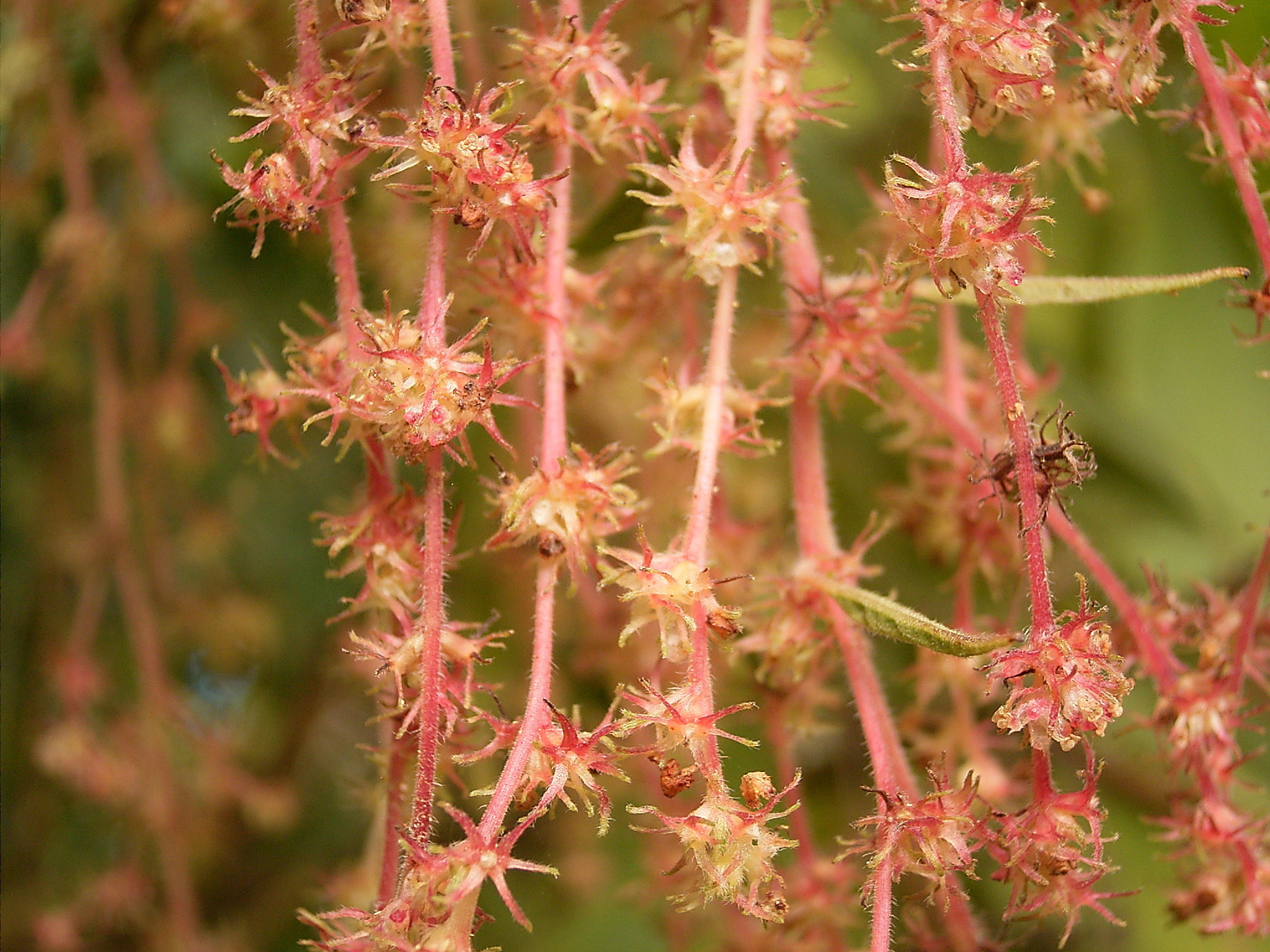
Fruits

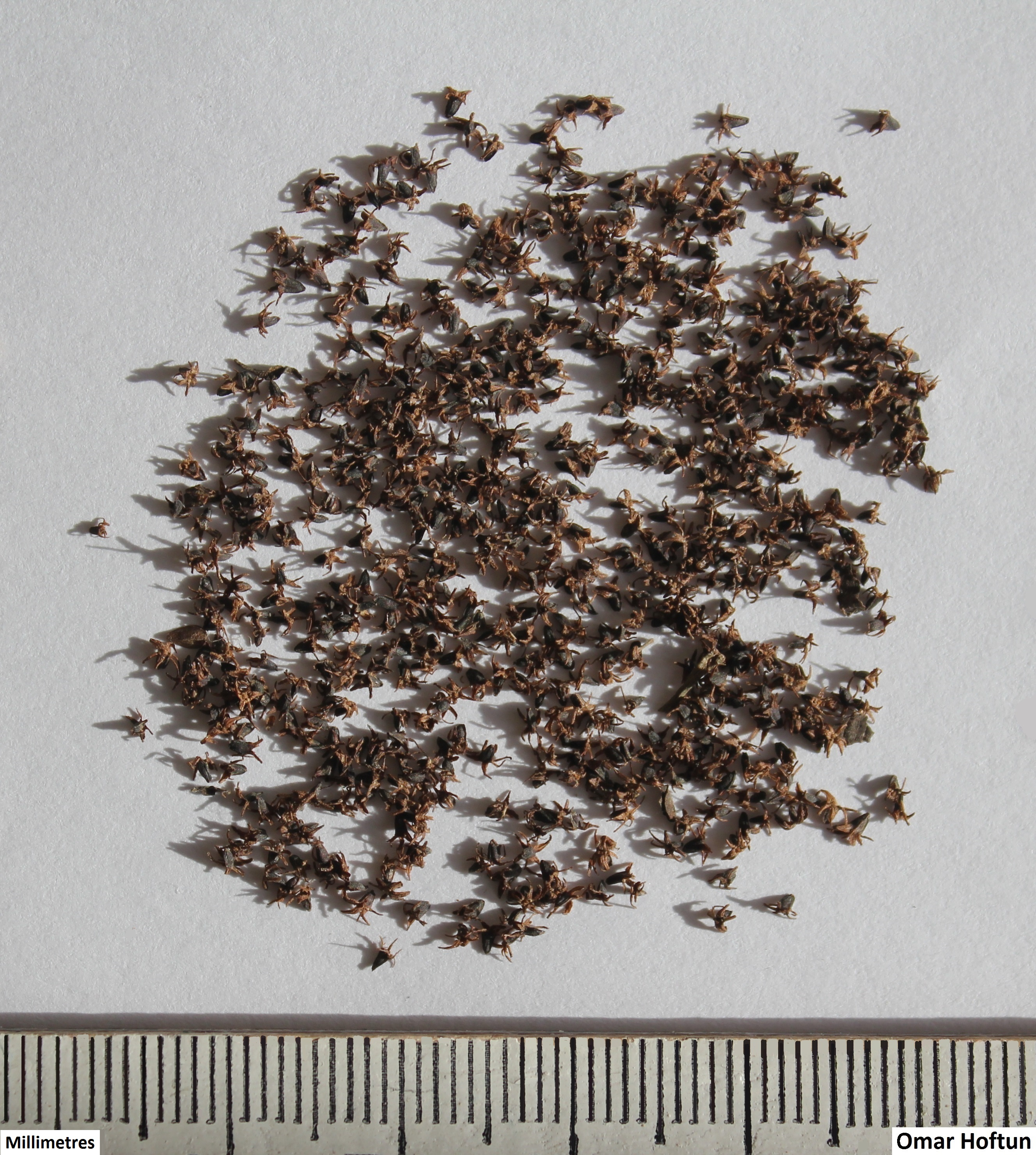
Achenes
