= Punta Lava Lighthouse =

Lighthouse on La Palma, Spain

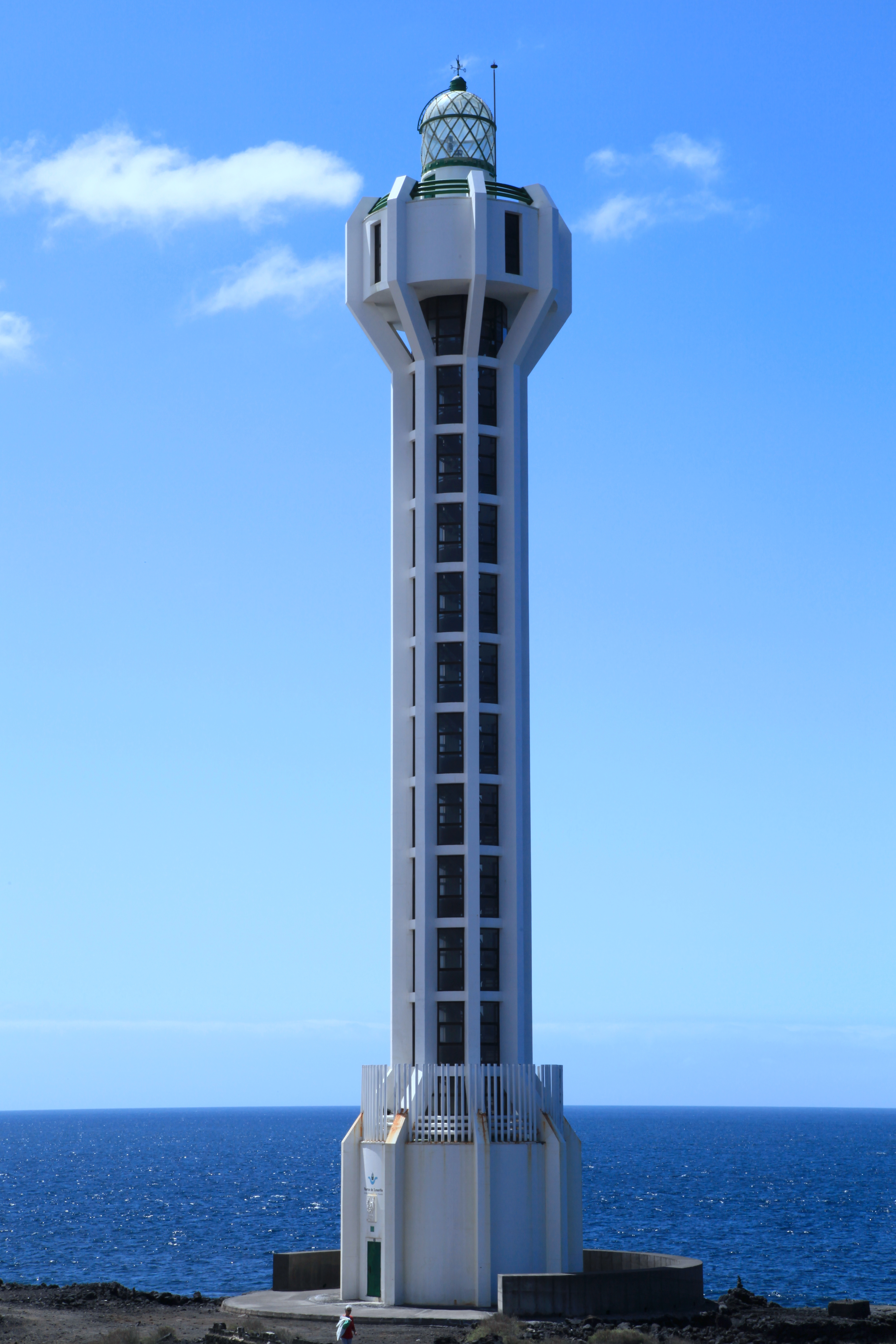
- Location: Tazacorte, La Palma
- Coordinates: 28.59667°N 17.92568°W

Tower
- Constructed: 1993
- Height: 48 metres (157 ft)

Light
- Focal height: 51 metres (167 ft)
- Range: 20 nautical miles (37 km; 23 mi)
- Characteristic: Fl(1+2) W 20s

Punta Lava Lighthouse (Spanish: Faro de Punta Lava) is an active 20th century Spanish lighthouse on the Canary island of La Palma. It is located in the municipality of Tazacorte, near the village of La Bombilla on the western side of the island. The larger settlement of Puerto Naos lies 2 kilometres to the south-west.

It is one of four main lighthouses on La Palma, each one marking a different cardinal point of the island. The modern lighthouses of Punta Lava and Arenas Blancas are located on the western and eastern sides of the island. The older lighthouses at Punta Cumplida and Fuencaliente are situated at the northern and southern points respectively.

== Punta Lava ==
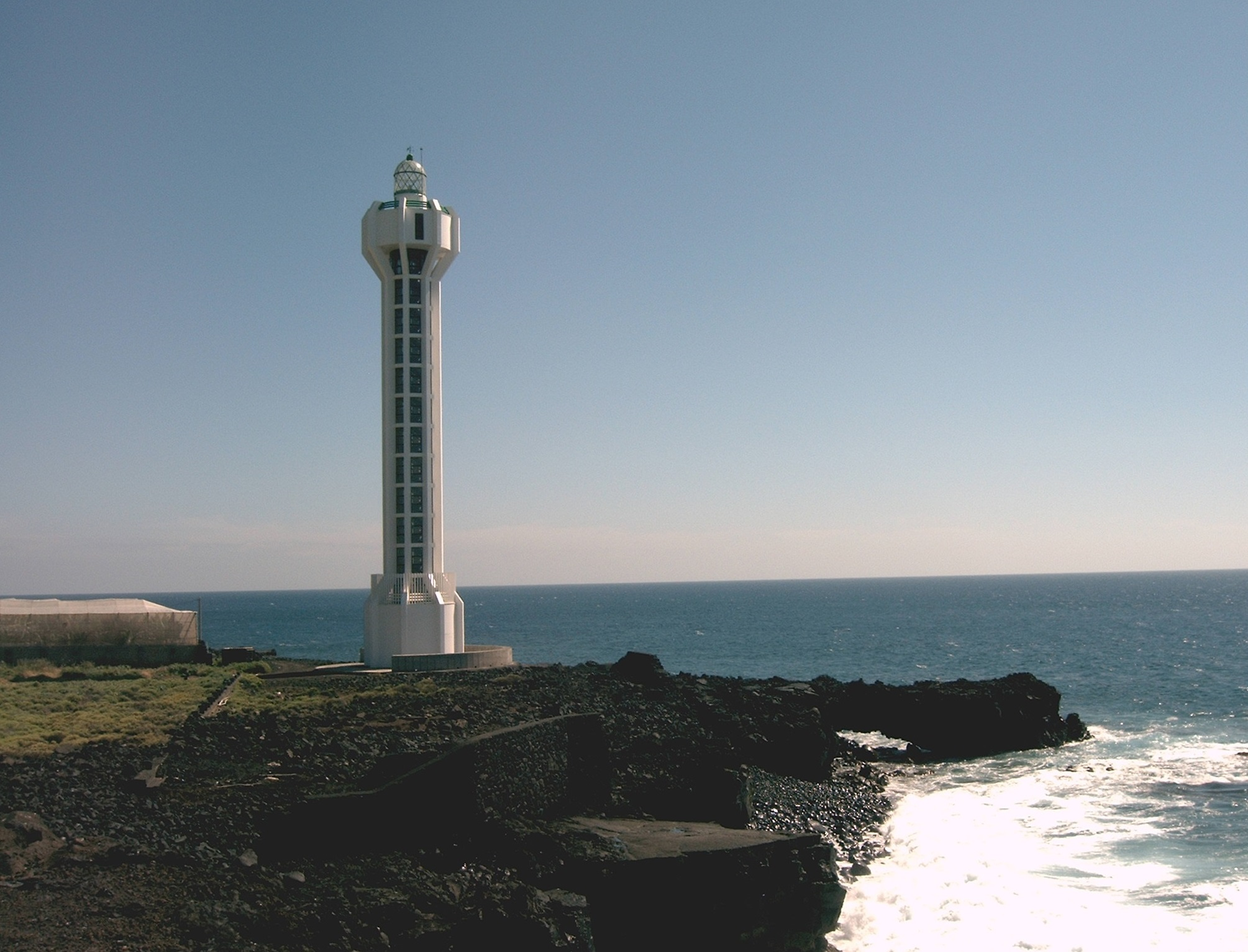
View of the lighthouse and coastal location

The headland of Punta Lava (Lava Point) on which the lighthouse was constructed was formed during the San Juan eruption in 1949. In June of that year, lava flowed from the Cumbre Vieja at 1300 m above sea level down to the Atlantic Ocean, and created a six by three and a half kilometre wide lava platform in the sea. As well as the lighthouse, the headland also contains the village of La Bombilla, a series of large banana plantations and a beach known as Playa Charcon.

The need for the lighthouse on the west coast of the island was identified in the third maritime lighting plan for the Canaries from the 1980s, although initially a light was planned for Punta del Moro some 9 km to the north, near Los Llanos de Aridane.

== Description ==
The white octagonal concrete tower, described as a "remarkable modern design", is 48-metre-high (157 ft) and was completed in 1993. It first entered service in 1996 and stands on a cliff next to the Atlantic Ocean, about three metres above sea level. This gives the light a focal height of 51 m which has a range of 20 nautical miles, and consists of a pattern of three flashes of white light every twenty seconds. In 1998 a new optic was installed, and later the lamps were replaced by sealed beam units.

The lighthouse is operated and maintained by the port authority of the province of Santa Cruz de Tenerife. It is registered under the international number D2851 and has the NGA identifier of 113-23801.

== Map ==
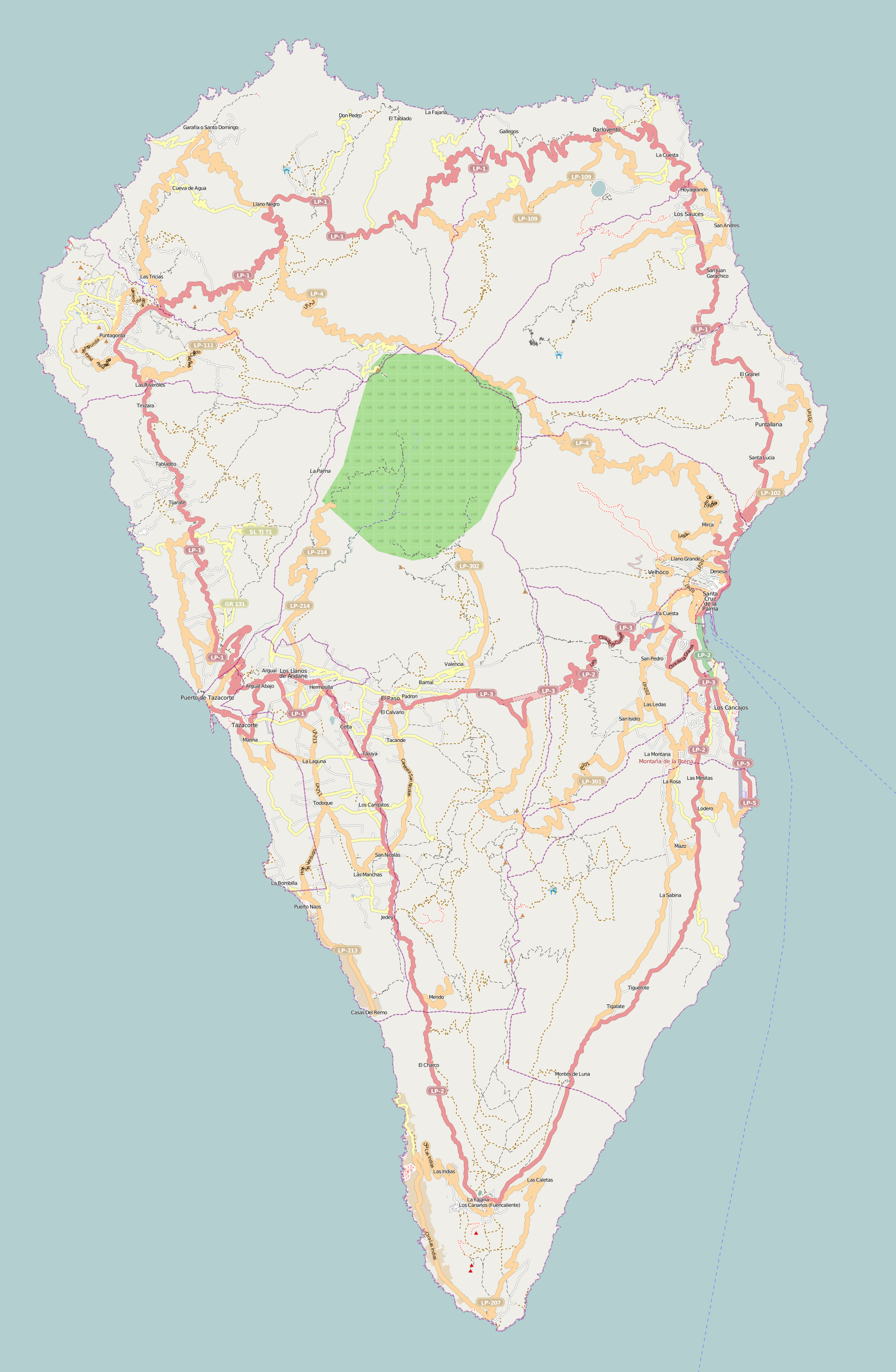
Map showing the principal lighthouses of La Palma

== See also ==
- List of lighthouses in the Canary Islands
- List of lighthouses in Spain
