= Punta Cumplida Lighthouse =

Lighthouse on La Palma, Spain

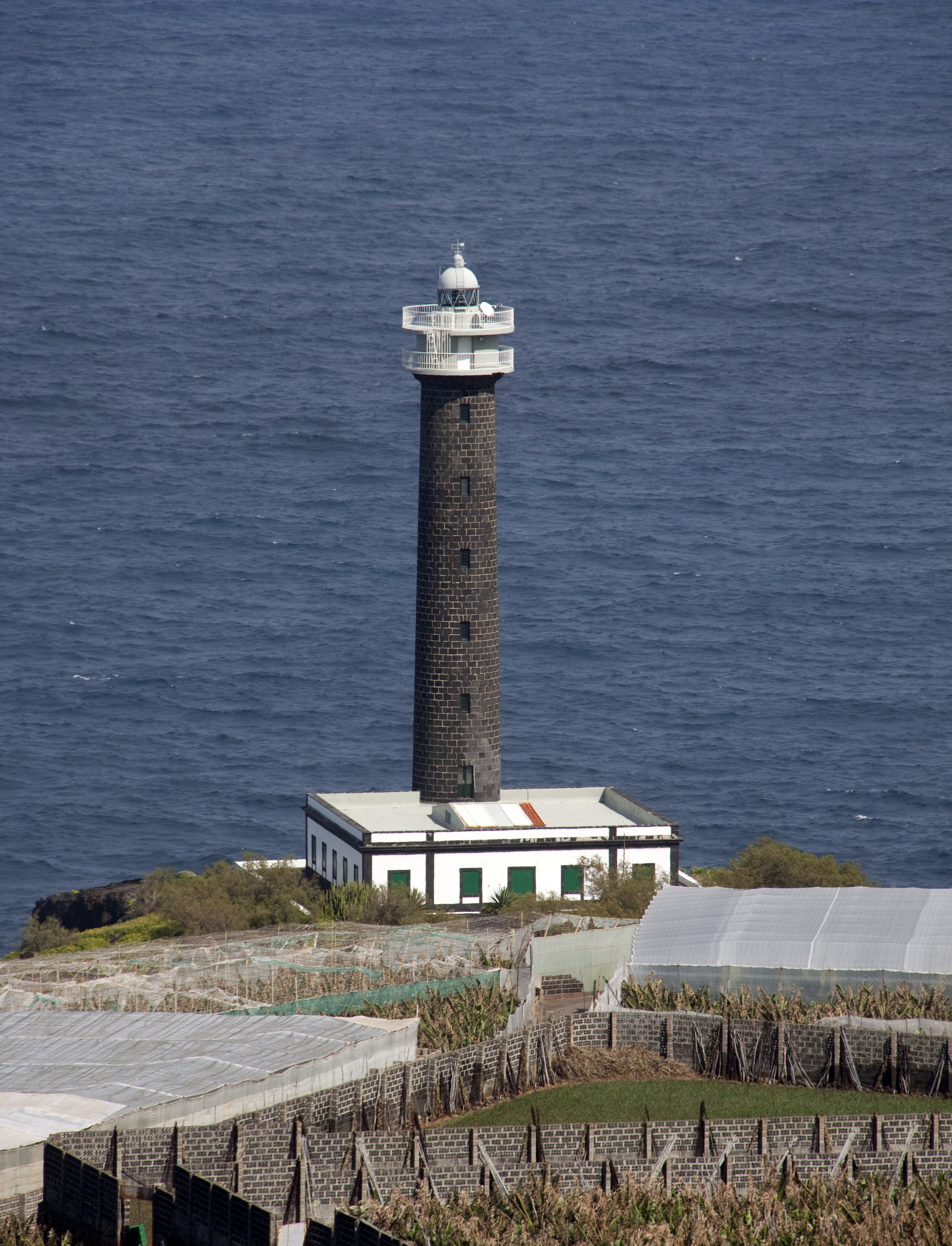
- Location: Barlovento, La Palma, Spain
- Coordinates: 28.83901°N 17.77814°W

Tower
- Constructed: 1867
- Construction: stone
- Height: 34 metres (112 ft)

Light
- First lit: 1867
- Focal height: 63 metres (207 ft)
- Lens: second order Fresnel lens
- Range: 24 nautical miles (44 km; 28 mi)
- Characteristic: Fl W 5s

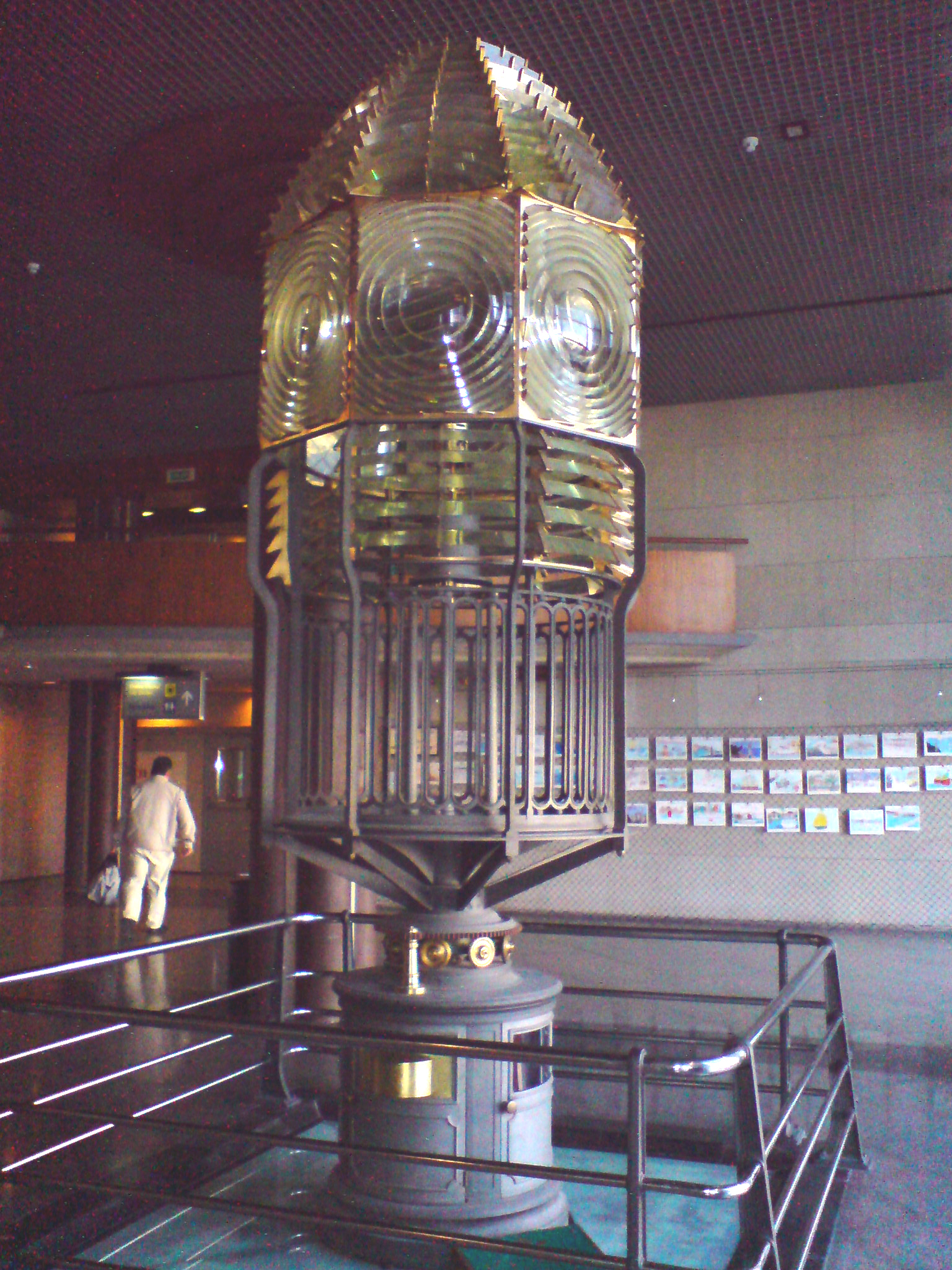
Original second-order Fresnel lens on display in 2007 within the Ferry terminal in Port of Santa Cruz de Tenerife, prior to its relocation to Barlovento in 2013

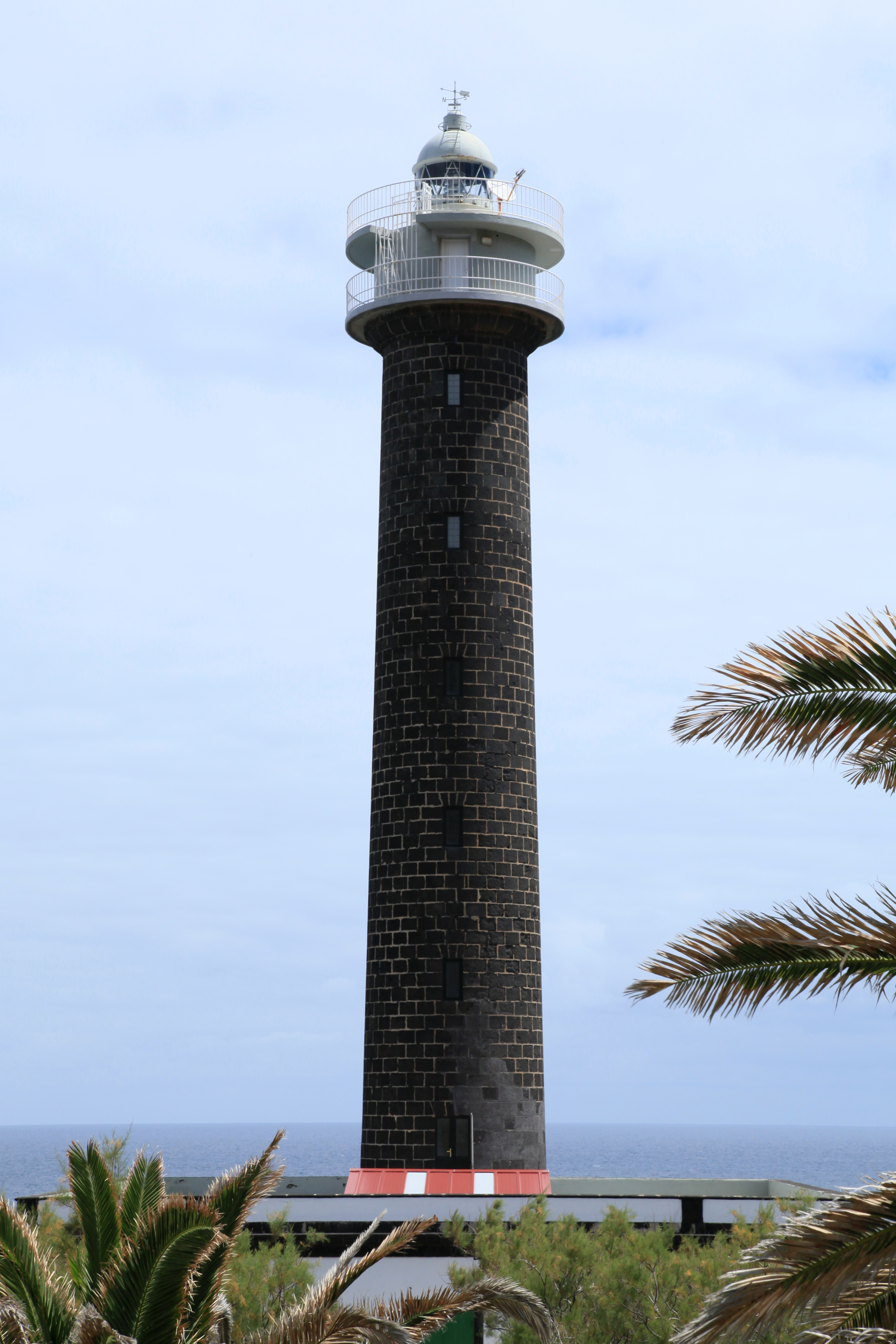
Detail of the tower

Punta Cumplida Lighthouse (Spanish: Faro de Punta Cumplida) is an active 19th century Spanish lighthouse on the Canary island of La Palma in the municipality of Barlovento. Punta Cumplida is the oldest of the four main lighthouses on La Palma, each one being located near to a different cardinal point of the island. Punta Cumplida marks the north-eastern tip; Fuencaliente the southern point, and the two modern lighthouses at Punta Lava and Arenas Blancas, the eastern and western points respectively.

== History ==
The need for a lighthouse on La Palma was included in the first maritime lighting plan for the Canaries produced in 1857, and although the site for the first light was given as Puntagorda on the north western side of the island, subsequent studies determined that it was more convenient to construct a lighthouse on the north east coast instead. The project was given approval in 1861, and the contract was awarded to Jose Rodriguez Gonzalez, a resident of Santa Cruz de la Palma at a cost of just over 500,000 reales.

The lighthouse first entered service in 1867, and was built in a similar style to other 19th century canarian lights, and consists of a whitewashed single storey keeper's house, with dark volcanic rock used for the masonry detailing. A plain masonry tower rises from the side of the house facing the Atlantic Ocean. The cylindrical tower supports two galleries and a lantern dome, which originally contained a second order Fresnel lens. In 1982, the tower was extended by 4 m to its current height of 34 m.

Punta Cumplida, was depicted as part of a set of six commemorative stamps by the Spanish postal service Correos in 2010. The five other lighthouses included the Ciutadella Lighthouse of Menorca.

The Fresnel lens from the lighthouse which was displayed inside the ferry terminal at the Port of Santa Cruz de Tenerife on Tenerife, returned to La Palma in 2013. It was installed within a specially designed structure of glass and stainless steel, and is now on view at the crossroads in Barlovento.

In 2017 it was announced that as part of the Faros de España project, the unused keeper's house at the lighthouse would be developed into high quality tourist accommodation. The Port Authority of Santa Cruz de Tenerife will renovate the building adapting it for use as tourist accommodation, but retaining certain areas for equipment needed for the operation of the lighthouse as an aid to navigation.

== LED lighting ==
In 2011 the lighthouse was converted to operate using Light-emitting diode (LED) bulbs, the first lighthouse in Europe to do so. The new lighting system consists of six vertical panels each with four bulbs; these panels are mounted on a rotating hexagonal drum, which reproduces the original light characteristic of one flash every five seconds.

Punta Cumplida was chosen for the new system, due to its high electrical consumption, which was reduced significantly by installing the 24 LED lamps. The nominal range of the new system is 24 nautical miles, although it was seen 40 nautical miles away during good atmospheric conditions by a local ferry.

== Map ==
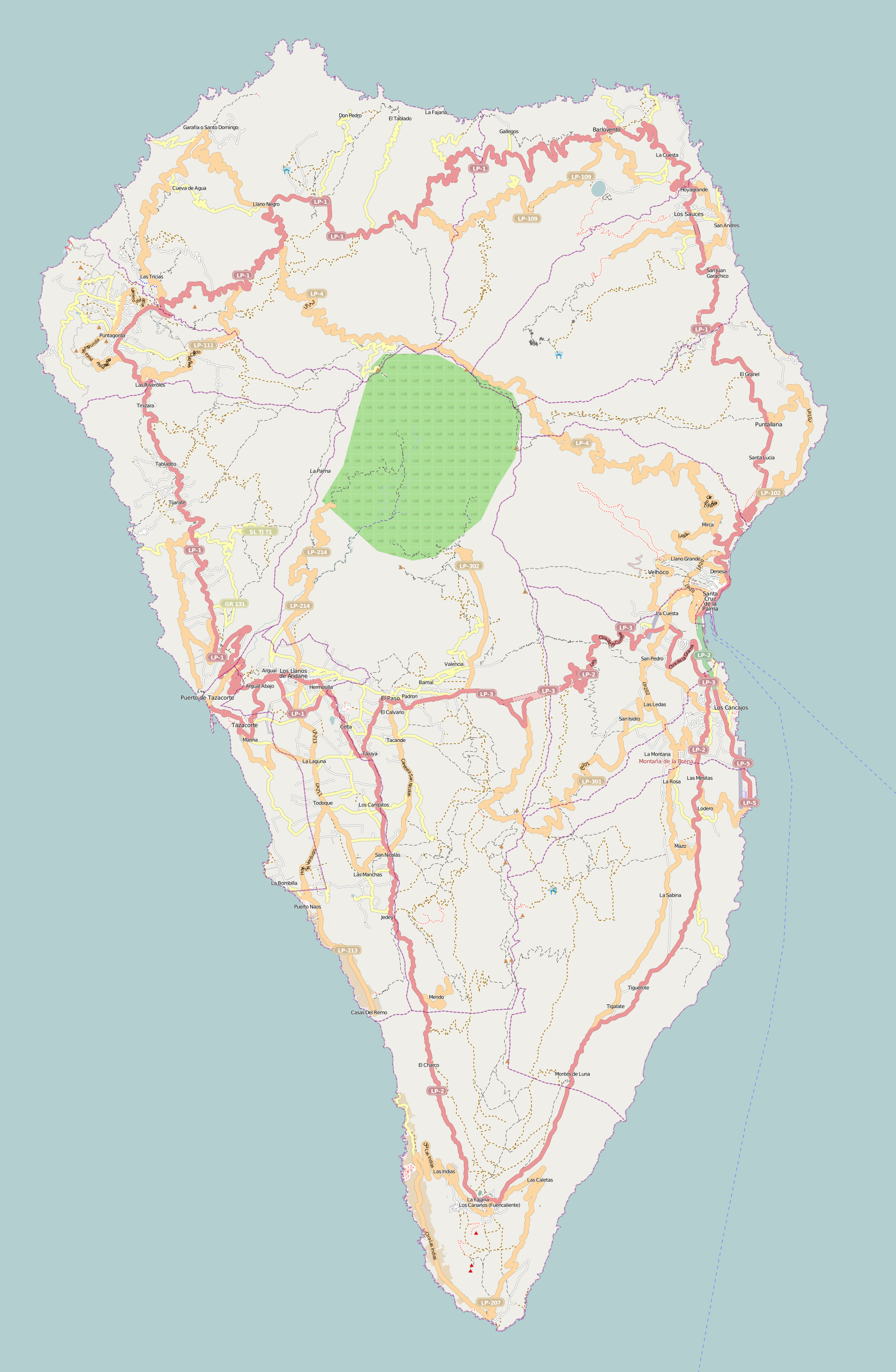
Map showing the principal lighthouses of La Palma

== See also ==
- List of lighthouses in the Canary Islands
- List of lighthouses in Spain
