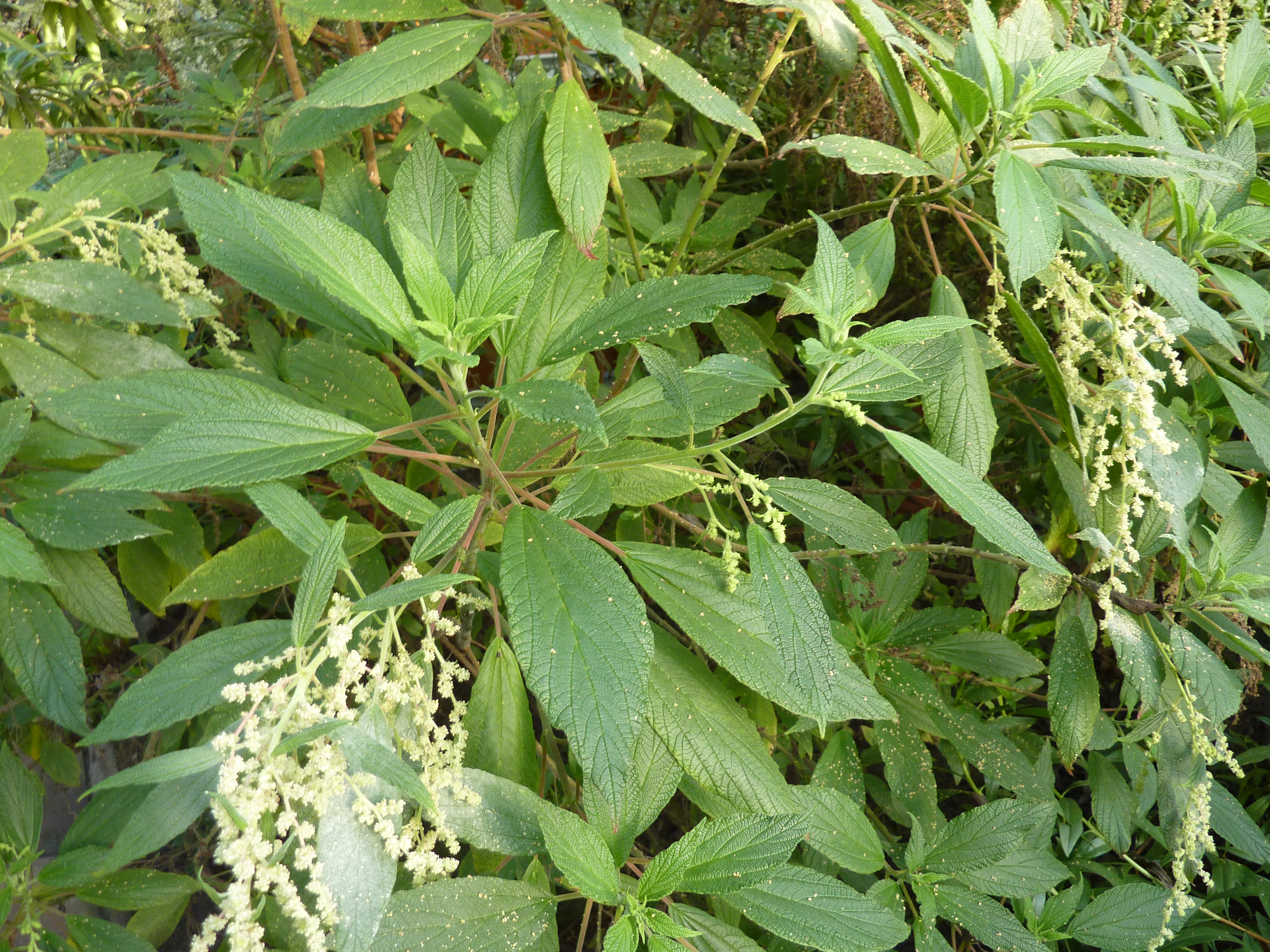
- Gesnouinia arborea

Scientific classification
- Kingdom: Plantae
- Clade: Tracheophytes
- Clade: Angiosperms
- Clade: Eudicots
- Clade: Rosids
- Order: Rosales
- Family: Urticaceae
- Genus: Gesnouinia; Gaudich.

= Gesnouinia =

Genus of flowering plants

Gesnouinia is a small genus of flowering plants in the family Urticaceae (the nettle family), endemic to the Canary Islands.

== Description ==
Gesnouinia species are shrubs with monoecious flowers (i.e. separate "male" and "female" flowers on the same plant). Two staminate ("male") flowers and one carpellate ("female") flower are grouped in each bract (involucre), which are then clustered into a panicle. The male flowers have a calyx made up of four sepals and four stamens. The female flowers have an included ovary and a short style.

== Species ==
Plants of the World Online as of 2025 accepts only one species.

Gesnouinia arborea (L.f.) Gaudich.
