= Iglesia de Nuestra Señora del Rosario, Barlovento =

Iglesia de Nuestra Señora del Rosario
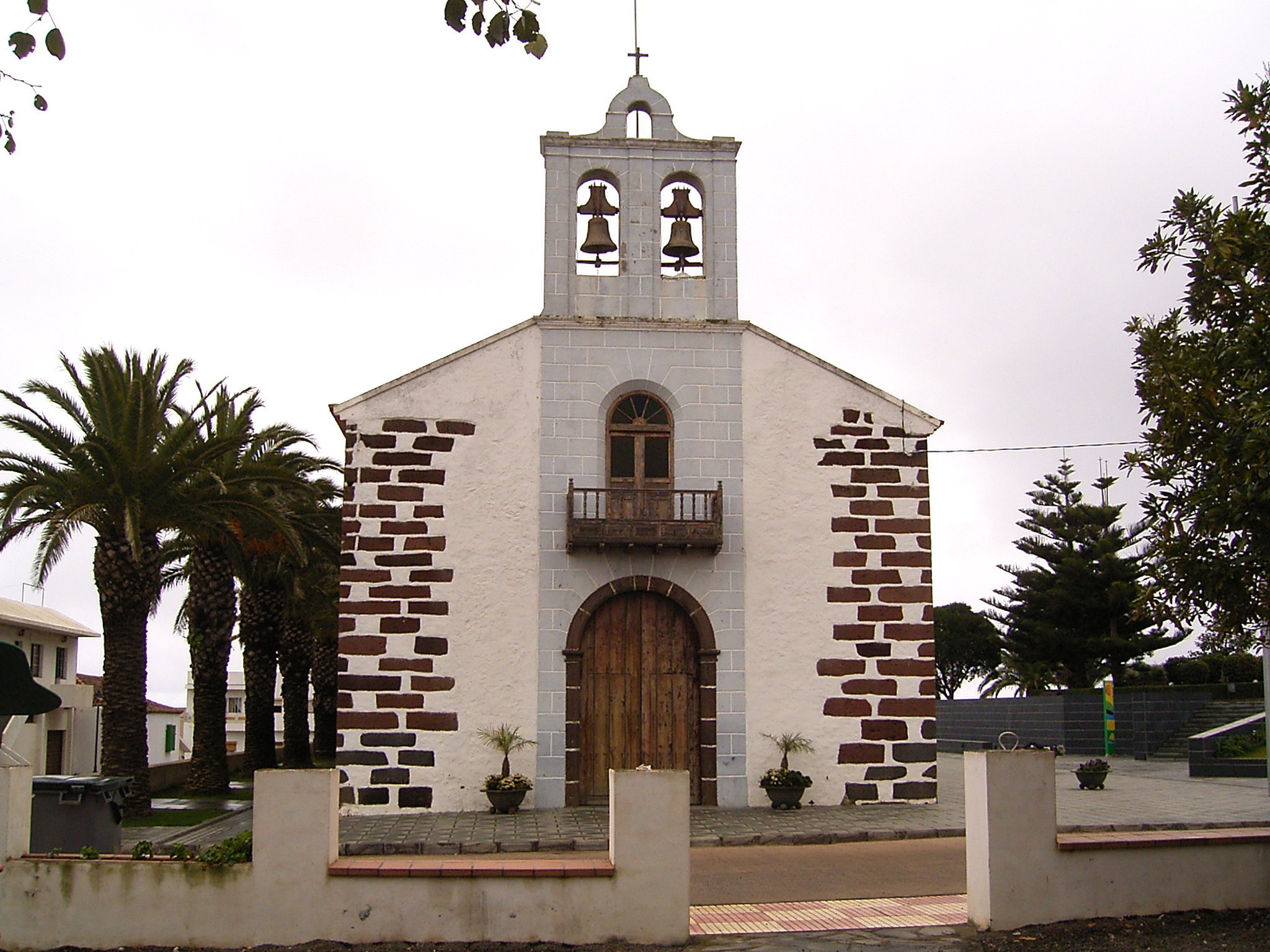
- Facade
- Iglesia de Nuestra Señora del Rosario
- 28°49′47″N 17°48′12″W
- Location: Barlovento, Santa Cruz de Tenerife
- Country: Spain
- Denomination: Catholic

History
- Dedication: Mary of the rosary

Architecture
- Functional status: active church
- Completed: 1581

Administration
- Diocese: Diocese of Canarias

The Iglesia de Nuestra Señora del Rosario is the Catholic parish church of Barlovento, Santa Cruz de Tenerife, a town on the island of La Palma of the Spanish Canary Islands. The church with a single nave was probably originally completed in 1581, with renovations and expansions in later centuries. It is a listed building of cultural interest.
