= Villa de Mazo =

- Municipality
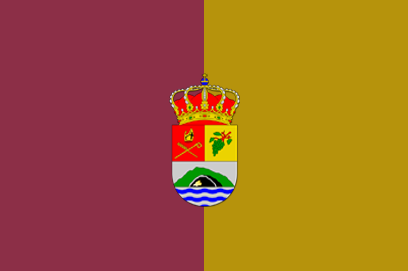
- Flag Coat of arms

- Location in Canary Islands
- Coordinates: 28°36′20″N 17°46′40″W
- Country: Spain
- Autonomous community: Canary Islands
- Province: Santa Cruz de Tenerife
- Island: La Palma

Area
  - Total: 71.17 km^{2} (27.48 sq mi)

Population (2025-01-01)
  - Total: 5,131
  - Density: 72.09/km^{2} (186.7/sq mi)

Villa de Mazo is a town and a municipality on the island of La Palma, Province of Santa Cruz de Tenerife, Canary Islands, Spain. It is situated in the southeastern part of the island. The population of the municipality is 4,858 (2013) and the area is 71.17 km². Villa de Mazo is 9 km south of the island capital Santa Cruz de La Palma. La Palma Airport is located on the coast of Villa de Mazo.

== Subdivisions ==
The population data are as of 2013:

- Callejones (pop: 350)
- Lodero (pop: 470)
- Lomo Oscuro (pop: 260)
- Malpaises (Arriba) (pop: 149)
- Monte (pop: 147)
- Monte de Breña (pop: 528)
- Monte de Luna (pop: 375)
- Monte de Pueblo (pop: 232)
- Poleal (pop: 133)
- El Pueblo (pop: 532)
- La Rosa (pop: 367)
- La Sabina (pop: 280)
- San Simón (pop: 183)
- Tigalate (pop: 325)
- Tiguerorte (pop: 228)
- Malpaises (Abajo) (pop: 299)

== Historical population ==
| Year | Population |
|---|---|
| 1900 | 4,081 |
| 1910 | 4,510 |
| 1920 | 4,651 |
| 1930 | 4,850 |
| 1940 | 5,062 |
| 1950 | 4,947 |
| 1960 | 4,736 |
| 1970 | 3,771 |
| 1980 | 3,564 |
| 1990 | 5,112 |
| 1991 | 5,069 |
| 1996 | 4,501 |
| 2001 | 4,550 |
| 2002 | 4,723 |
| 2003 | 4,762 |
| 2004 | 4,777 |
| 2013 | 4,858 |

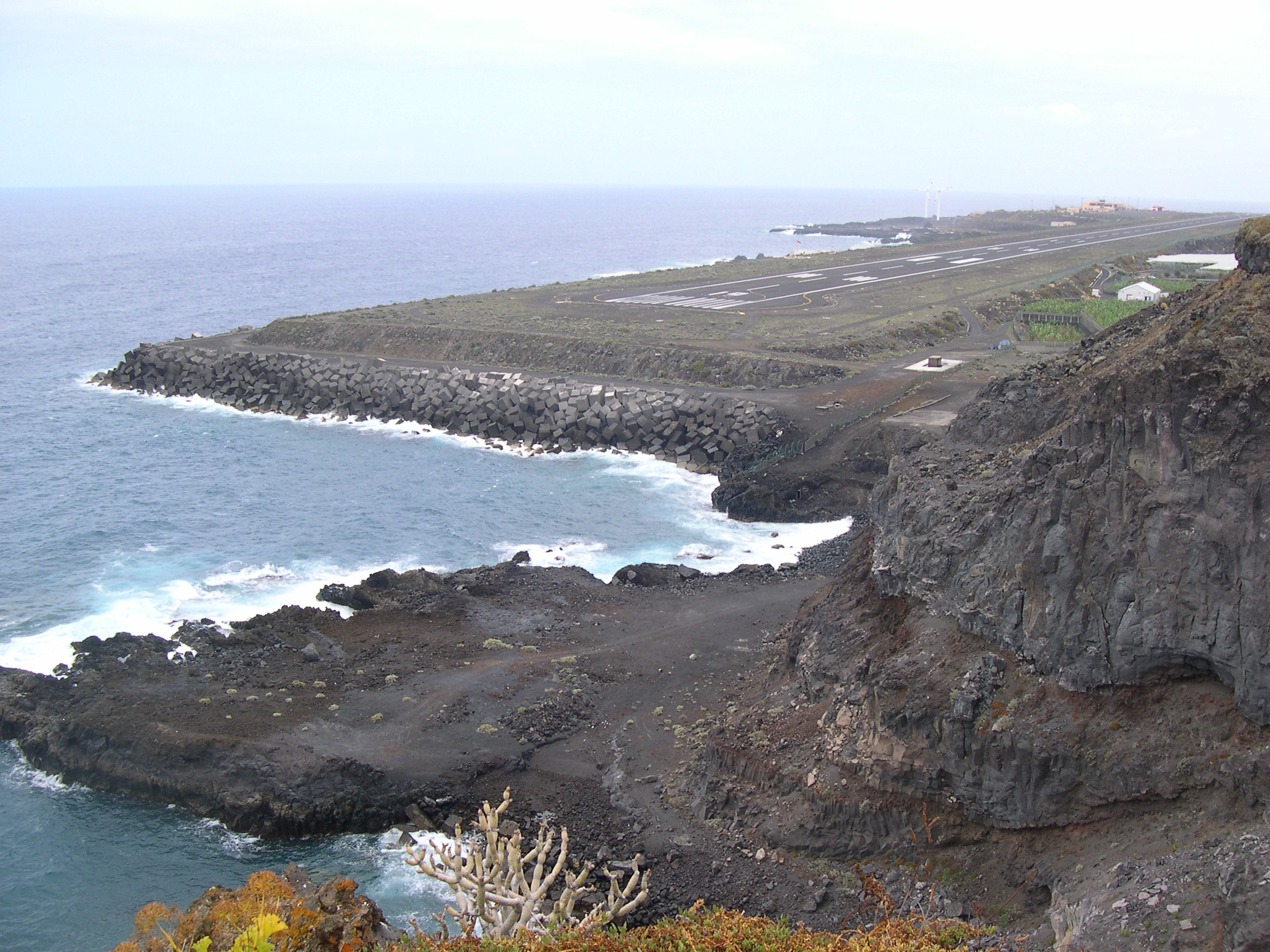
La Palma's Airport

== History ==
From the conquest of La Palma in 1492, Mazo and other rural parts of the island were governed from the town hall in Santa Cruz de la Palma. From 1768, local government in the form of so-called Ayuntamientos and presided by an elected Alcalde (equivalent of Mayor), was in place in Mazo. The municipal government in Mazo became formally independent in 1813. Originally the neighbouring municipality of Fuencaliente de La Palma formed part of the municipality of Mazo, but formed a separate municipality in 1837. Following the revolutionary upheavals of 1868, the first elections to the municipal government under the new electoral system (universal suffrage of males over 25) were held in Mazo in January 1869.

The town hall building in Mazo dates in 1930, when Spain was a Republic.

In April 1956, the municipality of Mazo came to be called Villa de Mazo, on the request of the Provincial Delegation of the Instituto Nacional de Estadística, in order to differentiate it from other places in peninsular Spain with the same or similar-sounding name, although this was not approved by government until 1958.

== Points of interest ==
Mazo is home to one of the most important archeological sites in the island of La Palma, in the Cave of Belmaco (in fact consisting of several caves close by) where rock carvings from the prehispanic period are found. The site can be visited and includes a small visitor center with exhibits of objects excavated there.

A municipal museum is hosted in the Casa Roja, a building in the town center dating from the early years of the 20th century. The exhibits display local embroidery work, of some historical importance on the island, as well as photographic and other material detailing the history of the local Festival of Corpus Christi, the largest cultural event in the municipality.

At the southern end of the municipality is the modern Arenas Blancas Lighthouse.

== See also ==
- List of municipalities in Santa Cruz de Tenerife
