= Arenas Blancas Lighthouse =

Lighthouse on La Palma, Spain

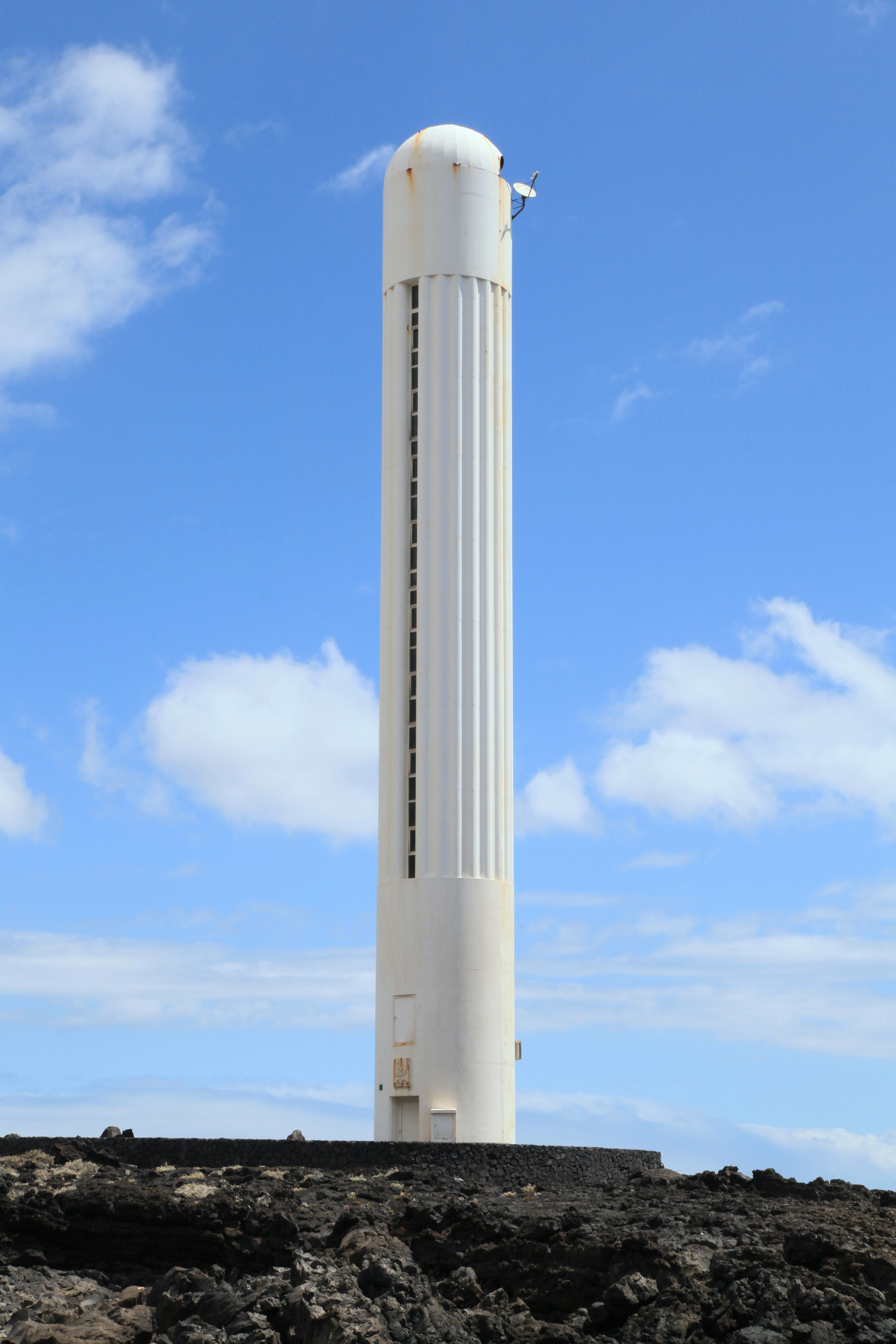
- Location: Villa de Mazo; La Palma; Canary island Spain
- Coordinates: 28.569951°N 17.760458°W

Tower
- Constructed: 1993
- Construction: concrete tower
- Height: 38 metres (125 ft)
- Shape: cylindrical tower with a spherical roof
- Markings: white tower
- Power source: mains electricity
- Operator: Comisión de faros

Light
- First lit: 1997
- Focal height: 46 metres (151 ft)
- Range: 20 nautical miles (37 km; 23 mi)
- Characteristic: L 3 oc 1 L 1 oc 1 L 1 oc 1
- Spain no.: ES-13025

The Arenas Blancas Lighthouse (Spanish: Faro de Arenas Blancas) is an active lighthouse on the Canary island of La Palma in the municipality of Villa de Mazo, near the village of La Salemera. The larger settlement of Mazo lies 8 km (5.0 mi) to the north-west.

It is one of four main lighthouses on La Palma, each one marking a different quadrant of the island. The modern lighthouses of Arenas Blancas and Punta Lava are located on the eastern and western sides of the island. The lighthouses at Punta Cumplida and Fuencaliente are situated on the northern and southern points.

== Description ==
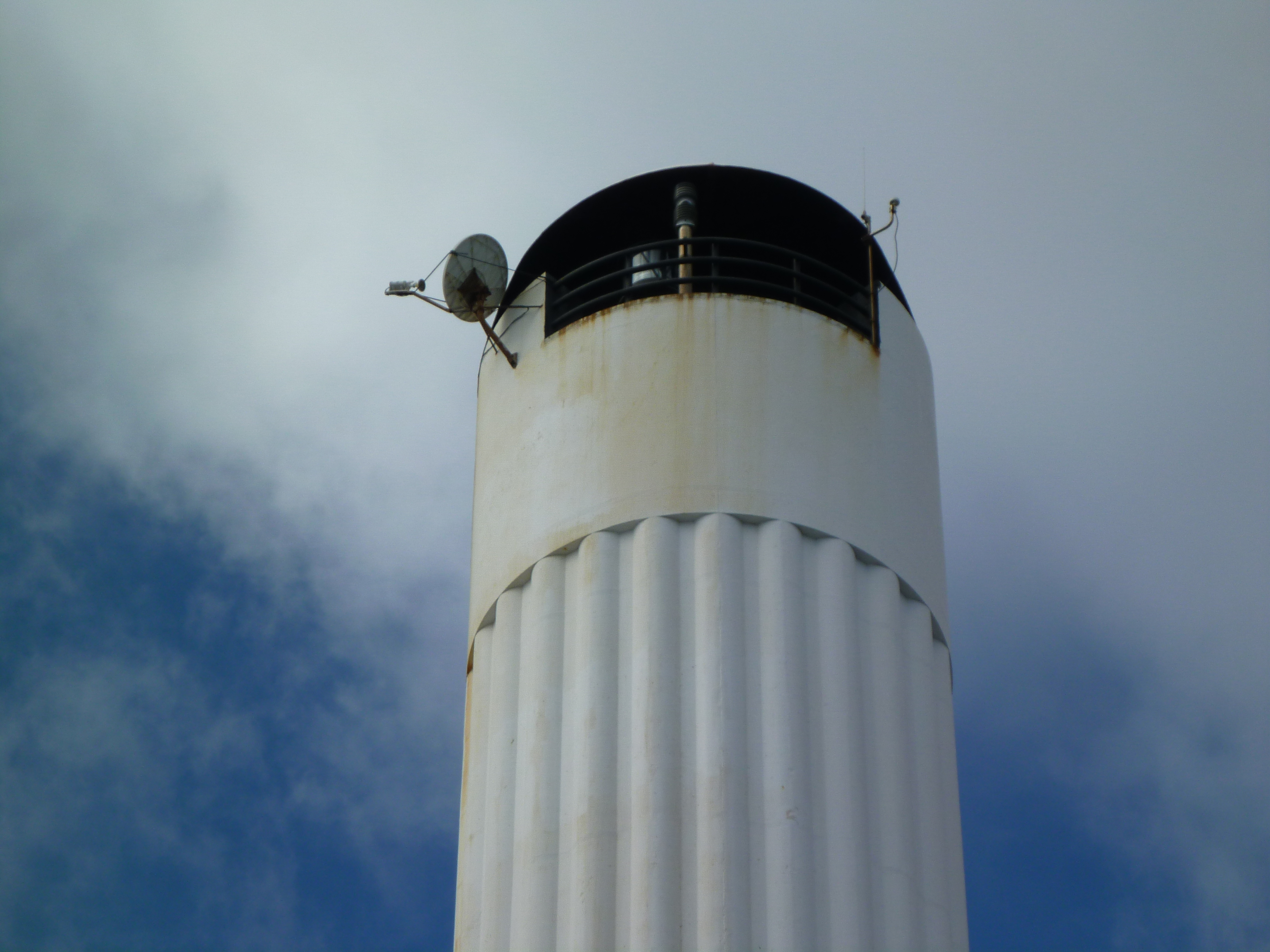
Lantern detail

The need for the lighthouse was identified in the third maritime lighting plan for the Canaries in 1989, as a navigation aid for coastal shipping on the east coast of the island. It first entered service in 1993, and stands on a cliff around eight metres above sea level, next to the Atlantic Ocean which gives the lantern a focal height of 65 metres (213 ft). The light has a range of 20 nautical miles, and has an occulting light characteristic which consists of a pattern of three flashes of white light every eight seconds.

The white cylindrical tower with a curved tip is considered to be of a "striking modern" design. The 38-metre-high (125 ft) concrete tower has fluted sides, with the light shining from a horizontal opening on the seaward side.

The lighthouse is operated and maintained by the port authority of the province of Santa Cruz de Tenerife. It is registered under the international number D2849.51 and has the national identifier of 13025.

== Map ==
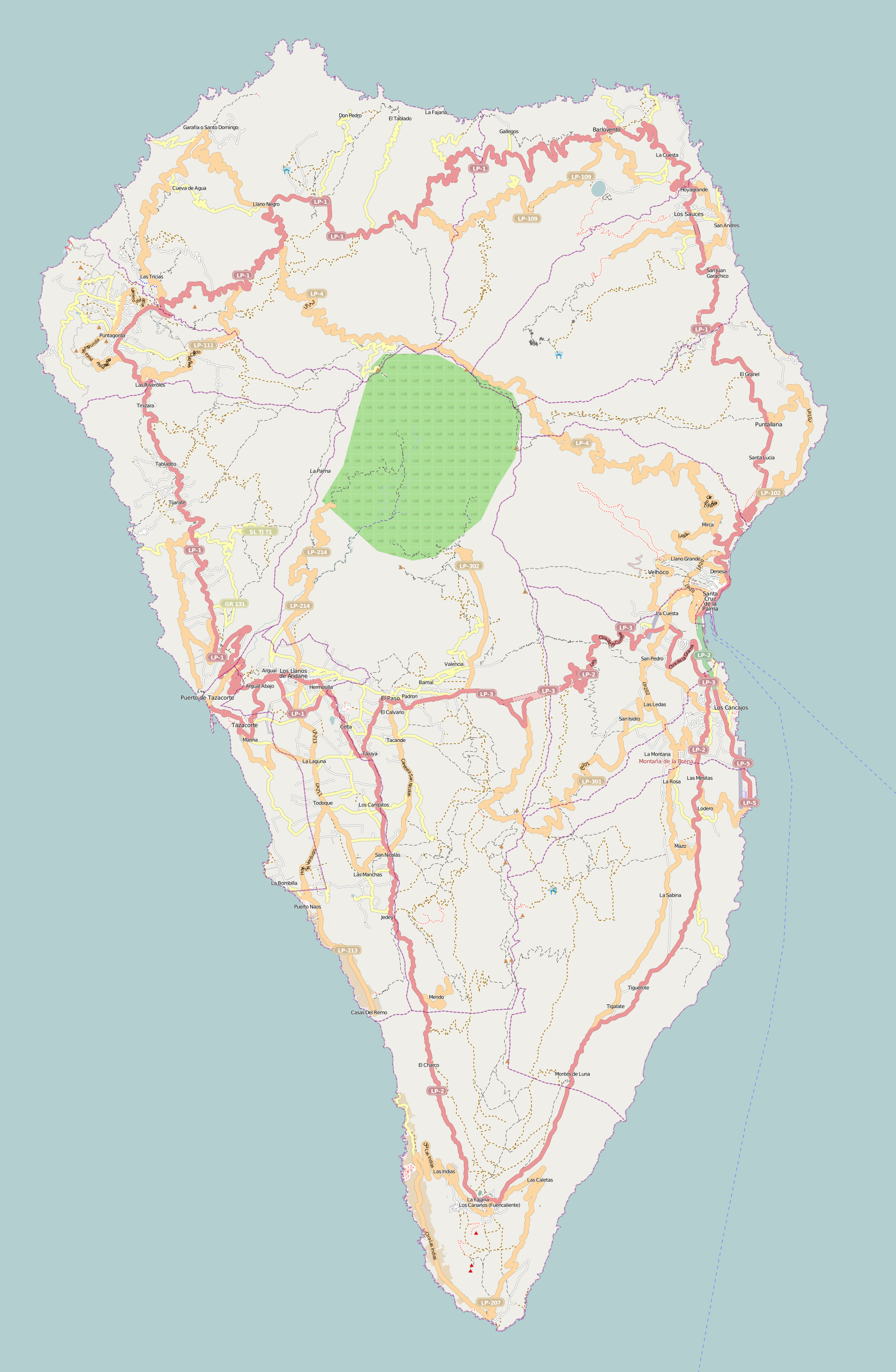
Map showing the principal lighthouses of La Palma

== See also ==
- List of lighthouses in the Canary Islands
- List of lighthouses in Spain
