= Barlovento, Santa Cruz de Tenerife =

Barlovento
- Municipality
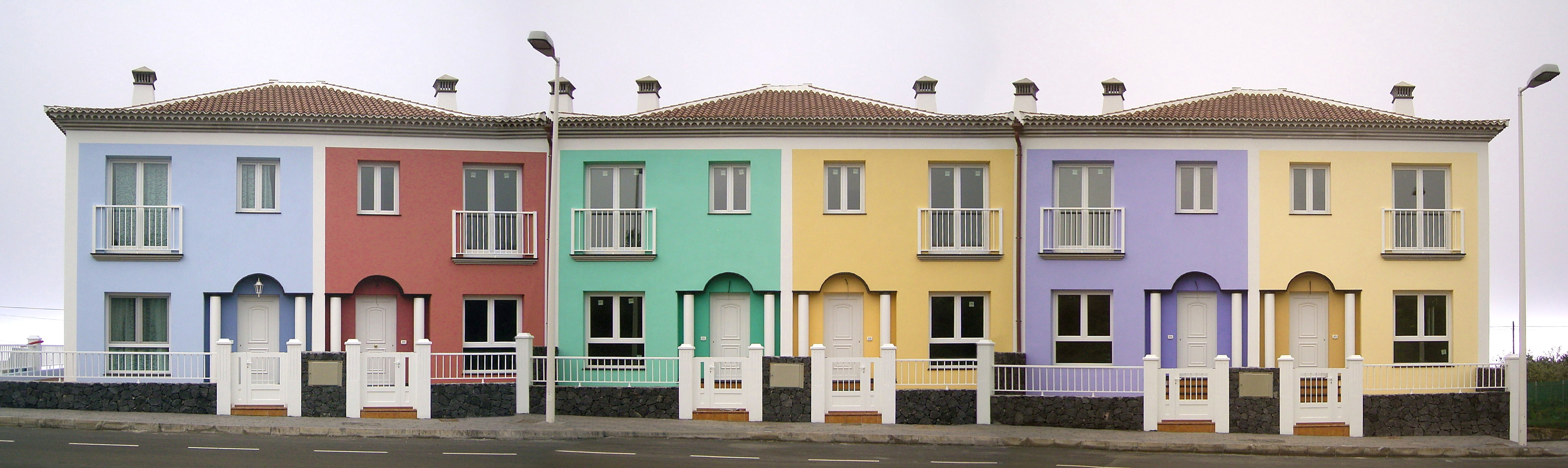

- Flag Coat of arms

- Location in La Palma

- Location in Canary Islands Barlovento (Spain, Canary Islands)
- Coordinates: 28°49′0″N 17°48′0″W
- Country: Spain
- Autonomous Community: Canary Islands
- Province: Santa Cruz de Tenerife
- Island: La Palma

Area
  - Total: 43.55 km^{2} (16.81 sq mi)
- Elevation: 548 m (1,798 ft)

Population (2025-01-01)
  - Total: 2,108
  - Density: 48.40/km^{2} (125.4/sq mi)
- Postal code: E-38726
- Climate: Csa

Barlovento (Spanish for windward) is a municipality in the northern part of the island of La Palma, one of the Canary Islands, and a part of the province of Santa Cruz de Tenerife. Barlovento is on the main highway which encircles the island. The land rises steeply from a small coastal plain, to the rim of the Caldera de Taburiente at Pico de la Cruz (2,350m)

The majority of the municipality is rural, with the only town being Barlovento, where the ayuntamiento (municipal office) is, at 548m above sea level. Being in the cloudier North East of the island, with a short, rocky, coastline, there is less tourism than other municipalities, although there are a number of casas rurales for rent. There is, however, a large recreation zone and campsite at the Laguna de Barlovento, an artificial reservoir, which is the largest area of freshwater on the island. There are also saltwater bathing pools, the Piscina Fajana, with a restaurant and other facilities at Punta del Corcho, near the Faro de Punta Complida lighthouse, at the North Eastern point of the island. There are beautiful laurisilva forests in the municipality.

The parish church of the town of Barlovento, Iglesia de Nuestra Señora del Rosario, Barlovento, dates back to the 16th century and is a listed monument.

== Historical population ==
Year	Population
1970	3,286
1981	2,772
1991	2,644
1996	2,488
2001	2,382
2002	2,378
2003	2,367
2004	2,350
2007	2,383
2013	2,085

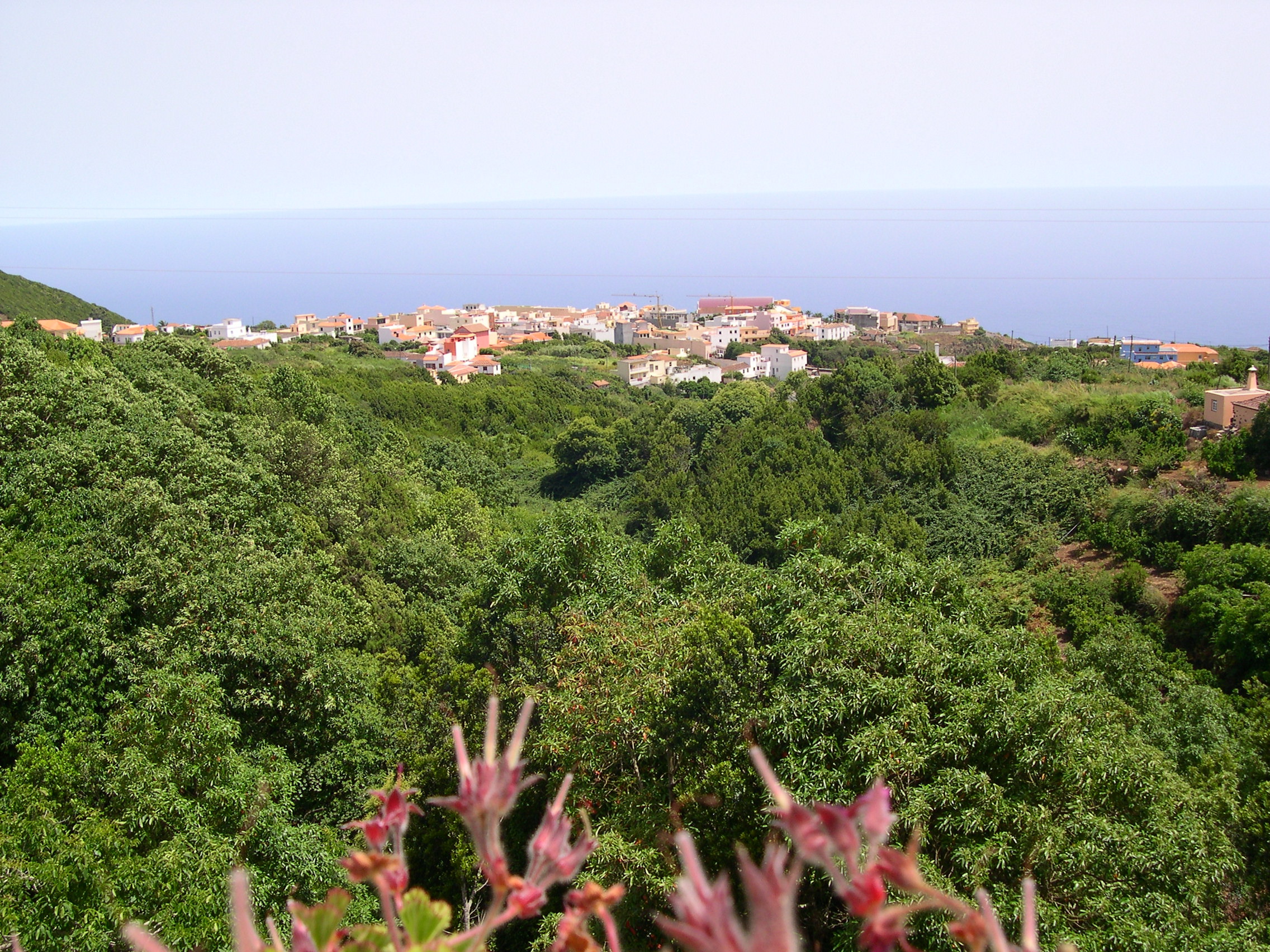
Barlovento village

== See also ==
- List of municipalities in Santa Cruz de Tenerife
