= List of lighthouses in Spain =

This is a list of lighthouses in Spain.

== Lighthouses ==
Name	Image	Location & coordinates	Province / community	Water body	Year built	Tower height	Focal height	Range
Adra		Adra; 36.74796°N 3.03098°W	Almería; Andalusia	Mediterranean	1883/1986	26 m (85 ft)	49 m (161 ft)	16 nmi (30 km)
Águilas		Águilas; 37.40169°N 1.57802°W	Murcia	Mediterranean	1860/1973	23 m (75 ft)	30 m (98 ft)	13 nmi (24 km)
Albir		L'Alfàs del Pi; 38.56363°N 0.05007°W	Alicante; Valencian Community	Mediterranean	1863	8 m (26 ft)	112 m (367 ft)	15 nmi (28 km)
Alcanada		Mallorca; 39.83541°N 3.17117°E	Balearic Islands	Mediterranean	1861	15 m (49 ft)	22 m (72 ft)	11 nmi (20 km)
Almería		Almeria; 36.82845°N 2.49231°W	Almería; Andalusia	Mediterranean	1976	7 m (23 ft)	77 m (253 ft)	19 nmi (35 km)
Arenas Blancas		La Palma; 28.56992°N 17.76056°W	Santa Cruz de Tenerife; Canary Islands	Atlantic	1993	38 m (125 ft)	46 m (151 ft)	20 nmi (37 km)
Avilés		Avilés; 43.59559°N 5.94533°W	Asturias	Atlantic	1863	15 m (49 ft)	40 m (131 ft)	20 nmi (37 km)
Barbate		Barbate; 36.18693°N 5.92323°W	Cádiz; Andalusia	Atlantic	1980	18 m (59 ft)	23 m (75 ft)	10 nmi (19 km)
Bleda Plana		Ibiza; 38.97984°N 1.15902°E	Balearic Islands	Mediterranean	1972	8 m (26 ft)	28 m (92 ft)	10 nmi (19 km)
Botafoc		Ibiza; 38.90416°N 1.45388°E	Balearic Islands	Mediterranean	1861	16 m (52 ft)	31 m (102 ft)	14 nmi (26 km)
Buenavista		Tenerife; 28.39108°N 16.83650°W	Santa Cruz de Tenerife; Canary Islands	Atlantic	1990	41 m (135 ft)	77 m (253 ft)	20 nmi (37 km)
Caballo		Santoña; 43.45149°N 3.42558°W	Cantabria	Atlantic	1863	8 m (26 ft)	24 m (79 ft)	Inactive
Cabo Canet		Canet d'en Berenguer; 39.67449°N 0.20765°W	Valencia; Valencian Community	Mediterranean	1904	30 m (98 ft)	33 m (108 ft)	20 nmi (37 km)
Cabo de Gata		Cabo de Gata; 36.72165°N 2.19288°W	Almería; Andalusia	Mediterranean	1863	19 m (62 ft)	55 m (180 ft)	24 nmi (44 km)
Cabo de la Huerta		Alicante; 38.35299°N 0.4049°W	Alicante; Valencian Community	Mediterranean	1856/1980	9 m (30 ft)	38 m (125 ft)	14 nmi (26 km)
Cabo de la Nao		Cap de la Nau; 38.73284°N 0.230005°E	Alicante; Valencian Community	Mediterranean	1928	20 m (66 ft)	122 m (400 ft)	23 nmi (43 km)
Cabo de Palos		Cape Palos; 37.63468°N 0.69026°W	Murcia	Mediterranean	1865	51 m (167 ft)	81 m (266 ft)	23 nmi (43 km)
Cabo Prior		Ferrol; 43.56761°N 8.31453°W	A Coruña; Galicia	Atlantic	1853	8 m (26 ft)	107 m (351 ft)	22 nmi (41 km)
Cabo Prioriño		Ferrol; 43.45879°N 8.34033°W	A Coruña; Galicia	Atlantic	1854	6 m (20 ft)	36 m (118 ft)	23 nmi (43 km)
Cabo de San Antonio		Cape San Antonio; 38.80307°N 0.197421°E	Alicante; Valencian Community	Mediterranean	1855/1861	17 m (56 ft)	175 m (574 ft)	26 nmi (48 km)
Cabo de Santa Pola		Santa Pola; 38.20951°N 0.51367°W	Alicante; Valencian Community	Mediterranean	1858	15 m (49 ft)	152 m (499 ft)	16 nmi (30 km)
Cabo Mayor		Santander; 43.49041°N 3.79077°W	Cantabria	Atlantic	1839	30 m (98 ft)	89 m (292 ft)	21 nmi (39 km)
Cabo Sacratif		Costa Tropical; 36.69444°N 3.46830°W	Granada; Andalusia	Mediterranean	1863	17 m (56 ft)	98 m (322 ft)	25 nmi (46 km)
Cabo Tiñoso		Campo de Cartagena; 37.53543°N 1.10810°W	Murcia	Mediterranean	1859	10 m (33 ft)	146 m (479 ft)	24 nmi (44 km)
Cabo Tortosa		Ebro Delta; 40.7155°N 0.92847°E	Tarragona; Catalonia	Mediterranean	1864/1984	18 m (59 ft)	18 m (59 ft)	14 nmi (26 km)
Cala Figuera		Mallorca; 39.45749°N 2.52237°E	Balearic Islands	Mediterranean	1860	24 m (79 ft)	45 m (148 ft)	22 nmi (41 km)
Cala Nans		Cadaqués; 42.27087°N 3.28664°E	Girona; Catalonia	Mediterranean	1864	7 m (23 ft)	33 m (108 ft)	8 nmi (15 km)
Calaburras		Mijas; 36.50737°N 4.63979°W	Málaga; Andalusia	Mediterranean	1863/1928	25 m (82 ft)	46 m (151 ft)	18 nmi (33 km)
Calella		Calella; 41.60816°N 2.64637°E	Barcelona; Catalonia	Mediterranean	1859	13 m (43 ft)	50 m (164 ft)	18 nmi (33 km)
Camarinal		Tarifa; 36.09010°N 5.81047°W	Cádiz; Andalusia	Atlantic	1989	20 m (66 ft)	75 m (246 ft)	13 nmi (24 km)
Candás		Candás; 43.59443°N 5.76097°W	Asturias	Atlantic	1897/1917	12 m (39 ft)	40 m (131 ft)	15 nmi (28 km)
Cap Blanc		Mallorca; 39.36351°N 2.78780°E	Balearic Islands	Mediterranean	1863	12 m (39 ft)	95 m (312 ft)	15 nmi (28 km)
Cap d'Artrutx		Menorca; 39.92258°N 3.82424°E	Balearic Islands	Mediterranean	1859	34 m (112 ft)	45 m (148 ft)	19 nmi (35 km)
Cap de Barbaría		Formentera; 38.6411°N 1.38951°E	Balearic Islands	Mediterranean	1972	19 m (62 ft)	78 m (256 ft)	20 nmi (37 km)
Cap de Creus		Cap de Creus; 42.31891°N 3.31592°E	Girona; Catalonia	Mediterranean	1853	11 m (36 ft)	87 m (285 ft)	20 nmi (37 km)
Cap Gros		Mallorca; 39.7971°N 2.68161°E	Balearic Islands	Mediterranean	1859	22 m (72 ft)	120 m (394 ft)	19 nmi (35 km)
Cap Salines		Mallorca; 39.26521°N 3.05341°E	Balearic Islands	Mediterranean	1863	17 m (56 ft)	17 m (56 ft)	11 nmi (20 km)
Capdepera		Mallorca; 39.71558°N 3.47752°E	Balearic Islands	Mediterranean	1861	18 m (59 ft)	76 m (249 ft)	20 nmi (37 km)
Cape Busto		Valdes; 43.56934°N 6.46963°W	Asturias	Atlantic	1858/1962	9 m (30 ft)	86 m (282 ft)	25 nmi (46 km)
Cape Cee		Corcubión; 42.91636°N 9.18379°W	A Coruña; Galicia	Atlantic	1860	8 m (26 ft)	27 m (89 ft)	7 nmi (13 km)
Cape Corrubedo		Ribeira; 42.57627°N 9.09009°W	A Coruña; Galicia	Atlantic	1854	14 m (46 ft)	32 m (105 ft)	15 nmi (28 km)
Cape de Ajo		Bareyo; 43.51155°N 3.59529°W	Cantabria	Atlantic	1985	14 m (46 ft)	71 m (233 ft)	17 nmi (31 km)
Cape Finisterre		Cape Finisterre; 42.88236°N 9.27196°W	A Coruña; Galicia	Atlantic	1853	17 m (56 ft)	143 m (469 ft)	23 nmi (43 km)
Cape Higuer		Cape Higuer; 43.392°N 1.79194°W	Gipuzkoa; Basque Country	Atlantic	1855/1881	21 m (69 ft)	65 m (213 ft)	23 nmi (43 km)
Cape Home		Cangas; 42.2533°N 8.8733°W	Pontevedra; Galicia	Atlantic	Unknown	19 m (62 ft)	38 m (125 ft)	9 nmi (17 km)
Cape Machichaco		Bermeo; 43.45419°N 2.75270°W	Biscay; Basque Country	Atlantic	1852/1909	20 m (66 ft)	122 m (400 ft)	24 nmi (44 km)
Cape Ortegal		Cariño; 43.77107°N 7.87018°W	A Coruña; Galicia	Atlantic	1984	10 m (33 ft)	124 m (407 ft)	9 nmi (17 km)
Cape Peñas		Gozón; 43.65559°N 5.84856°W	Asturias	Atlantic	1852	21 m (69 ft)	117 m (384 ft)	35 nmi (65 km)
Cape Rebordiño		Muros; 42.77005°N 9.04832°W	A Coruña; Galicia	Atlantic	1909	8 m (26 ft)	18 m (59 ft)	7 nmi (13 km)
Cape Roche		Conil de la Frontera; 36.29553°N 6.13992°W	Cádiz; Andalusia	Atlantic	1986	20 m (66 ft)	45 m (148 ft)	20 nmi (37 km)
Cape San Agustín		Coaña; 43.56359°N 6.73403°W	Asturias	Atlantic	1945/1975	20 m (66 ft)	72 m (236 ft)	20 nmi (37 km)
Cape Silleiro		Baiona; 42.10436°N 8.89655°W	Pontevedra; Galicia	Atlantic	1862/1924	30 m (98 ft)	85 m (279 ft)	17 nmi (31 km)
Cape Trafalgar		Cape Trafalgar; 36.18289°N 6.03510°W	Cádiz; Andalusia	Atlantic	1862	34 m (112 ft)	51 m (167 ft)	22 nmi (41 km)
Cape Vidio		Oviñana (Cudillero); 43.59328°N 6.24284°W	Asturias	Atlantic	1950	9 m (30 ft)	101 m (331 ft)	25 nmi (46 km)
Cape Vilán		Cape Vilan; 43.16041°N 9.21093°W	A Coruña; Galicia	Atlantic	1854/1896	25 m (82 ft)	104 m (341 ft)	28 nmi (52 km)
Carbonera		La Alcaidesa; 36.24452°N 5.30129°W	Cádiz; Andalusia	Mediterranean	1990	14 m (46 ft)	39 m (128 ft)	14 nmi (26 km)
Castellón		Castellón de la Plana; 39.96864°N 0.02784°E	Castellón; Valencian Community	Mediterranean	1867/1971	28 m (92 ft)	32 m (105 ft)	14 nmi (26 km)
Castillo de San Anton		A Coruña; 43.36556°N 8.38720°W	A Coruña; Galicia	Atlantic	1872	6 m (20 ft)	17 m (56 ft)	5 nmi (9 km)
Castillo de Santa Ana		Castro Urdiales; 43.38461°N 3.21475°W	Cantabria	Atlantic	1853	16 m (52 ft)	49 m (161 ft)	20 nmi (37 km)
Cavalleria		Menorca; 40.08909°N 4.09227°E	Balearic Islands	Mediterranean	1857	15 m (49 ft)	94 m (308 ft)	26 nmi (48 km)
Chipiona		Chipiona; 36.73787°N 6.44224°W	Cádiz; Andalusia	Atlantic	1867	63 m (207 ft)	69 m (226 ft)	25 nmi (46 km)
Ciutadella		Menorca; 39.99621°N 3.82276°E	Balearic Islands	Mediterranean	1863	13 m (43 ft)	21 m (69 ft)	14 nmi (26 km)
Columbretes		Columbretes Islands; 39.89981°N 0.68642°E	Castellón; Valencian Community	Mediterranean	1859	20 m (66 ft)	85 m (279 ft)	21 nmi (39 km)
Conillera		Ibiza; 38.99361°N 1.21262°E	Balearic Islands	Mediterranean	1857	18 m (59 ft)	85 m (279 ft)	18 nmi (33 km)
Cudillero		Cudillero; 43.56541°N 6.14469°W	Asturias	Atlantic	1858	10 m (33 ft)	44 m (144 ft)	25 nmi (46 km)
Cullera		Cullera; 39.18651°N 0.21697°W	Valencia; Valencian Community	Mediterranean	1858	16 m (52 ft)	28 m (92 ft)	19 nmi (35 km)
El Rompido		Cartaya; 37.21848°N 7.12683°W	Huelva; Andalusia	Atlantic	1861/1976	29 m (95 ft)	43 m (141 ft)	24 nmi (44 km)
En Pou		Formentera; 38.79902°N 1.42162°E	Balearic Islands	Mediterranean	1864	25 m (82 ft)	28 m (92 ft)	10 nmi (19 km)
Escombreras		Campo de Cartagena; 37.55912°N 0.96889°W	Murcia	Mediterranean	1864	8 m (26 ft)	65 m (213 ft)	17 nmi (31 km)
Estaca de Bares		Estaca de Bares; 43.78623°N 7.68430°W	A Coruña; Galicia	Atlantic	1850	10 m (33 ft)	101 m (331 ft)	25 nmi (46 km)
Estacio		La Manga; 37.74572°N 0.72592°W	Murcia	Mediterranean	1862/1976	29 m (95 ft)	32 m (105 ft)	14 nmi (26 km)
Fangar		Ebro Delta; 40.79058°N 0.76830°E	Tarragona; Catalonia	Mediterranean	1864/1986	18 m (59 ft)	20 m (66 ft)	12 nmi (22 km)
Favàritx		Menorca; 39.99724°N 4.26684°E	Balearic Islands	Mediterranean	1922	28 m (92 ft)	47 m (154 ft)	21 nmi (39 km)
Formentor		Mallorca; 39.96145°N 3.21271°E	Balearic Islands	Mediterranean	1863	21 m (69 ft)	210 m (689 ft)	24 nmi (44 km)
Fuencaliente		La Palma; 28.45528°N 17.84308°W	Santa Cruz de Tenerife; Canary Islands	Atlantic	1903/1985	24 m (79 ft)	36 m (118 ft)	14 nmi (26 km)
Garrucha		Garrucha; 37.17336°N 1.82394°W	Almería; Andalusia	Mediterranean	1881	10 m (33 ft)	19 m (62 ft)	13 nmi (24 km)
Gorliz		Gorliz; 43.43347°N 2.94379°W	Biscay; Basque Country	Atlantic	1991	21 m (69 ft)	165 m (541 ft)	22 nmi (41 km)
Illa Coelleira		O Vicedo; 43.75876°N 7.62905°W	Lugo; Galicia	Atlantic	1893	7 m (23 ft)	89 m (292 ft)	7 nmi (13 km)
Illa da Sálvora		Sálvora; 42.46586°N 9.01308°W	A Coruña; Galicia	Atlantic	1852/1921	16 m (52 ft)	38 m (125 ft)	21 nmi (39 km)
Illa de l'Aire		Menorca; 39.79945°N 4.293180°E	Balearic Islands	Mediterranean	1860	38 m (125 ft)	53 m (174 ft)	18 nmi (33 km)
Illa de Ons		Ons Island; 42.38244°N 8.93639°W	Pontevedra; Galicia	Atlantic	1865/1926	12 m (39 ft)	127 m (417 ft)	25 nmi (46 km)
Illa de Tambo		Rías Baixas; 42.40789°N 8.7078°W	Pontevedra; Galicia	Atlantic	1922	13 m (43 ft)	35 m (115 ft)	11 nmi (20 km)
Illa des Penjats		Ibiza; 38.81451°N 1.41178°E	Balearic Islands	Mediterranean	1861	17 m (56 ft)	27 m (89 ft)	10 nmi (19 km)
Illa Pancha		Ribadeo; 43.55654°N 7.04204°W	Lugo; Galicia	Atlantic	1860/1983	13 m (43 ft)	28 m (92 ft)	21 nmi (39 km)
Illas Sisargas		Malpica de Bergantiños; 43.35991°N 8.84457°W	A Coruña; Galicia	Atlantic	1853	10 m (33 ft)	110 m (361 ft)	22 nmi (41 km)
Illes Medes		Medes Islands; 42.04792°N 3.22168°E	Girona; Catalonia	Mediterranean	1868	11 m (36 ft)	87 m (285 ft)	14 nmi (26 km)
Irta		Alcossebre; 40.25996°N 0.30381°E	Castellón; Valencian Community	Mediterranean	1990	28 m (92 ft)	33 m (108 ft)	14 nmi (26 km)
Isla de Alborán		Alborán Island; 35.93800°N 3.03534°W	Almería; Andalusia	Mediterranean	1876	20 m (66 ft)	40 m (131 ft)	10 nmi (19 km)
Isla de Isabel II		Melilla; 35.18352°N 2.43097°W	Melilla	Mediterranean	1899	18 m (59 ft)	52 m (171 ft)	8 nmi (15 km)
Isla de Santa Clara		Isla de Santa Clara; 43.32188°N 1.99827°W	Gipuzkoa; Basque Country	Atlantic	1864	10 m (33 ft)	53 m (174 ft)	9 nmi (17 km)
Isla Hormiga		Cape Palos; 37.65532°N 0.64929°W	Murcia	Mediterranean	1862	12 m (39 ft)	24 m (79 ft)	8 nmi (15 km)
Isla de Mouro		Santander; 43.47328°N 3.75585°W	Cantabria	Atlantic	1860	20 m (66 ft)	39 m (128 ft)	11 nmi (20 km)
Isla Rúa		Ribeira; 42.54928°N 8.93958°W	A Coruña; Galicia	Atlantic	1869	14 m (46 ft)	25 m (82 ft)	13 nmi (24 km)
La Banya		Sant Carles de la Ràpita; 40.56046°N 0.66150°E	Tarragona; Catalonia	Mediterranean	1864/1978	26 m (85 ft)	27 m (89 ft)	12 nmi (22 km)
La Cerda		Magdalena Peninsula; 43.46685°N 3.76387°W	Cantabria	Atlantic	1870	9 m (30 ft)	24 m (79 ft)	7 nmi (13 km)
La Creu		Mallorca; 39.79695°N 2.68940°E	Balearic Islands	Mediterranean	1864/1945	13 m (43 ft)	35 m (115 ft)	10 nmi (19 km)
La farola del mar		Tenerife; 28.46935°N 16.24581°W	Santa Cruz de Tenerife; Canary Islands	Atlantic	1862	6 m (20 ft)	10 m (33 ft)	Inactive
La Guía		Vigo; 42.25953°N 8.70213°W	Pontevedra; Galicia	Atlantic	1844	9 m (30 ft)	37 m (121 ft)	12 nmi (22 km)
La Higuera		Matalascañas; 37.00746°N 6.56879°W	Huelva; Andalusia	Atlantic	1990	24 m (79 ft)	47 m (154 ft)	20 nmi (37 km)
La Isleta		Gran Canaria; 28.17408°N 15.41897°W	Las Palmas; Canary Islands	Atlantic	1865	10 m (33 ft)	249 m (817 ft)	21 nmi (39 km)
La Mola		Formentera; 38.66337°N 1.58430°E	Balearic Islands	Mediterranean	1861	22 m (72 ft)	142 m (466 ft)	23 nmi (43 km)
La Plata		Pasaia; 43.33472°N 1.93395°W	Gipuzkoa; Basque Country	Atlantic	1855	13 m (43 ft)	153 m (502 ft)	13 nmi (24 km)
Lastres		Llastres; 43.53397°N 5.30032°W	Asturias	Atlantic	1993	18 m (59 ft)	118 m (387 ft)	23 nmi (43 km)
Llanes		Llanes; 43.42014°N 4.74810°W	Asturias	Atlantic	1860/1961	8 m (26 ft)	18 m (59 ft)	15 nmi (28 km)
Llebeig		Dragonera; 39.57417°N 2.30460°E	Balearic Islands	Mediterranean	1910	15 m (49 ft)	130 m (427 ft)	21 nmi (39 km)
Llobregat		Llobregat Delta; 41.32503°N 2.15226°E	Barcelona; Catalonia	Mediterranean	1852	31 m (102 ft)	32 m (105 ft)	23 nmi (43 km)
Luarca		Luarca; 43.54972°N 6.53221°W	Asturias	Atlantic	1862	9 m (30 ft)	54 m (177 ft)	14 nmi (26 km)
Málaga		Málaga; 36.71416°N 4.41453°W	Málaga; Andalusia	Mediterranean	1817	33 m (108 ft)	38 m (125 ft)	25 nmi (46 km)
Marbella		Marbella; 36.50725°N 4.88995°W	Málaga; Andalusia	Mediterranean	1864/1974	29 m (95 ft)	35 m (115 ft)	22 nmi (41 km)
Maspalomas		Gran Canaria; 27.73513°N 15.5989°W	Las Palmas; Canary Islands	Atlantic	1890	56 m (184 ft)	60 m (197 ft)	19 nmi (35 km)
Mazarrón		Mazarrón; 37.56045°N 1.25444°W	Murcia	Mediterranean	1862/1974	11 m (36 ft)	65 m (213 ft)	15 nmi (28 km)
Melilla		Melilla; 35.29434°N 2.93243°W	Melilla	Mediterranean	1888/1918	12 m (39 ft)	40 m (131 ft)	14 nmi (26 km)
Mesa Roldán		Carboneras; 36.94168°N 1.90673°W	Almería; Andalusia	Mediterranean	1863	18 m (59 ft)	222 m (728 ft)	23 nmi (43 km)
Monte del Faro		Cies Islands; 42.21412°N 8.91571°W	Pontevedra; Galicia	Atlantic	1853/1980	10 m (33 ft)	185 m (607 ft)	16 nmi (30 km)
Monte Louro		Muros; 42.73929°N 9.07866°W	A Coruña; Galicia	Atlantic	1862	7 m (23 ft)	27 m (89 ft)	9 nmi (17 km)
Montjuïc		Montjuïc; 41.36098°N 2.16595°E	Barcelona; Catalonia	Mediterranean	1906/1925	13 m (43 ft)	108 m (354 ft)	26 nmi (48 km)
Morro Jable		Fuerteventura; 28.04613°N 14.333°W	Las Palmas; Canary Islands	Atlantic	1991	59 m (194 ft)	62 m (203 ft)	17 nmi (31 km)
Mount Igueldo		San Sebastián; 43.32259°N 2.01033°W	Gipuzkoa; Basque Country	Atlantic	1855	13 m (43 ft)	134 m (440 ft)	26 nmi (48 km)
Na Foradada		Cabrera; 39.20711°N 2.97862°E	Balearic Islands	Mediterranean	1926	13 m (43 ft)	42 m (138 ft)	10 nmi (19 km)
Na Pòpia		Dragonera; 39.58636°N 2.31713°E	Balearic Islands	Mediterranean	1852	12 m (39 ft)	363 m (1,191 ft)	Inactive
N'Ensiola		Cabrera; 39.12919°N 2.92145°E	Balearic Islands	Mediterranean	1870	21 m (69 ft)	121 m (397 ft)	20 nmi (37 km)
Nules		Nules; 39.82659°N 0.11020°W	Castellón; Valencian Community	Mediterranean	1992	36 m (118 ft)	38 m (125 ft)	14 nmi (26 km)
Oropesa del Mar		Oropesa del Mar; 40.08320°N 0.14669°E	Castellón; Valencian Community	Mediterranean	1857/1891	13 m (43 ft)	24 m (79 ft)	21 nmi (39 km)
Palamós		Palamós; 41.84153°N 3.12908°E	Girona; Catalonia	Mediterranean	1865	8 m (26 ft)	22 m (72 ft)	18 nmi (33 km)
Peñíscola		Peniscola; 40.35835°N 0.40827°E	Castellón; Valencian Community	Mediterranean	1898	11 m (36 ft)	56 m (184 ft)	23 nmi (43 km)
Peñón de Vélez de la Gomera		Peñón de Vélez de la Gomera; 35.17278°N 4.30092°W	Melilla	Mediterranean	1899	6 m (20 ft)	47 m (154 ft)	12 nmi (22 km)
Pescador		Santoña; 43.46424°N 3.43564°W	Cantabria	Atlantic	1864	13 m (43 ft)	39 m (128 ft)	17 nmi (31 km)
Portmán		Campo de Cartagena; 37.57920°N 0.84222°W	Murcia	Mediterranean	1865	8 m (26 ft)	49 m (161 ft)	13 nmi (24 km)
Porto Colom		Mallorca; 39.41402°N 3.27065°E	Balearic Islands	Mediterranean	1861	25 m (82 ft)	42 m (138 ft)	20 nmi (37 km)
Porto Pí		Mallorca; 39.54858°N 2.62362°E	Balearic Islands	Mediterranean	1617	38 m (125 ft)	41 m (135 ft)	18 nmi (33 km)
Puerto de la Cruz		Tenerife; 28.41850°N 16.55405°W	Santa Cruz de Tenerife; Canary Islands	Atlantic	1995	27 m (89 ft)	31 m (102 ft)	16 nmi (30 km)
Puerto del Rosario		Fuerteventura; 28.50534°N 13.84371°W	Las Palmas; Canary Islands	Atlantic	1992	43 m (141 ft)	48 m (157 ft)	20 nmi (37 km)
Punta Abona		Tenerife; 28.14818°N 16.42718°W	Santa Cruz de Tenerife; Canary Islands	Atlantic	1902/1978	39 m (128 ft)	54 m (177 ft)	17 nmi (31 km)
Punta Almina		Ceuta; 35.89835°N 5.28079°W	Ceuta	Mediterranean	1855	16 m (52 ft)	148 m (486 ft)	22 nmi (41 km)
Punta Atalaya		Cervo; 43.7005°N 7.4368°W	Lugo; Galicia	Atlantic	1860/1979	14 m (46 ft)	41 m (135 ft)	15 nmi (28 km)
Punta Cabalo		A Illa de Arousa; 42.57242°N 8.88399°W	Pontevedra; Galicia	Atlantic	1853	5 m (16 ft)	13 m (43 ft)	10 nmi (19 km)
Punta Candelaria		Cedeira; 43.71083°N 8.04709°W	A Coruña; Galicia	Atlantic	1954	9 m (30 ft)	89 m (292 ft)	21 nmi (39 km)
Punta Carnero		Punta Carnero; 36.07707°N 5.42619°W	Cádiz; Andalusia	Mediterranean	1874	19 m (62 ft)	42 m (138 ft)	16 nmi (30 km)
Punta Cumplida		La Palma; 28.83901°N 17.77814°W	Santa Cruz de Tenerife; Canary Islands	Atlantic	1867	34 m (112 ft)	63 m (207 ft)	24 nmi (44 km)
Punta de Anaga		Tenerife; 28.58132°N 16.14003°W	Santa Cruz de Tenerife; Canary Islands	Atlantic	1864	12 m (39 ft)	247 m (810 ft)	21 nmi (39 km)
Punta de Arinaga		Gran Canaria; 27.86407°N 15.38464°W	Las Palmas; Canary Islands	Atlantic	1897/1984	14 m (46 ft)	47 m (154 ft)	12 nmi (22 km)
Punta de la Mona		Costa Tropical; 36.72364°N 3.73207°W	Granada; Andalusia	Mediterranean	1992	14 m (46 ft)	140 m (459 ft)	15 nmi (28 km)
Punta de la Polacra		Cabo de Gata; 36.84095°N 2.00313°W	Almería; Andalusia	Mediterranean	1991	14 m (46 ft)	281 m (922 ft)	14 nmi (26 km)
Punta de l'Avançada		Mallorca; 39.89985°N 3.11064°E	Balearic Islands	Mediterranean	1905	18 m (59 ft)	29 m (95 ft)	15 nmi (28 km)
Punta de los Baños		Poniente Almeriense; 36.69580°N 2.84745°W	Almería; Andalusia	Mediterranean	1992	18 m (59 ft)	22 m (72 ft)	11 nmi (20 km)
Punta de Melenara		Gran Canaria; 27.99177°N 15.36792°W	Las Palmas; Canary Islands	Atlantic	1905	17 m (56 ft)	33 m (108 ft)	12 nmi (22 km)
Punta de Senokozulúa		Pasaia; 43.33166°N 1.92677°W	Gipuzkoa; Basque Country	Atlantic	1909	9 m (30 ft)	52 m (171 ft)	6 nmi (11 km)
Punta de Teno		Tenerife; 28.34199°N 16.92285°W	Santa Cruz de Tenerife; Canary Islands	Atlantic	1897/1976	20 m (66 ft)	60 m (197 ft)	18 nmi (33 km)
Punta del Castillete		Gran Canaria; 27.81933°N 15.76849°W	Las Palmas; Canary Islands	Atlantic	1996	21 m (69 ft)	114 m (374 ft)	17 nmi (31 km)
Punta del Hidalgo		Tenerife; 28.57637°N 16.32878°W	Santa Cruz de Tenerife; Canary Islands	Atlantic	1991	50 m (164 ft)	52 m (171 ft)	16 nmi (30 km)
Punta del Melonar		Costa Tropical; 36.71741°N 3.36853°W	Granada; Andalusia	Mediterranean	1992	12 m (39 ft)	237 m (778 ft)	14 nmi (26 km)
Punta del Picacho		Mazagón; 37.13526°N 6.82593°W	Huelva; Andalusia	Atlantic	1884	25 m (82 ft)	52 m (171 ft)	25 nmi (46 km)
Punta Delgada		Alegranza; 29.40329°N 13.48855°W	Las Palmas; Canary Islands	Atlantic	1865	15 m (49 ft)	18 m (59 ft)	12 nmi (22 km)
Punta Doncella		Estepona; 36.41687°N 5.15460°W	Málaga; Andalusia	Mediterranean	1863/1922	21 m (69 ft)	31 m (102 ft)	18 nmi (33 km)
Punta Frouxeira		Valdoviño; 43.61806°N 8.18836°W	A Coruña; Galicia	Atlantic	1994	30 m (98 ft)	75 m (246 ft)	20 nmi (37 km)
Punta Galea		Punta Galea; 43.37330°N 3.03608°W	Biscay; Basque Country	Atlantic	1950	8 m (26 ft)	84 m (276 ft)	19 nmi (35 km)
Punta Insua		Lariño; 42.77249°N 9.12503°W	A Coruña; Galicia	Atlantic	1921	14 m (46 ft)	27 m (89 ft)	15 nmi (28 km)
Punta Jandía		Fuerteventura; 28.06572°N 14.50707°W	Las Palmas; Canary Islands	Atlantic	1864/1954	19 m (62 ft)	33 m (108 ft)	22 nmi (41 km)
Punta La Entallada		Fuerteventura; 28.2301°N 13.94789°W	Las Palmas; Canary Islands	Atlantic	1955	12 m (39 ft)	196 m (643 ft)	21 nmi (39 km)
Punta Lava		La Palma; 28.59667°N 17.92568°W	Santa Cruz de Tenerife; Canary Islands	Atlantic	1993	48 m (157 ft)	51 m (167 ft)	20 nmi (37 km)
Punta Laxe		Laxe; 43.23214°N 9.01121°W	A Coruña; Galicia	Atlantic	1920	11 m (36 ft)	66 m (217 ft)	23 nmi (43 km)
Punta Martiño		Lobos; 28.76483°N 13.81490°W	Las Palmas; Canary Islands	Atlantic	1865	7 m (23 ft)	29 m (95 ft)	14 nmi (26 km)
Punta Moscarter		Ibiza; 39.11762°N 1.53317°E	Balearic Islands	Mediterranean	1978	52 m (171 ft)	93 m (305 ft)	18 nmi (33 km)
Punta Nariga		Malpica de Bergantiños; 43.32068°N 8.91010°W	A Coruña; Galicia	Atlantic	1997	39 m (128 ft)	55 m (180 ft)	22 nmi (41 km)
Punta Nati		Menorca; 40.05021°N 3.82363°E	Balearic Islands	Mediterranean	1913	19 m (62 ft)	42 m (138 ft)	18 nmi (33 km)
Punta Orchilla		El Hierro; 27.70666°N 18.14758°W	Santa Cruz de Tenerife; Canary Islands	Atlantic	1933	25 m (82 ft)	132 m (433 ft)	24 nmi (44 km)
Punta Pechiguera		Lanzarote; 28.85575°N 13.87259°W	Las Palmas; Canary Islands	Atlantic	1866/1988	50 m (164 ft)	55 m (180 ft)	17 nmi (31 km)
Punta Rasca		Tenerife; 28.00109°N 16.69439°W	Santa Cruz de Tenerife; Canary Islands	Atlantic	1976	32 m (105 ft)	51 m (167 ft)	17 nmi (31 km)
Punta Robaleira		Cangas; 42.25053°N 8.87269°W	Pontevedra; Galicia	Atlantic	Unknown	6 m (20 ft)	29 m (95 ft)	11 nmi (20 km)
Punta Roncadoira		Xove; 43.73576°N 7.5253°W	Lugo; Galicia	Atlantic	1974	14 m (46 ft)	94 m (308 ft)	21 nmi (39 km)
Punta Roncudo		Ponteceso; 43.27492°N 8.99051°W	A Coruña; Galicia	Atlantic	1920	11 m (36 ft)	38 m (125 ft)	13 nmi (24 km)
Punta San Emeterio		Ribadedeva; 43.39944°N 4.53455°W	Asturias	Atlantic	1864	9 m (30 ft)	68 m (223 ft)	20 nmi (37 km)
Punta Sardina		Gran Canaria; 28.16464°N 15.70778°W	Las Palmas; Canary Islands	Atlantic	1891/1985	20 m (66 ft)	48 m (157 ft)	20 nmi (37 km)
Punta s'Arnella		El Port de la Selva; 42.35140°N 3.18702°E	Girona; Catalonia	Mediterranean	1913	13 m (43 ft)	22 m (72 ft)	13 nmi (24 km)
Punta Silla		San Vicente de la Barquera; 43.39360°N 4.39195°W	Cantabria	Atlantic	1871	9 m (30 ft)	43 m (141 ft)	13 nmi (24 km)
Ribadesella		Ribadesella; 43.47284°N 5.08294°W	Asturias	Atlantic	1861	8 m (26 ft)	115 m (377 ft)	25 nmi (46 km)
Roquetas de Mar		Roquetas de Mar; 36.75332°N 2.60625°W	Almería; Andalusia	Mediterranean	1863	12 m (39 ft)	Unknown	Inactive
Roses		Roses; 42.24587°N 3.18317°E	Girona; Catalonia	Mediterranean	1864	11 m (36 ft)	24 m (79 ft)	12 nmi (22 km)
Rota		Rota; 36.61601°N 6.35723°W	Cádiz; Andalusia	Atlantic	1980	28 m (92 ft)	34 m (112 ft)	17 nmi (31 km)
Sa Mola		Mallorca; 39.53175°N 2.36425°E	Balearic Islands	Mediterranean	1993	10 m (33 ft)	128 m (420 ft)	12 nmi (22 km)
Sabinal		Poniente Almeriense; 36.68685°N 2.70129°W	Almería; Andalusia	Mediterranean	1863/1926	32 m (105 ft)	34 m (112 ft)	16 nmi (30 km)
Salou		Salou; 41.05573°N 1.17204°E	Tarragona; Catalonia	Mediterranean	1858	11 m (36 ft)	43 m (141 ft)	23 nmi (43 km)
San Anton		San Anton; 43.31047°N 2.20130°W	Gipuzkoa; Basque Country	Atlantic	1863	14 m (46 ft)	93 m (305 ft)	21 nmi (39 km)
San Cristóbal		La Gomera; 28.09609°N 17.10007°W	Santa Cruz de Tenerife; Canary Islands	Atlantic	1903/1978	15 m (49 ft)	84 m (276 ft)	21 nmi (39 km)
San Sebastian		Castle of San Sebastián; 36.52833°N 6.31606°W	Cádiz; Andalusia	Atlantic	1913	37 m (121 ft)	39 m (128 ft)	25 nmi (46 km)
Sancti Petri		Islote de Sancti Petri; 36.38032°N 6.22015°W	Cádiz; Andalusia	Atlantic	1918	18 m (59 ft)	20 m (66 ft)	9 nmi (17 km)
Sant Cristòfol		Vilanova i la Geltrú; 41.21695°N 1.73726°E	Barcelona; Catalonia	Mediterranean	1866/1905	21 m (69 ft)	27 m (89 ft)	19 nmi (35 km)
Sant Sebastià		Sant Sebastià de la Guarda; 41.89620°N 3.20252°E	Girona; Catalonia	Mediterranean	1857	13 m (43 ft)	167 m (548 ft)	32 nmi (59 km)
Santa Catalina		Lekeitio; 43.37716°N 2.50996°W	Biscay; Basque Country	Atlantic	1862	13 m (43 ft)	46 m (151 ft)	17 nmi (31 km)
Suances		Suances; 43.44204°N 4.04317°W	Cantabria	Atlantic	1863	9 m (30 ft)	35 m (115 ft)	22 nmi (41 km)
Tabarca		Tabarca; 38.16408°N 0.47116°W	Alicante; Valencian Community	Mediterranean	1854	14 m (46 ft)	29 m (95 ft)	14 nmi (26 km)
Tagomago		Ibiza; 39.03257°N 1.64909°E	Balearic Islands	Mediterranean	1914	23 m (75 ft)	86 m (282 ft)	21 nmi (39 km)
Tapia de Casariego		Tapia de Casariego; 43.57444°N 6.94611°W	Asturias	Atlantic	1859	10 m (33 ft)	24 m (79 ft)	18 nmi (33 km)
Tarifa		Isla de Las Palomas; 36.00118°N 5.60962°W	Cádiz; Andalusia	Atlantic	1854	33 m (108 ft)	41 m (135 ft)	26 nmi (48 km)
Tazones		Tazones; 43.54787°N 5.39905°W	Asturias	Atlantic	1864	11 m (36 ft)	127 m (417 ft)	20 nmi (37 km)
Torre del Mar		Torre del Mar; 36.73498°N 4.09619°W	Málaga; Andalusia	Mediterranean	1864/1974	28 m (92 ft)	30 m (98 ft)	13 nmi (24 km)
Torre den Beu		Mallorca; 39.32966°N 3.17699°E	Balearic Islands	Mediterranean	Unknown	6 m (20 ft)	32 m (105 ft)	10 nmi (19 km)
Torredembarra		Torredembarra; 41.13220°N 1.39487°E	Tarragona; Catalonia	Mediterranean	2000	38 m (125 ft)	58 m (190 ft)	17 nmi (31 km)
Torres		Gijón; 43.57189°N 5.69923°W	Asturias	Atlantic	1865/1924	12 m (39 ft)	82 m (269 ft)	18 nmi (33 km)
Torrox		Torrox; 36.72655°N 3.95735°W	Málaga; Andalusia	Mediterranean	1864	23 m (75 ft)	29 m (95 ft)	20 nmi (37 km)
Tossa del Mar		Tossa de Mar; 41.71561°N 2.93400°E	Girona; Catalonia	Mediterranean	1919	12 m (39 ft)	60 m (197 ft)	21 nmi (39 km)
Tostón		Fuerteventura; 28.71539°N 14.01368°W	Las Palmas; Canary Islands	Atlantic	1897/1986	30 m (98 ft)	35 m (115 ft)	17 nmi (31 km)
Touriñán		Cabo Touriñán; 43.05336°N 9.29814°W	A Coruña; Galicia	Atlantic	1898/1981	11 m (36 ft)	65 m (213 ft)	24 nmi (44 km)
Tower of Hercules		A Coruña; 43.38594°N 8.40648°W	A Coruña; Galicia	Atlantic	~110	55 m (180 ft)	106 m (348 ft)	23 nmi (43 km)
Tramuntana		Dragonera; 39.59803°N 2.33818°E	Balearic Islands	Mediterranean	1910	15 m (49 ft)	67 m (220 ft)	14 nmi (26 km)
Valencia		Port of Valencia; 39.44910°N 0.30223°W	Valencia; Valencian Community	Mediterranean	1866/1904	22 m (72 ft)	30 m (98 ft)	20 nmi (37 km)
Zumaia		Zumaia; 43.30216°N 2.25102°W	Gipuzkoa; Basque Country	Atlantic	1882	12 m (39 ft)	41 m (135 ft)	12 nmi (22 km)

== By autonomous communities ==
- List of lighthouses in the Balearic Islands
- List of lighthouses in the Canary Islands

== See also ==
- Lists of lighthouses and lightvessels
- List of tallest lighthouses
