= List of shipwrecks in June 1845 =

The list of shipwrecks in June 1845 includes ships sunk, foundered, wrecked, grounded, or otherwise lost during June 1845.

== 1 June ==
List of shipwrecks: 1 June 1845
Ship	State	Description
Hero	United Kingdom	The ship ran aground on the Knowl Sand, in the North Sea off the coast of Norfolk. She was refloated and resumed her voyage.
Hoppet	(Russian Empire) Grand Duchy of Finland	The full-rigged ship was destroyed by fire near "Ivica". Her crew were rescued. She was on a voyage from Naples, Kingdom of the Two Sicilies to a Spanish port.

== 2 June ==
List of shipwrecks: 2 June 1845
Ship	State	Description
Active	United Kingdom	The ship was driven ashore at Flamborough Head, Yorkshire. She was on a voyage from London to Stockton-on-Tees, County Durham.

== 3 June ==
List of shipwrecks: 3 June 1845
Ship	State	Description
Irma	France	The ship struck the Cabegas Rocks. She put in to Gibraltar in a sinking condition.

== 4 June ==
List of shipwrecks: 4 June 1845
Ship	State	Description
Alpha	(United Kingdom of Great Britain and Ireland) Van Diemen's Land	The ship was driven ashore at Launceston, Van Diemen's Land. She was on a voyage from Port Phillip, Victoria to Launceston.
Four Brothers	United Kingdom	The ship was driven ashore at Stromness, Orkney Islands. She was on a voyage from South Shields, County Durham to Fort William, Inverness-shire.
Husey	United Kingdom	The ship ran aground on the Foreness Rock, Margate, Kent.
Lady Nepean	United Kingdom	The ship was wrecked on the Sunk Sand, in the North Sea off the coast of Essex. Her crew were rescued.
Rover	United Kingdom	The ship ran aground on the Red Bank, in the Gambia River and was damaged.
Tobago	(United Kingdom of Great Britain and Ireland) New South Wales	The brig was driven ashore and wrecked at Launceston, Van Diemen's Land. All on board were rescued.
Triton	United Kingdom	The ship was abandoned in the Atlantic Ocean. Her crew were rescued.

== 5 June ==
List of shipwrecks: 5 June 1845
Ship	State	Description
Cordelia	United Kingdom	The brig sprang a leak and foundered in the Atlantic Ocean 1,200 nautical miles (2,200 km) east of Barbados. Her crew survived. She was on a voyage from Belfast, County Antrim to Barbados.
Ellen or Helen	United Kingdom	The ship was wrecked at Porthleven, Cornwall with the loss of six lives. She was on a voyage from Llanelly, Glamorgan to London.
Sampson	(United Kingdom of Great Britain and Ireland) New South Wales	The ship ran aground, capsized and sank at Lake Macquarie. Her five crew survived.
Twin Brothers	United Kingdom	The ship ran aground in the Sound of Hoy. She was on a voyage from Newcastle upon Tyne, Northumberland to Fort William, Inverness-shire. She was refloated and taken in to Stromness, Orkney Islands.

== 6 June ==
List of shipwrecks: 6 June 1845
Ship	State	Description
Edward Gray	United Kingdom	The ship was wrecked on the North West Cayes. She was on a voyage from Arichat, Nova Scotia, British North America to Jamaica.
Emanuel	United Kingdom	The ship ran aground at Redcar, Yorkshire. She was on a voyage from Antwerp, Belgium to Stockton-on-Tees, County Durham. She was refloated and taken in to Middlesbrough, Yorkshire.
Fly	United Kingdom	The flat sank in the River Mersey with the loss of one life.
St. Nicolo	Russia	The ship foundered in the Black Sea off Taganrog.

== 7 June ==
List of shipwrecks: 7 June 1845
Ship	State	Description
Alpha	(United Kingdom of Great Britain and Ireland) South Australia	The ship was driven ashore near Launceston, Van Diemen's Land. She was on a voyage from Port Phillip to Launceston.

== 8 June ==
List of shipwrecks: 8 June 1845
Ship	State	Description
Coquette	France	The ship was wrecked in the Magdalen Islands, Nova Scotia, British North America. Her crew were rescued.
Surrey	United Kingdom	The barque ran aground on the Skitler Sand, in the North Sea.
Virgo	United Kingdom	The ship ran aground on the Shipwash Sand, in the North Sea off the coast of Essex. She was on a voyage from South Shields, County Durham to Honfleur, Calvados, France. She was refloated and taken in to Great Yarmouth, Norfolk in a leaky condition.

== 9 June ==
List of shipwrecks: 9 June 1845
Ship	State	Description
Jane	(United Kingdom of Great Britain and Ireland) Grenada	The sloop was wrecked in Crocher Bay.
Newark	United Kingdom	The barque was wrecked 26 nautical miles (48 km) south of the Carysfort Reef.
Rebecca	(United Kingdom of Great Britain and Ireland) Grenada	The sloop was wrecked in Grenville Bay.

== 10 June ==
List of shipwrecks: 10 June 1845
Ship	State	Description
Farmer	United Kingdom	The ship ran aground on the Herd Sand, in the North Sea off the coast of County Durham. She was on a voyage from Brixham, Devon to South Shields, County Durham. She was refloated.
Félicité	France	The ship was driven against the mole at Algiers, Algeria and sank.
Hazelrigg	United Kingdom	The brig was wrecked at Punta de Calaburras, Spain. She was on a voyage from Málaga, Spain to Quebec City, Province of Canada, British North America.
Oscar	United Kingdom	The ship sprang a leak and capsized off Lindesnes, Norway. She subsequently came ashore near Lodshavn.
Thetis	United Kingdom	The ship ran aground off Saltholm, Denmark. She was on a voyage from Liverpool, Lancashire to Saint Petersburg, Russia. She was refloated.

== 11 June ==
List of shipwrecks: 11 June 1845
Ship	State	Description
London	United Kingdom	The ship was driven ashore near Ramsgate, Kent. She was on a voyage from Hartlepool, County Durham to Sandwich, Kent. She was refloated and resumed her voyage.
Rosebud	United Kingdom	The ship was driven ashore in the Sound of Culree.
St. Piero	Flag unknown	The ship was wrecked east of Bermuda.

== 12 June ==
List of shipwrecks: 12 June 1845
Ship	State	Description
Phoenix	France	The ship ran aground in the Seine.
Venture	(United Kingdom of Great Britain and Ireland) New South Wales	The cutter was driven ashore and wrecked in Lady Bay, Sydney Harbour. Her crew survived. She was on a voyage from Sydney to the Hawkesbury River.

== 13 June ==
List of shipwrecks: 13 June 1845
Ship	State	Description
Adeline	United Kingdom	The ship foundered east of the Grand Banks of Newfoundland. All on board were rescued by Mary (United Kingdom).
Feliz	France	The brig ran aground and was damaged on the Long Sand, in the North Sea off the coast of Essex, United Kingdom. She was on a voyage from Newcastle upon Tyne, Northumberland, United Kingdom to Cette, Hérault. She was refloated on 17 June and taken in to Wivenhoe, Essex.
Fides	United Kingdom	The sloop sprang a leak and was beached at Warkworth, Northumberland. Her crew were rescued. She was on a voyage from Alnmouth to Warkworth. She was later refloated.

== 14 June ==
List of shipwrecks: 14 June 1845
Ship	State	Description
Archer	United Kingdom	The ship ran aground at North Shields, County Durham. She was later refloated.
British Queen	(United Kingdom of Great Britain and Ireland) British North America	The ship was wrecked on the south coast of Prince Edward Island. Her crew were rescued.
Camilla	United Kingdom	The ship departed from Demerara, British Guiana for Cork. No further trace, presumed foundered with the loss of all hands.
Felix	United Kingdom	The ship was wrecked on the Long Sand, in the North Sea off the coast of Essex. Her crew were rescued. She was on a voyage from Newcastle upon Tyne to Cette, Hérault, France.

== 16 June ==
List of shipwrecks: 16 June 1845
Ship	State	Description
Lady Jane	United Kingdom	The ship ran aground 2 nautical miles (3.7 km) west of Garrucha, Spain. Her crew were rescued. She subsequently became a wreck.
Sheraton Grange	United Kingdom	The ship ran aground south of Kronstadt, Russia. She was on a voyage from Liverpool, Lancashire to Saint Petersburg, Russia. She had been refloated by 19 June and taken in to Saint Petersburg.

== 17 June ==
List of shipwrecks: 17 June 1845
Ship	State	Description
Caroline	Bremen	The ship foundered in the North Sea off Callantsoog, North Holland, Netherlands. She was on a voyage from Hartlepool, County Durham, United Kingdom to Bremen.
Newcastle	United Kingdom	The ship was driven ashore in Killala Bay. She was on a voyage from Liverpool. Lancashire to Ballina, County Mayo. She was refloated the next day and taken in to Ballina in a leaky condition.
Pelican	(United Kingdom of Great Britain and Ireland) Jersey	The ship was sunk by ice off the coast of Labrador, British North America. Her crew were rescued.

== 18 June ==
List of shipwrecks: 18 June 1845
Ship	State	Description
Amity	(United Kingdom of Great Britain and Ireland) South Australia	The brig was wrecked on the south east coast of Flinders Island, Van Diemen's Land. All on board survives. She was on a voyage from Hobart, Van Diemen's Land to Port Albert, New South Wales.
Express	(United Kingdom of Great Britain and Ireland) Barbados	The schooner departed from Antigua for Barbados. No further trace, presumed foundered with the loss of all hands.

== 19 June ==
List of shipwrecks: 19 June 1845
Ship	State	Description
Elizabeth	United Kingdom	The ship was driven ashore on "Inchgaril". She was on a voyage from Bo'ness, Lothian to Stettin. She was refloated and taken in to "St. David's".
Hermann	Flag unknown	The ship ran aground near "Bongstedt". She was refloated and taken in to Helsingør, Denmark in a leaky condition.
Uruguay	United Kingdom	The East Indiaman caught fire, exploded and sank off the Cape Verde Islands. Her 21 crew took to the ship's boats; they were rescued three days later. She was on a voyage from Liverpool, Lancashire to China.

== 20 June ==
List of shipwrecks: 20 June 1845
Ship	State	Description
Amity	United Kingdom	The ship ran aground on Clee Skerry, Orkney Islands. She was refloated and beached at Stromness.
Countess of Errol	United Kingdom	The ship ran aground on the Greek Bank, off Taganrog, Russia. She was refloated.
Vulcan	(United Kingdom of Great Britain and Ireland) South Australia	The schooner was driven ashore and wrecked at Adelaide.

== 21 June ==
List of shipwrecks: 21 June 1845
Ship	State	Description
Angelique	United Kingdom	The ship was driven ashore at Amsterdam, North Holland, Netherlands. She was refloated.
Beulah	United Kingdom	The ship foundered in the Irish Sea 6 nautical miles (11 km) off St. Bees Head, Cumberland. She was on a voyage from Whitehaven, Cumberland to Port St. Mary, Isle of Man.
C. C.	United Kingdom	The ship was destroyed by fire in the South China Sea. Her crew were rescued.
Fanny	United States	The schooner was abandoned in the Atlantic Ocean. Her crew were rescued by Elizabeth and Jane (both United Kingdom).
Seahorse	(United Kingdom of Great Britain and Ireland) Isle of Man	The lugger was driven ashore and sank at Dreswick Point.
Theresa	United Kingdom	The ship was struck by a whirlwind and capsized 6 nautical miles (11 km) off the mouth of the Monkey River. Her crew were rescued.

== 22 June ==
List of shipwrecks: 22 June 1845
Ship	State	Description
Priscilla	United Kingdom	The ship foundered in the Irish Sea off Caldy Island, Pembrokeshire with the loss of all but one of those on board.

== 23 June ==
List of shipwrecks: 23 June 1845
Ship	State	Description
Eveline	United Kingdom	The barque was abandoned in the Atlantic Ocean. All 150 passengers and crew were taken off by Mary (United Kingdom). She foundered the next day. Evelie was on a voyage from Killala, County Louth to Quebec City, Province of Canada, British North America.
Stanislaus	France	The ship departed from Havre de Grâce, Seine Maritime for the Marquesas Islands. No further trace, presumed foundered with the loss of all hands.
Vulcan	United Kingdom	The ship was wrecked on Flinders Island, South Australia.

== 24 June ==
List of shipwrecks: 24 June 1845
Ship	State	Description
Africain	France	The ship was wrecked near Perros, Côtes du Nord. She was on a voyage from Saint Domingo to Havre de Grâce, Seine-Inférieure.
Duke of Bedford	United Kingdom	The ship was driven ashore at Carlisle Point, County Cork. She was refloated.
Koningin Caroline Amelia	Duchy of Holstein	The steamship foundered in the Great Belt. All on board were rescued. She was on a voyage from Nyborg, Denmark to Copenhagen.
Perseverance	United Kingdom	The ship ran aground and was wrecked off Süderoog, Duchy of Holstein. She was on a voyage from Liverpool, Lancashire to Husum, Duchy of Holstein.
Triton	France	The ship was abandoned in the Atlantic Ocean. Her crew were rescued by Bristow (United Kingdom). Triton was on a voyage from St. Jago de Cuba, Cuba to Valparaíso, Chile.

== 25 June ==
List of shipwrecks: 25 June 1845
Ship	State	Description
Herald	United Kingdom	The ship struck rocks off Bermuda and sank.
Philippa	United Kingdom	The ship was driven ashore at Maryport, Cumberland. She was on a voyage from Belfast, County Antrim to Maryport. She was refloated on 19 July and taken in to Maryport.
Rose	United Kingdom	The ship was wrecked on the Chinchorra Shoals either with the loss of nine of her crew, or with nine of her crew being rescued. She was on a voyage from Guadeloupe to Tobasco.

== 26 June ==
List of shipwrecks: 26 June 1845
Ship	State	Description
Falcon	United Kingdom	The ship capsized in the River Thames at the Tower of London. She was later righted.
Ten Brothers	United States	The ship was destroyed by fire in the Atlantic Ocean. Her crew were rescued by Houghly (France).
Triton	United Kingdom	The ship struck rocks off Düne, Heligoland and foundered. Her crew were rescued. She was on a voyage from Liverpool, Lancashire to Wyk auf Föhr, Duchy of Holstein.

== 27 June ==
List of shipwrecks: 27 June 1845
Ship	State	Description
Betsey	United Kingdom	The ship departed from Aberystwyth, Cardiganshire. No further trace, presumed foundered with the loss of all hands.

== 28 June ==
List of shipwrecks: 28 June 1845
Ship	State	Description
Catherine	United Kingdom	The ship was driven ashore 2 nautical miles (3.7 km) east of Dunbar, Lothian. Her crew were rescued. She was on a voyage from Hartlepool, County Durham to Dundee, Forfarshire.
Joseph N. Lord	United States	The pilot boat was lost on the east side of St. Domingo island.
Christian	United Kingdom	The ship was driven ashore at Lindisfarne, Northumberland. She was refloated the next day.
Eleanor	United Kingdom	The schooner ran aground on the Goswick Sand, off the coast of Northumberland. Her crew were rescued. She was on a voyage from Cromarty to Sunderland, County Durham. She was refloated on 8 July and towed in to Berwick upon Tweed, Northumberland.
Ondine	United Kingdom	The schooner was driven ashore and wrecked 5 nautical miles (9.3 km) south of Scarborough, Yorkshire with the loss of all hands.
Superb	(United Kingdom of Great Britain and Ireland) Jersey	The ship was driven ashore and wrecked on Green Island, Blanc-Sablon Bay, British North America.
Sylvanus	(United Kingdom of Great Britain and Ireland) New South Wales	The schooner was wrecked near St Patrick's Head. All on board survived. She was on a voyage from Port Albert to New Town. She was refloated in late October.
Towan	United Kingdom	The ship foundered in the North Sea off Texel, North Holland, Netherlands.Her crew were rescued by Jamaica (United Kingdom). She was on a voyage from Newport, Monmouthshire to Hamburg.

== 29 June ==
List of shipwrecks: 29 June 1845
Ship	State	Description
Experience	United Kingdom	The brig was driven ashore at Cromer, Norfolk.
Joseph	United Kingdom	The brig was driven ashore at Cromer.
Magnet	United Kingdom	The ship was driven ashore at Port Talbot, Glamorgan. She was later refloated.
Pickwick	(United Kingdom of Great Britain and Ireland) New Zealand	The cutter was wrecked off Cape Palliser with the loss of two of her four crew.
Richmond	(United Kingdom of Great Britain and Ireland) New Zealand	The coaster, a schooner, ran aground, capsized and broke in two on the bar of Kawhia Harbour with the loss of all four people on board. She was on a voyage from New Plymouth to Kawhia.
Utile	United Kingdom	The ship was wrecked on the Onegada Shoals, off Tortola.

== 30 June ==
List of shipwrecks: 30 June 1845
Ship	State	Description
Jane	United Kingdom	The ship was driven ashore and wrecked in the Solway Firth. Her crew were rescued. She was on a voyage from Livorno, Grand Duchy of Tuscany to Glasgow, Renfrewshire. She was later refloated and found to be severely damaged.
Sylvanus	(United Kingdom of Great Britain and Ireland) South Australia	The ship was driven ashore on the east coast of Van Diemen's Land.

== Unknown date ==
List of shipwrecks: Unknown date in June 1845
Ship	State	Description
Alcyion	United Kingdom	The ship foundered in the Sea of Azov off Berdianski, Russia.
Dolphin	United Kingdom	The ship foundered in the Baltic Sea. She was on a voyage from Pori, Grand Duchy of Finland to London.
Elbe	United Kingdom	The ship was driven ashore and wrecked in the White Sea. She was on a voyage from Sunderland, County Durham to Onega, Russia.
Finetta	(United Kingdom of Great Britain and Ireland) New Zealand	The cutter was driven ashore and wrecked on Cape Campbell. All hands were saved.
Gazelle	United Kingdom	The ship was driven ashore in the White Sea. She was refloated and put in to Arkhangelsk, Russia, where she arrived on 25 June.
Hypolita	(United Kingdom of Great Britain and Ireland) British North America	The brig was dismasted and abandoned in the Atlantic Ocean before 27 June.
Norden	United Kingdom	The ship ran aground on the wreck of Peru (Prussia) in the Drogden.
Sarah and Ann	United Kingdom	The coble was abandoned in the North Sea before 23 June.
Shamrock	(United Kingdom of Great Britain and Ireland) Van Diemen's Land	The schooner was wrecked in Storm Bay with the loss of all hands. She was on a voyage from Launceston to Hobart.
Tamar	(United Kingdom of Great Britain and Ireland) Van Diemen's Land	The brig was wrecked on the coast of Van Diemen's Land.
