= List of shipwrecks in March 1873 =

The list of shipwrecks in March 1873 includes ships sunk, foundered, grounded, or otherwise lost during March 1873.

== 1 March ==
List of shipwrecks: 1 March 1873
| Ship | State | Description |
|---|---|---|
| Boyne | United Kingdom | The 690-ton iron–hulled barque carrying sugar from Semarang, Netherlands East Indies to Falmouth, Cornwall, sank under Angrouse Cliff near Mullion Cove, Cornwall with the loss of all but four of her nineteen crew. |
| Chacabuco and Torch | United Kingdom | The full-rigged ship Chacabuco collided with the steamship Torch and sank off the Great Orme, Caernarfonshire with the loss of 24 of the 27 people on board. Survivors were rescued by the tug Guiding Star (United Kingdom). Chacabuco was on a voyage from San Francisco, California, United States to Liverpool, Lancashire. Torch was on a voyage from Liverpool to Dublin. She was taken in tow by Guiding Star and the tug Rover (United Kingdom) but sank with the loss of one life. Survivors were rescued by Guiding Star. |
| Jamestown | United States | The full-rigged ship ran aground at Fort Philippe, Belgium. She was on a voyage from Callao, Peru to Antwerp, Belgium. |
| Lady Wharncliffe | United Kingdom | The barque ran aground at the mouth of the Bonny River and was wrecked. Her crew survived. The wreck was plundered by the local inhabitants. |
| Sarah Burnyeat | United Kingdom | The ship was driven ashore in the Isles of Scilly. She was on a voyage from Madras, India to London. She was refloated. |
| Star of the Sea | United Kingdom | The barque was wrecked off Holyhead, Anglesey. |
| Venus | United Kingdom | The ship was driven ashore and sank. Her crew survived. She was on a voyage from Queenstown, County Cork to Yokohama, Japan. |
| Vorwarts | Germany | The galiot collided with the fishing smack Laurel (United Kingdom) and foundered in the Dogger Bank with the loss of four of her five crew. The survivor was rescued by Laurel. Vorwarts was on a voyage from Cuxhaven to Leith, Lothian, United Kingdom. |
| Unnamed | United Kingdom | A schooner sank off Liverpool, Lancashire. |

== 2 March ==
List of shipwrecks: 2 March 1873
| Ship | State | Description |
|---|---|---|
| Clara Manning | United Kingdom | The schooner was driven ashore at Bilbao, Spain. |
| Crystal Spring | United Kingdom | The skiff was wrecked in Bideford Bay with the loss of all three crew. |
| Juno | United Kingdom | The schooner ran aground off Caldey Island, Pembrokeshire. She was on a voyage from Plymouth, Devon to Llanelly, Glamorgan. She was refloated with assistance from the steamship Llanelly (United Kingdom) and taken in to Tenby, Pembrokeshire. |
| Robert C. Winthrop | United States | The ship was abandoned in the Atlantic Ocean. Her crew were rescued by Amanda (Germany). Robert C. Winthrop was on a voyage from New York to Antwerp, Belgium. |
| Victorious | United Kingdom | The schooner was wrecked on the Mosquito Coast with the loss of three of her crew. |

== 3 March ==
List of shipwrecks: 3 March 1873
| Ship | State | Description |
|---|---|---|
| Alma | United Kingdom | The schooner was driven ashore and wrecked at Perranporth, Cornwall. Her crew were rescued. She was on a voyage from Kinsale, County Cork to Portsmouth, Hampshire. |
| Clara P. Gibbs | United Kingdom | The ship was driven ashore and wrecked at Alloa, Clackmannanshire. |
| Formalhaut | Germany | The barque ran aground and was abandoned at Pentreath, Cornwall. She was on a voyage from Mersin, Ottoman Empire to Falmouth, Cornwall. She was refloated and taken in to Penzance, Cornwall with the assistance of the Cadgwith and Lizard Lifeboats. |
| Georgina | United Kingdom | The ship was driven ashore on Lambay Island, County Dublin. She was on a voyage from Nefyn, Caernarfonshire to Dublin. |
| Jane Morgan | United Kingdom | The ship sprang a leak and sank at Fishguard, Pembrokeshire. She was on a voyage from Swansea, Glamorgan to Newry, County Antrim. |
| Jeune Edouard | France | The ship was driven ashore and wrecked on the coast of Brazil. Her crew were rescued. She was on a voyage from Le Havre, Seine-Inférieure to the Rio Grande. |
| John and George | United Kingdom | The ship collided with Red Rover (United Kingdom) and foundered in the Bristol Channel. John and George was on a voyage from Bridgwater, Somerset to Newport, Monmouthshire. |
| Lalla Rookh | United Kingdom | The square-rigged, iron-hulled tea clipper of 869 tons, was wrecked off Prawle Point in Devon with the loss of a crew member. Survivors were rescued by rocket apparatus. Her remains still lie under the beach at Elender Cove, while her figurehead was found in Jersey in 1939 and is now preserved at the Cutty Sark museum ship. |
| Lees | United Kingdom | The schooner foundered 3 nautical miles (5.6 km) off Ouessant, Finistère, France, according to a message in a bottle washed up at Porthminster, Cornwall on 14 April. |
| Madeleine | United Kingdom | The brig was driven ashore at San Sebastián, Spain. She was on a voyage from Swansea to Bilbao, Spain. |
| Moderation | United Kingdom | The barque ran aground in the Dardanelles. She was on a voyage from South Shields, County Durham to Constantinople, Ottoman Empire. She was refloated with the assistance of tugs. |
| Odysseus | Greece | The barque was driven ashore and wrecked on Pwll Du Point, Glamorgan. Her crew were rescued. She was on a voyage from Dublin to Swansea. |
| Quail | United Kingdom | The steamship was driven ashore at Atherfield Point, Isle of Wight. Her 22 crew survived; seven were rescued by the Brighstone Grange Lifeboat Rescue ( Royal National Lifeboat Institution) and fifteen reached Freshwater in a boat. Quail was on a voyage from Liverpool, Lancashire to Rotterdam, South Holland, Netherlands. She was refloated on 6 March with assistance from the tugs Aid, Fawn and Robin Hood (all United Kingdom) and towed in to Southampton, Hampshire. |
| Star of the Sea | United Kingdom | The ship was driven ashore at Holyhead, Anglesey. Her crew were rescued by rocket apparatus. She was on a voyage from Liverpool to an African port. |
| Tarano | France | The ship was run ashore at La Tremblade, Charente-Inférieure. Her crew were rescued. |
| Victress | British Honduras | The schooner foundered in a whirlwind off the Mosquito Coast. She was on a voyage from Belize City to Bluefields, Nicaragua. |

== 4 March ==
List of shipwrecks: 4 March 1873
| Ship | State | Description |
|---|---|---|
| Endeavour | United Kingdom | The ship was driven ashore and severely damaged at Port Gaverne, Cornwall. She was on a voyage from Newport, Monmouthshire to Padstow, Cornwall. |
| James | United Kingdom | The schooner was driven ashore at Donaghadee, County Down. She was on a voyage from Dublin to Troon, Ayrshire. She was refloated and found to be leaky. |
| James Ewing | United Kingdom | The ship was driven ashore and wrecked at Cape Cornwall, Cornwall with the loss of two of her five crew. Two of the survivors were rescued by rocket apparatus, the third swam ashore. She was on a voyage from Harrington, Cumberland to Rotterdam, South Holland, Netherlands. |
| May | United Kingdom | The schooner sank off the North Foreland, Kent. Her crew were rescued. She was on a voyage from Newport to Plymouth, Devon. |
| Odiseas | Greece | The barque was driven ashore and wrecked at "Pwlldy", Glamorgan, United Kingdom. Her crew were rescued. |

== 5 March ==
List of shipwrecks: 5 March 1873
| Ship | State | Description |
|---|---|---|
| Binn | United Kingdom | The smack driven ashore and wrecked at Castlehill. Her crew were rescued. She was on a voyage from Castlehill to Portsoy, Aberdeenshire. |
| Shelburne | United Kingdom | The steamship ran ashore on Walney Island, Lancashire. Her passengers were taken off. |
| Thomas | United Kingdom | The schooner foundered off Dunbar, Lothian. Her crew were rescued. |

== 6 March ==
List of shipwrecks: 6 March 1873
| Ship | State | Description |
|---|---|---|
| Clementina | Portugal | The barque ran aground on Perycana and sank. Six people were rescued. She was on a voyage from Pará to Maranhão, Brazil. |
| Gabrielle | Germany | The brig ran aground in the Zuyder Zee off Amsterdam, North Holland, Netherlands and was wrecked. Her crew were rescued. She was on a voyage from a port in Uruguay to Hamburg. |
| Harriet | United Kingdom | The sloop was wrecked at Porto, Portugal. Her crew were rescued by rocket apparatus. She was on a voyage from the Newfoundland Colony to Porto. |
| Olga | United Kingdom | The ship ran aground off Gibraltar. She was refloated on 9 March. |
| Unnamed | Netherlands | A Dutch ship was wrecked at Bude, Cornwall, United Kingdom. Her five crew were rescued by the Bude Lifeboat. |

== 7 March ==
List of shipwrecks: 7 March 1873
| Ship | State | Description |
|---|---|---|
| Dollart | Germany | The schooner got into difficulties off Cemaes Head, Pembrokeshire, United Kingdom. Her seven crew were rescued by the Cardigan Lifeboat John Stuart ( Royal National Lifeboat Institution). |
| Josephine | United Kingdom | The barque was wrecked at Dungeness, Kent. Her thirteen crew were rescued by the cutter Star (United Kingdom). Josephine was on a voyage from Singapore, Straits Settlements to London. |
| Saint Petersburg | United Kingdom | The steamship ran aground and was wrecked at St. George's, Bermuda. She was on a voyage from Amoy, China to New York. She was refloated in June 1873 and taken in to New York. |

== 8 March ==
List of shipwrecks: 8 March 1873
| Ship | State | Description |
|---|---|---|
| Battasara | Norway | The barque foundered in the North Sea with the loss of all but two of her crew. She was on a voyage from Newcastle upon Tyne, Northumberland, United Kingdom to Copenhagen, Denmark. |
| Clanranald | United Kingdom | The brig was wrecked at Gibraltar. Her eight crew were rescued by the brig Express (Russia). Clanranald was on a voyage from Swansea, Glamorgan to Carloforte, Sardinia, Italy. |
| Gabrielle | Italy | The brig was wrecked at Amsterdam, North Holland, Netherlands. She was on a voyage from a port in Uruguay to Hamburg, Germany. |

== 9 March ==
List of shipwrecks: 9 March 1873
| Ship | State | Description |
|---|---|---|
| Crane | United Kingdom | The smack sprang a leak and sank in the Menai Strait. Her crew were rescued. She was on a voyage from Bangor, Caernarfonshire to Chester, Cheshire. |
| Johannes | Germany | The schooner was wrecked on the English Bank, in the River Plate. She was on a voyage from Porto Alegre, Brazil to Rio de Janeiro, Argentina. |
| Trevelyan | United Kingdom | The ship ran aground on the Pedro Shoals, in the Indian Ocean. She was on a voyage from Madras, India to Demerara, British Guiana. She was refloated and resumed her voyage. |
| Vildosala | United Kingdom | The steamship was wrecked at Porto, Portugal. Her crew were rescued. She was on a voyage from Glasgow, Renfrewshire to Porto. |

== 10 March ==
List of shipwrecks: 10 March 1873
| Ship | State | Description |
|---|---|---|
| Abeona | United Kingdom | The brigantine ran aground and sank in Jack Sound. She was on a voyage from Liverpool, Lancashire to Plymouth, Devon. |
| Brenda | United Kingdom | The steamship ran aground at Pauillac, Gironde and was severely damaged. She was on a voyage from Bordeaux, Gironde to London. She was refloated and put back to Bordeaux in a leaky condition. |
| Dilharree | United Kingdom | The full-rigged ship ran aground in the Southwest Pass, Mississippi River Delta, United States, blocking the channel. She was refloated undamaged on 19 March with the assistance of nine tugs and resumed her voyage from New Orleans to Liverpool. |
| Olga | Greece | The brig ran aground and sank at Milford Haven, Pembrokeshire, United Kingdom. |
| Olvar | Norway | The ship was wrecked off "Udoe" with the loss of two of her crew. She was on a voyage from Dysart, Fife, United Kingdom to Christania. |
| Undine | Norway | The barque was driven ashore on the coast of Cuba. Her crew were rescued. She was on a voyage from London to Pensacola, Florida. |
| Zadkiel | United Kingdom | The ship departed from Tome, Japan for Liverpool. No further trace, presumed foundered with the loss of all hands. |
| Unnamed | Flag unknown | A brig ran aground on the Knock John sandbank, off the coast of Kent, United Kingdom. |

== 11 March ==
List of shipwrecks: 11 March 1873
| Ship | State | Description |
|---|---|---|
| Elise | United Kingdom | The ship was wrecked at Santander, Spain. Her crew were rescued. She was on a voyage from Passage West, County Cork to Santander. |
| "Garibaldi" | United States | The boat was lost in Ipswich Bay. Crew saved. |
| Ida E. | United States | The ship was driven ashore at Coney Island, New York City. She was on a voyage from Matanzas, Cuba to New York City. |

== 12 March ==
List of shipwrecks: 12 March 1873
| Ship | State | Description |
|---|---|---|
| John McDonald | Canada | The brig foundered 10 nautical miles (19 km) west of "Martin's Head". Her crew were rescued. She was on a voyage from Hillsborough, New Brunswick to New York, United States. |

== 13 March ==
List of shipwrecks: 13 March 1873
| Ship | State | Description |
|---|---|---|
| Anna Krell | Germany | The barque was abandoned in the Indian Ocean. Her crew were rescued by Clodian (United Kingdom). Anna Krell was on a voyage from Probolinggo, Netherlands East Indies to Lisbon, Portugal. |
| Ruby | United Kingdom | The barque ran aground on the Haisborough Sands, in the North Sea off the coast of Norfolk with some loss of life. Nine of her crew were rescued. She was on a voyage from Sunderland, County Durham, to Odesa, Russia. |

== 14 March ==
List of shipwrecks: 14 March 1873
| Ship | State | Description |
|---|---|---|
| Criminal Ruth Brandt | Germany | The ship ran aground on the Hittarp Reef, in the Baltic Sea. She was on a voyage from Memel to London, United Kingdom. |
| Marianne | France | The chasse-marée struck a rock off Port-Louis, Morbihan and was run ashore near "Toulard". She was on a voyage from Nantes, Loire-Inférieure to Plymouth, Devon, United Kingdom. She was refloated on 18 March and towed in to L'Orient, Morbihan. |
| Ulcoats | United Kingdom | The ship was sighted in the Atlantic Ocean whilst on a voyage from South Shields, County Durham to Callao, Peru. No further trace, presumed foundered with the loss of all hands. |

== 15 March ==
List of shipwrecks: 15 March 1873
| Ship | State | Description |
|---|---|---|
| Abyssinia | United Kingdom | The steamship ran aground at Rangoon, Burma. She was on a voyage from Moulmein to Rangoon. She was refloated and taken in to Rangoon. |
| Alice Jane | United Kingdom | The ship was abandoned in the English Channel off Portland, Dorset. Her crew were rescued by Venerable (United Kingdom). |
| Clementine Aimée | France | The ship collided with the smack Shamrock (United Kingdom) and sank. Clementine Aimée was on a voyage from Briton Ferry, Glamorgan, United Kingdom to La Rochelle, Charente-Inférieure. |
| Hirundo | United Kingdom | The ship departed from Dunkirk, Nord for London. No further trace, presumed foundered with the loss of all hands. |
| J. W. | United Kingdom | The barque was wrecked near Colonia del Sacramento, Uruguay. She was on a voyage from a port in California to Pensacola, Florida, United States. |
| Lena | United Kingdom | The ship was driven ashore in Tor Bay. Her crew were rescued by rocket apparatus. She was on a voyage from Rangoon to London. |

== 16 March ==
List of shipwrecks: 16 March 1873
| Ship | State | Description |
|---|---|---|
| Aberdeenshire | United Kingdom | The steamship ran aground on the Stoney Binks, in the North Sea off the mouth of the Humber. She was consequently beached on the Trinity Sand, off the coast o Lincolnshire with the loss of three lives. Survivors were rescued by the Grimsby Lifeboat. She was on a voyage from Rotterdam, South Holland, Netherlands to Hull, Yorkshire She was later refloated and towed in the Hull in a leaky condition. |
| Caduceus | United Kingdom | The ship was driven ashore on Sapelo Island, Georgia. She was on a voyage from London to Sapelo Island. |
| Dunbar Castle | United Kingdom | The schooner ran aground and was scuttled at Ryde, Isle of Wight. |
| Jeune Jacob | France | The ship was wrecked near Marennes, Charente-Inférieure. |
| Triumph | United Kingdom | The schooner foundered 50 nautical miles (93 km) off Truro, Cornwall. Her crew were rescued by a steamship. She was on a voyage from . |

== 17 March ==
List of shipwrecks: 17 March 1873
| Ship | State | Description |
|---|---|---|
| Batavia | Germany | The barque was driven ashore at Dungeness, Kent, United Kingdom. She was on a voyage from Hamburg to Buenos Aires, Argentina. |
| Bordelais | United Kingdom | The barque was wrecked on the Barrow Sand, in the North Sea off the coast of Essex. Her crew were rescued. She was on a voyage from Hamburg, Germany to Swansea, Glamorgan. |
| Branch | United Kingdom | The schooner ran aground at Upper Achintore, Inverness-shire. She was on a voyage from Runcorn, Cheshire to Dundee, Forfarshire. |
| Cameo | United Kingdom | The barque was driven ashore and wrecked at Motril, Spain. Her crew were rescued. She was on a voyage from Newcastle upon Tyne, Northumberland to Motril. |
| Elizabeth Henderson | United Kingdom | The ship was wrecked off Paranagua, Brazil. Her crew were rescued. |
| King of the Belgians | United Kingdom | The steamship was driven ashore at Zwartenpolder-Valkenissi, Zeeland, Netherlands. She was on a voyage from Liverpool, Lancashire to Antwerp, Belgium. |
| Lothair | United Kingdom | The steamship was driven ashore at Courtown, County Wexford. Her crew were rescued. She was on a voyage from Greenock, Renfrewshire to Poole, Dorset. |
| Sea Gull | United Kingdom | The steamship struck the quayside at West Hartlepool, County Durham and was severely damaged. She was on a voyage from Sunderland to West Hartlepool. |

== 18 March ==
List of shipwrecks: 18 March 1873
| Ship | State | Description |
|---|---|---|
| Celine | France | The schooner ran aground on the Holm Sand, in the North Sea off the coast of Suffolk, United Kingdom with the loss of her captain. Seven survivors were rescued by the Lowestoft Lifeboat. She was on a voyage from Gravelines, Nord to Gothenburg, Sweden. |
| Donald | United Kingdom | The Mersey Flat collided with the steamship Elena (Spain) and sank in the River Mersey. |
| Jane | United Kingdom | The ship was driven ashore at Padstow, Cornwall. She was refloated and found to be severely leaky. |
| Katie | United Kingdom | The schooner sprang a leak and was abandoned off Land's End, Cornwall. Her crew were rescued by another schooner. Katie was on a voyage from Cardiff, Glamorgan to Penzance, Cornwall. |
| Magdeburg | United Kingdom | The steamship was driven ashore near Brouwershaven, Zeeland, Netherlands. |
| Redby | United Kingdom | The ship ran aground on the Shipwash Sand, in the North Sea off the coast of Suffolk. She was on a voyage from Sunderland, County Durham, to London. She was refloated and taken in to Harwich, Essex, where she was beached, being severely leaky. |

== 19 March ==
List of shipwrecks: 19 March 1873
| Ship | State | Description |
|---|---|---|
| Demetrius | United Kingdom | The brig was wrecked on the Longsand, in the North Sea off the coast of Essex. Seven of her ten crew reached shore in the longboat; the others got aboard the Tongue Lightship ( Royal National Lifeboat Institution), from where they were rescued by the Margate Lifeboat. Demetrius was on a voyage from Grimsby, Lincolnshire to Alexandria, Egypt. |
| Goshen | United Kingdom | The brig foundered in the Mediterranean Sea 70 nautical miles (130 km) south east of Mahón, Mallorca, Spain. Her ten crew were rescued by Alaska (United States). Goshen was on a voyage from Saint Jean d'Acre, Ottoman Syria to Falmouth, Cornwall. |
| Mero | Belgium | The fishing smack sprang a leak and foundered in the North Sea 65 nautical miles (120 km) off Lowestoft, Suffolk, United Kingdom. Her crew were rescued by the lugger Young William (United Kingdom. |
| Penelope | Sweden | The barque ran aground at St Andrews, Fife, United Kingdom. She was on a voyage from "Saltkallan" to St Andrews. |

== 20 March ==
List of shipwrecks: 20 March 1873
| Ship | State | Description |
|---|---|---|
| Adriana Francisca | Netherlands | The ship sprang a leak and was abandoned in the North Sea. Her crew were rescued. She was on a voyage from Blyth, Northumberland, United Kingdom to Vlissingen, Zeeland. |
| Noordster | Norway | The barque was wrecked on the Long Sand, in the North Sea off the coast of Essex, United Kingdom. Herfourtee crew were rescued by the Margate Lifeboat. She floated off and was towed in to Margate, Kent, United Kingdom. |

== 21 March ==
List of shipwrecks: 21 March 1873
| Ship | State | Description |
|---|---|---|
| Brooking | United Kingdom | The brig was wrecked at Nizao, Domican Republic. She was on a voyage from Alta Vela Island to Milford Haven, Pembrokeshire. |
| Florence Baker | Canada | The barque foundered in the Atlantic Ocean 65 nautical miles (120 km) off Cape Clear Island, County Cork, United Kingdom. Her crew were rescued by the brig Selsker (United Kingdom). Florence Baker was on a voyage from Port Talbot, Glamorgan, United Kingdom to Galveston, Texas, United States. |
| Provident | United Kingdom | The smack collided with the steamship Blanche (United Kingdom) and sank. Her crew were rescued. She was on a voyage from Aberthaw, Glamorgan to Glasgow, Renfrewshire. |

== 22 March ==
List of shipwrecks: 22 March 1873
| Ship | State | Description |
|---|---|---|
| Luise Hortense | France | The schooner was wrecked near Cherbourg, Manche with the loss of all hands. |
| Perle | Germany | The ship ran aground on the English Bank, in the River Plate and was wrecked. She was on a voyage from Hamburg to Buenos Aires, Argentina. |

== 23 March ==
List of shipwrecks: 23 March 1873
| Ship | State | Description |
|---|---|---|
| Adolphe Marie | United Kingdom | The ship struck a sunken rock. She was on a voyage from Nantes, Loire-Inférieure to a British port. She consequently put in to Audierne, Finistère in a leaky condition. |
| Bernice | United Kingdom | The ship was destroyed by fire at sea. Her crew were rescued by Ocean Belle (United Kingdom). Bernice was on a voyage from South Shields, County Durham to Bombay, India. |
| Casti | United Kingdom | The ship was driven ashore in the Gironde. She was on a voyage from Mauritius to Bordeaux, Gironde. She was refloated and completed her voyage. |
| Golconda | United Kingdom | The barque ran aground at Nagara Point, in the Dardanelles. She was on a voyage from Sulina, Ottoman Empire to Falmouth, Cornwall. |
| Polydore | France | The brig ran aground at La Atunara. She was on a voyage from Marseille, Bouches-du-Rhône to Le Havre, Seine-Inférieure. She was refloated with the assistance of the tug Lion Belge ( (United Kingdom of Great Britain and Ireland) Gibraltar and towed in to Gibraltar. |

== 24 March ==
List of shipwrecks: 24 March 1873
| Ship | State | Description |
|---|---|---|
| Cheviot | United Kingdom | The steamship was driven ashore and wrecked "on the Foreland of North Devon". Her crew were rescued. |
| Jacmel | United Kingdom | The schooner was driven ashore at La Atunara, Spain. She was on a voyage from Marseille, Bouches-du-Rhône to Le Havre, Seine-Inférieure. She was refloated on 26 March. |
| Polydore | France | The barque was driven ashore at La Atunara. She was on a voyage from Marseille to Rouen, Seine-Inférieure. |

== 25 March ==
List of shipwrecks: 25 March 1873
| Ship | State | Description |
|---|---|---|
| Maria | Greece | The brig was driven ashore and wrecked on the Hoggs, County Kerry, United Kingdom. She was on a voyage from New York, United States to Limerick, United Kingdom. |
| Maria Esther | France | The ship collided with the fishing vessel Recours à Marie (France) and foundered off the Baleines Lighthouse, Île de Ré, Charente-Inférieure. |

== 26 March ==
List of shipwrecks: 26 March 1873
| Ship | State | Description |
|---|---|---|
| Almatin | Canada | The ship was wrecked in the Plumper Pass. She was on a voyage from the Burrard Inlet to Melbourne, Victoria. |
| Blue Jacket | United Kingdom | The schooner sank in the Platters, off the coast of Anglesey. Her crew were rescued. She was on a voyage from Plymouth, Devon to Fleetwood, Lancashire. |
| Gambie | France | The steamship was wrecked at Cape Itapuan, Brazil. All on board were rescued by the steamship Rio Vermelho (Brazil). Gambie was on a voyage from Rio de Janeiro, Brazil to Marseille, Bouches-du-Rhône. |
| Grietje V. Bolhaus | Netherlands | The ship was wrecked at Santo Domingo Tonalá, Mexico. |
| Inkerman | United Kingdom | The ship was abandoned on fire in the Atlantic Ocean. Her crew survived. She was on a voyage from Calcutta, India to Dundee, Forfarshire. |
| James Hall | United States | The ship was driven ashore at Cape Henlopen, Delaware. She was on a voyage from Palermo, Sicily, Italy to Boston, Massachusetts. |
| Jenny Armstrong | United Kingdom | The barque was driven ashore in Whiting Bay. She was on a voyage from Liverpool, Lancashire to Ardrossan, Ayrshire. She was refloated on 30 March and assisted in to Ardrossan. |
| William McGowan | United Kingdom | The brig was driven ashore on Craigleith, Lothian. She was on a voyage from Burntisland, Fife to London. She was refloated and put in to Leith, Lothian in a leaky condition and was placed under repair. |

== 27 March ==
List of shipwrecks: 27 March 1873
| Ship | State | Description |
|---|---|---|
| Bundaleer | United Kingdom | The ship ran aground in the River Thames at Blackwall, Middlesex. She was on a voyage from London to Adelaide, South Australia. She was refloated on 30 March. |
| Chrysolite | United Kingdom | The steamship foundered in the Firth of Clyde off Sanda Island. Her crew were rescued. |
| Cottager | United Kingdom | The smack was driven ashore at Battery Point, Renfrewshire. |
| Fair Maid | United Kingdom | The schooner was driven ashore at Montrose, Forfarshire. |
| Fido | United Kingdom | The steamship was driven ashore at Kaseborg, Germany. She was on a voyage from Hull, Yorkshire to Stettin, Germany. |
| Great Western | United Kingdom | The steamship was driven ashore near "Blackmore", Somerset. She was on a voyage from Bristol, Gloucestershire to New York, United States. |
| India | Italy | The steamship ran aground in the Suez Canal. She was refloated the next day and resumed her voyage. |
| Mary Lawton | Canada | The barque was driven ashore on Rathlin Island, County Donegal, United Kingdom. She was on a voyage from Ardrossan, Ayrshire, United Kingdom to Boston, Massachusetts, United States |
| Minuet | United Kingdom | The tug was driven ashore at Great Yarmouth, Norfolk. |
| Missouri | United States | The steamship ran aground in the Southwest Pass. |
| Regina Cœli | France | The schooner was run down and sunk off Cape de Gatt, Spain by the steamship Westoe (United Kingdom). Her crew were rescued by Westoe. Regina Cœli was on a voyage from Phillippeville, Algeria to Dunkirk, Nord. |
| Sylphide | United Kingdom | The ketch struck a rock and sank at Fowey, Cornwall. She was on a voyage from Fowey to Dublin. |
| Victoire | France | The barque was driven ashore at Ballyquinton, County Down, United Kingdom. She was on a voyage from British Honduras to the Clyde. She was refloated and taken in to the Belfast Lough in a leaky condition. |
| Unnamed | Flag unknown | A brigantine foundered off Paimpol, Côtes-du-Nord, France. |
| Unnamed | France | A schooner was driven ashore near Pontrieux, Côtes-du-Nord. She was refloated and taken in to the Île-de-Bréhat in a leaky condition. |

== 28 March ==
List of shipwrecks: 28 March 1873
| Ship | State | Description |
|---|---|---|
| Eliza | United Kingdom | The brigantine was run down and sunk in the Bristol Channel off Lundy Island Devon by the steamship Sir Bevis (United Kingdom) with the loss of four of her crew. Survivors were rescued by Sir Bevis. |
| Princess Dagmar | United Kingdom | The full-rigged ship sprang a leak, caught fire and was abandoned at sea. Her crew survived. She was on a voyage from Calcutta, India to Barrow-in-Furness, Lancashire. |
| Rosa Bonheur | Flag unknown | The full-rigged ship collided with the barque Antonio Angelo (Flag unknown) and ran aground at Rangoon, Burma. She was refloated. |
| Saint Pierre | France | The fishing smack was driven ashore at South Shields, County Durham, United Kingdom. She was on a voyage from North Shields, Northumberland, United Kingdom to Iceland. She was refloated. |

== 29 March ==
List of shipwrecks: 29 March 1873
| Ship | State | Description |
|---|---|---|
| Median | United Kingdom | The steamship was driven ashore at Ryde, Isle of Wight. She was on a voyage from Portsmouth to Southampton, Hampshire. |
| North Star | United Kingdom | The schooner was run down and sunk off Cromer, Norfolk by the steamship Finchale (United Kingdom). Her four crew were rescued by Finchale. North Star was on a voyage from Lowestoft, Suffolk to Seaham, County Durham. |
| Prince Baudouin | Belgium | The steamship was driven ashore near Folkestone, Kent, United Kingdom. |
| Silver Spray | United States | The ship foundered off Santo António, Portugal. |
| Snipe | United Kingdom | The ship was wrecked in Kyleakin Sound. Her crew were rescued. She was on a voyage from Liverpool, Lancashire to Tayport, Fife. |
| Sree Singapura | United Kingdom | The ship collided with Benmore United Kingdom) and sank in the English Channel 20 nautical miles (37 km) north east of Les Casquets, Channel Islands. Her crew were rescued by Benmore. Sree Singapura was on a voyage from Bassein, India to London. |

== 30 March ==
List of shipwrecks: 30 March 1873
| Ship | State | Description |
|---|---|---|
| Clorinde Adema | France | The ship sank at Saint-Armel, Morbihan. |
| Eliza | United Kingdom | The brig collided with the steamship Sir Bevis (United Kingdom) and sank in the Bristol Channel off Lundy Island, Devon with the loss of four of her crew. |
| Inchkeith | United Kingdom | The steamship was driven ashore and wrecked at Burnmouth, Berwickshire. Her crew survived. She was on a voyage from Middlesbrough, Yorkshire to Grangemouth, Stirlingshire. |
| Madras | United Kingdom | The ship was driven ashore on Rathlin Island, County Antrim. She was on a voyage from Port Glasgow, Renfrewshire to Quebec City, Canada. She was refloated on 2 April and put back to Port Glasgow |
| Ranger | United Kingdom | The steamship was driven ashore and severely damaged at Cullercoats, Northumberland. She was on a voyage from Middlesbrough to a Scottish port. |
| Rosa | United Kingdom | The schooner sprang a leak and sank in the River Liffey at Dublin. Her five crew survived. |

== 31 March ==
List of shipwrecks: 31 March 1873
| Ship | State | Description |
|---|---|---|
| Asturias, and Nor | Spain; France | The steamship Asturias collided with Nor off Gibraltar and was beached. She was on a voyage from Cádiz to Málaga. Nor was severely damaged. She was on a voyage from Alexandria, Egypt to Dunkirk, Nord. |
| Awthorn | United States | The ship was driven ashore and wrecked at "Silan". She was on a voyage from Navassa Island to New York. |
| Englebert | Germany | The barque collided with the barque Svea (Norway) at Queenstown, County Cork, United Kingdom and was beached. Englebert was on a voyage from San Francisco, California, United States to Queenstown. She was refloated on 18 April and towed in to Queenstown. |
| Gem | United Kingdom | The schooner collided with the barque Equinox (United Kingdom) and sank in the Mediterranean Sea 12 nautical miles (22 km) off the Calaburras Lighthouse, Spain. Her crew were rescued. Gem was on a voyage from Cardiff, Glamorgan to Cartagena, Spain. |
| Seamew | United Kingdom | The barque caught fire off Shanghai, China. She put back to Shanghai and the fire was extinguished. |
| Ugo | Austria-Hungary | The ship ran aground and sank at Staten Island, New York. She was on a voyage from London, United Kingdom to New York. |

== Unknown date ==
List of shipwrecks: Unknown date in March 1873
| Ship | State | Description |
|---|---|---|
| Albatros | France | The ship was wrecked near "Carrepon" with the loss of a crew member. |
| Alert | United Kingdom | The fishing smack collided with Fairy Queen and sank off the coast of Essex. Her crew were rescued. |
| Amalie | France | The ship was abandoned at sea. |
| Amelina | France | The schooner was driven ashore and severely damaged. She was on a voyage from Pontrieux, Côtes du Nord to Bristol, Gloucestershire, United Kingdom. She was refloated and put back to Pontrieux. |
| Amor Fraterno | Flag unknown | The ship was abandoned in the Atlantic Ocean before 10 March. Her crew were rescued by Norma (United States). |
| Anna | Italy | The ship was abandoned in the Atlantic Ocean 50 nautical miles (93 km) off Bermuda. Her twelve crew were rescued by Cheviot (United Kingdom). |
| Anna Gezina | Netherlands | The galiot was driven ashore and wrecked at Bude, Cornwall, United Kingdom. Her three crew were rescued by the Bude Lifeboat. |
| Antares | United Kingdom | The ship collided with Augusta (United Kingdom) and sank off Trinidad. Her crew were rescued by Augusta. |
| Bina | United Kingdom | The barque was wrecked at Plumb Point, Jamaica. She was on a voyage from Saint Thomas, Virgin Islands to Jamaica. |
| Bonjour | France | The ship was driven ashore at the Packerort Lighthouse, Russia. She was on a voyage from Catania, Sicily, Italy to Kronstadt, Russia. She was refloated and taken in to Baltic Port, Russia. |
| Cecilie | United Kingdom | The ship was driven ashore at Sæby, Denmark. She was on a voyage from Ipswich, Suffolk to Aalborg, Denmark. She was refloated and taken in to Fredrikshavn, Denmark. |
| Charlotte | United States | The ship was wrecked on Bermuda before 18 March. She was on a voyage from Livorno, Italy to Boston, Massachusetts. |
| Coquette | New Zealand | The yacht left Peraki Bay on Banks Peninsula with three people on board on 22 March and was last seen later the same evening west of the mouth of Akaroa Harbour. It is thought she succumbed to damage caused by hitting a rock a week earlier which had not been fully repaired. |
| C. S. Rogers | United Kingdom | The ship was abandoned in the Atlantic Ocean. Her crew were rescued. She was on a voyage from Saint John, New Brunswick, Canada to Havana, Cuba. |
| Dan | United Kingdom | The ship was wrecked at Sines, Portugal. |
| Duffryn | United Kingdom | The steamship foundered in the Baltic Sea. Her crew survived; six were rescued from a raft by a Royal Navy ship. She was on a voyage from Cardiff, Glamorgan to Riga, Russia. |
| Emily | United Kingdom | The ship was driven ashore near Le Havre, Seine-Inférieure, France. She was on a voyage from London to Rouen, Seine-Inférieure. She was later refloated and completed her voyage. |
| Europa | France | The ship was destroyed by fire at sea. She was on a voyage from New Orleans, Louisiana, to Le Havre. |
| Franz Schubert | Germany | The ship foundered in the Indian Ocean. Her crew were rescued by Nautaise ( Haiti. Franz Schubert was on a voyage from the River Tyne to Bombay, India. |
| Fuchs | Germany | The ship was abandoned at sea before 29 March. |
| Gazelle | Canada | The ship was abandoned at sea with the loss of all but two of her crew. The survivors were rescued by Cheviot (United Kingdom). Gazelle was on a voyage from New York to "Corunná" . |
| Gettysburg | United States | The ship was driven ashore. She was on a voyage from New Orleans to Le Havre. She was refloated and taken in to Key West, Florida. |
| Horseguards | United Kingdom | The steamship ran aground at Philadelphia, Pennsylvania, United States. She was on a voyage from Liverpool to Philadelphia . |
| International | United Kingdom | The steamship was driven ashore at Dover, Kent. She was refloated and resumed her voyage. |
| Jennie Eastman | United States | The ship was wrecked before 17 March. Her crew were rescued. She was on a voyage from Le Havre to New Orleans, Louisiana. |
| Jens Sassen | Flag unknown | The ship was driven ashore at Indian River, United States. She was on a voyage from London to Philadelphia. |
| J. H. Orne | United States | The fishing schooner sank in a storm on the Georges Bank. Lost with all 11 crew. |
| Josephine | United States | The ship was wrecked. sHe was on a voyage from Buenos Aires, Argentina to Boston, Massachusetts. |
| Kate Bingham | United States | The ship was abandoned in the Atlantic Ocean before 26 March. Her crew were reported missing. She was on a voyage from New York to Le Havre. |
| Legistlature | United States | The steamship ran aground in the Southwest Pass between 10 and 19 March. She was still aground on 27 March. |
| Magna Charta | United Kingdom | The ship foundered in the Bay of Biscay before 3 March. Her crew were rescued by the steamship Bonita (Brazil). Magna Charta was on a voyage from Newcastle upon Tyne, Northumberland to Santos, Brazil. |
| Newbiggin | United Kingdom | The steamship ran aground at Malta. She was refloated on 16 March. |
| No. 2 | France) | The dredger was run into by the steamship Jubilee (United Kingdom) and sank at Le Havre, France. |
| Perseverance | United Kingdom | The ship was driven ashore near Trouville-sur-Mer, Calvados, France. She was refloated and taken in to Trouville-sur-Mer. |
| Scud | (Dominion of Newfoundland) Newfoundland Colony | The ship was wrecked on the Atwood Cays. She was on a voyage from Saint John's to Cárdenas, Cuba. |
| Siam | United Kingdom | The ship was abandoned and foundered at sea before 4 March. She was on a voyage from Portland, Oregon, United States to London. |
| Sir Hugh Rose | United Kingdom | The ship was driven ashore. She was on a voyage from Calcutta, India to Jeddah, Hejaz Vilayet. |
| Skitty Belle | United Kingdom | The sloop collided with St. Mary (United Kingdom) and foundered with the loss of all but one of her crew. |
| Trafik | Flag unknown | The steamship ran aground on the Lillegrund. She was on a voyage from Bergen, Norway to Stockholm, Sweden. She was refloated and taken in to Copenhagen, Denmark. |
| Vrede | Netherlands | The ship was wrecked near Tobasco, Mexico. Her crew were rescued. She was on a voyage from Veracruz to Tobasco. |
| Wave | United Kingdom | The schooner was wrecked. Her crew were rescued. She was on a voyage from Liverpool, Lancashire to Plymouth, Devon. |
| Wilmington | United States | The steamship was driven ashore. She was on a voyage from New York to Havana. She was refloated and completed her voyage in a severely leaky condition. |
