= Marbella Lighthouse =

Lighthouse in southern Spain

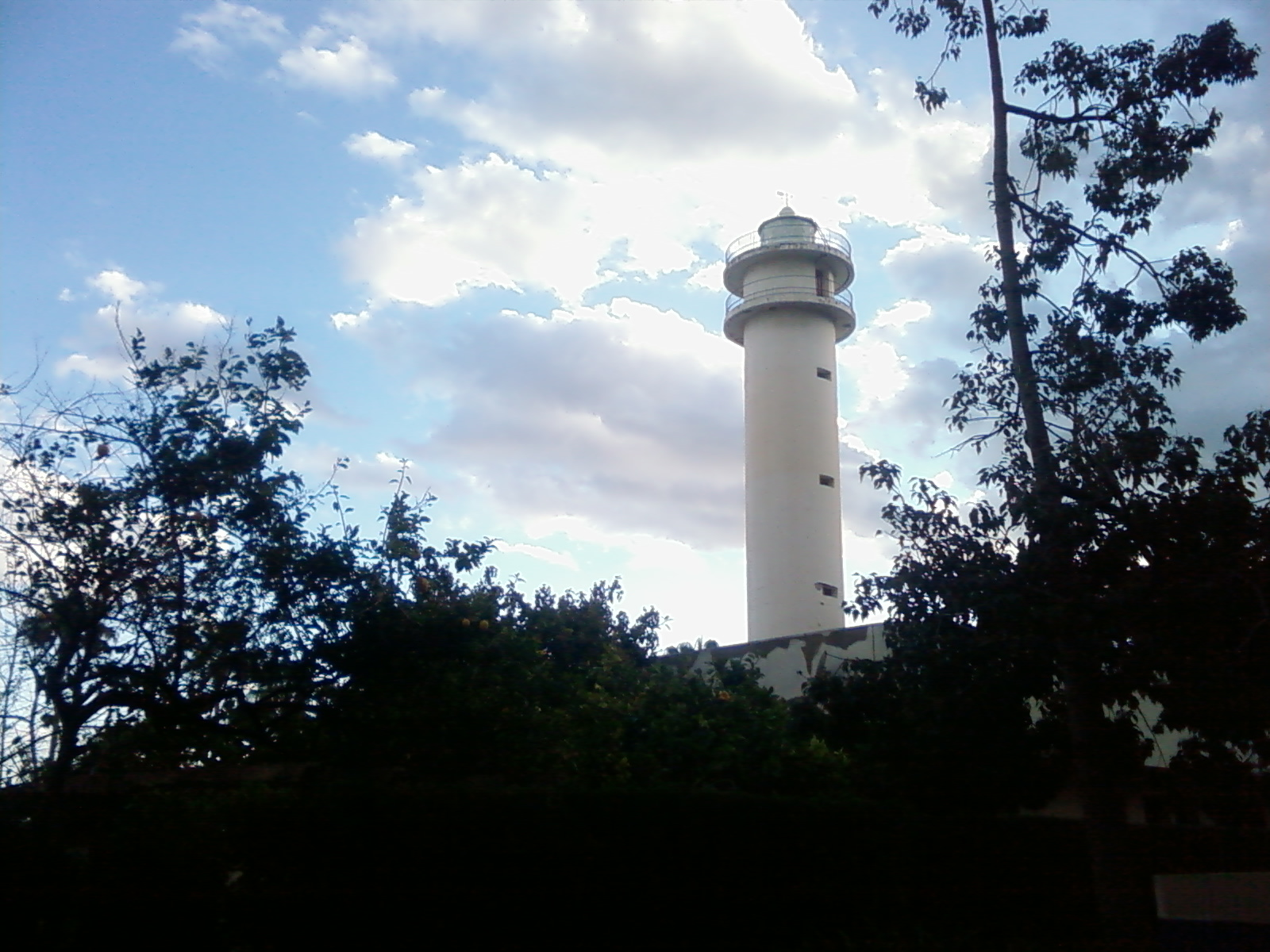
- Marbella Lighthouse
- Location: Marbella; Andalusia; Spain
- Coordinates: 36°30′26.2″N 4°53′23.9″W

Tower
- Constructed: 1864 (first)
- Construction: concrete tower
- Height: 29 metres (95 ft)
- Shape: cylindrical tower with double balcony and lantern
- Markings: white tower and lantern
- Power source: mains electricity

Light
- First lit: 1974 (current)
- Focal height: 35 metres (115 ft)
- Lens: 3rd order Barbier, Bernard & Turenne Fresnel lens
- Range: 22 nautical miles (41 km; 25 mi)
- Characteristic: Fl (2) W 14.5s.
- Spain no.: ES-21100

Marbella Lighthouse (Spanish: Faro de Marbella) is a lighthouse in Marbella, southern Spain. It was built in 1864 and is 29 metres (95 ft) high.

It is automatic and electric, its light controlled by photoelectric cells. Its light signal is two flashes every 14.5 seconds and its maximum visibility range is 22 nautical miles (41 km; 25 mi).

== See also ==
- List of lighthouses in Spain
