= Adra Lighthouse =

Lighthouse in Andalusia, Spain

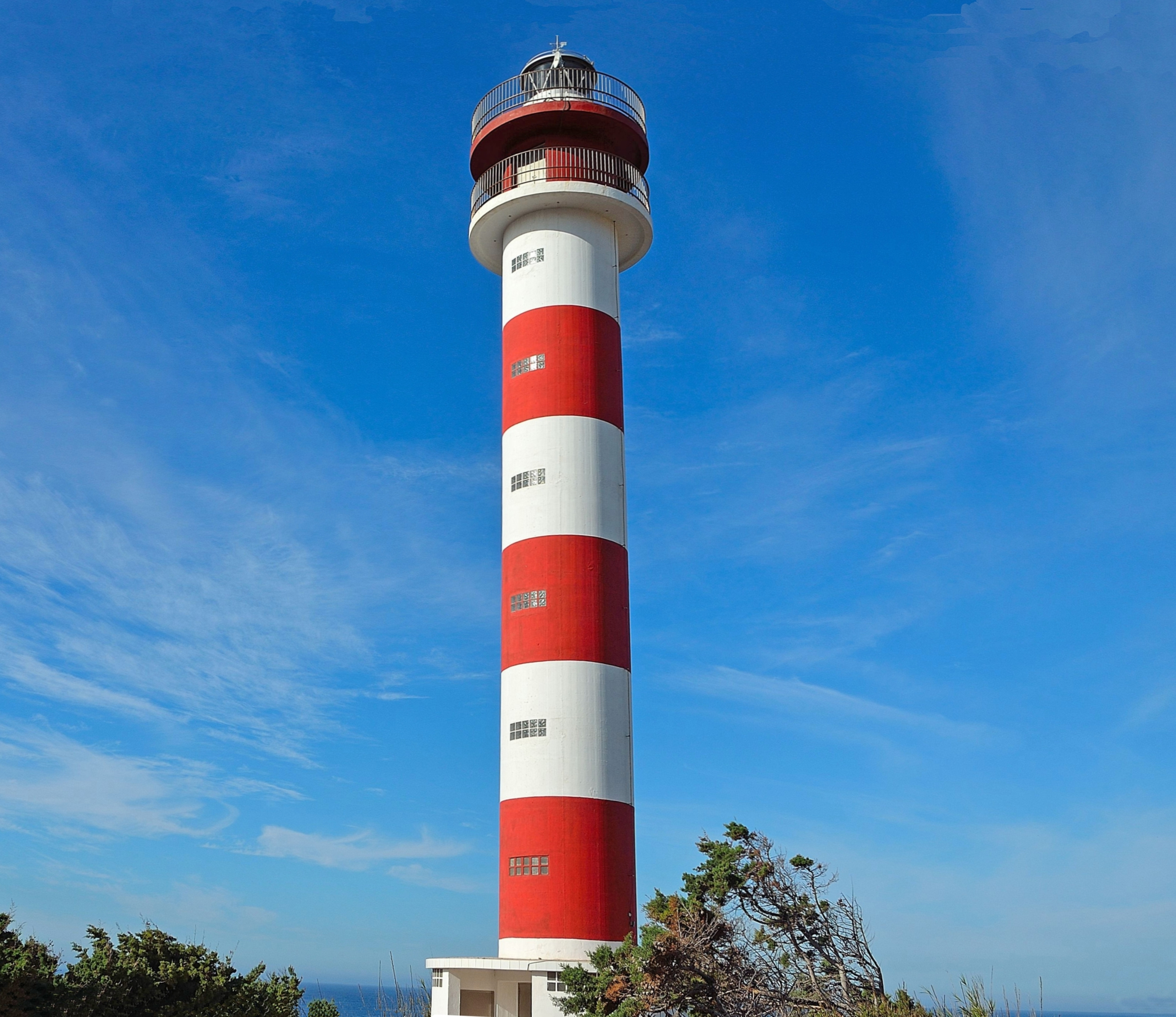
- The current lighthouse
- Location: Adra, Almería, Andulasia
- Coordinates: 36.74796°N 3.03098°W

Tower
- Constructed: 1899
- Height: 26 metres (85 ft)

Light
- First lit: 1986
- Focal height: 49 metres (161 ft)
- Range: 16 nautical miles (30 km; 18 mi)
- Characteristic: L 4 5 oc 1 0 L 1 5 oc 1 0 L 1 5 oc 1 0

The Adra Lighthouse (Spanish: Faro de Adra) is an active lighthouse near Adra in the Spanish province of Almería on the Mediterranean coast in Andulasia.

The current lighthouse built in 1986 is the third to have been constructed near to the town of Adra. The first was washed away, and the second was not tall enough to be distinguished from the lights of the town, and was replaced by the modern tower.

== History ==
The first project to provide a beacon for Adra dates back to 1861, when the engineer Antonio Molina proposed to construct a light based on the screw pile design of Mitchell, similar to that of La Banya Lighthouse near Tarragona. His proposals were rejected, and instead a 13-metre-high (43 ft) wooden tower was built to the east of the town, by the old mouth of the River Adra. It became operational in 1883, but the site was undermined by erosion, and in 1896 it was destroyed by a storm.

A second lighthouse was then built nearer the town in 1899. Of similar construction to other 19th century Spanish lights, it had a lantern room on a short 6-metre-high (20 ft) tower attached to the rear of a single storey keeper's house. The growth of the town, which included the construction of a harbour in 1910 began to cause problems with distinguishing the light from those of the surrounding buildings, which included the 45-metre-high (148 ft) shot tower.

The current light was built on a small promontory on the western side of the town in 1986, and consists of a 26-metre-high (85 ft) concrete tower, with twin galleries. It has a distinctive daymark or red and white bands. With a focal height of 49 metres (161 ft) above the sea, its light can be seen for 16 nautical miles, and has a characteristic of three flashes of white light every ten and a half seconds. It is registered under the international Admiralty number E0088 and has the NGA identifier of 113-4424, and is managed and operated by the Almería Port Authority.

== See also ==
- List of lighthouses in Spain
