= Touriñán Lighthouse =

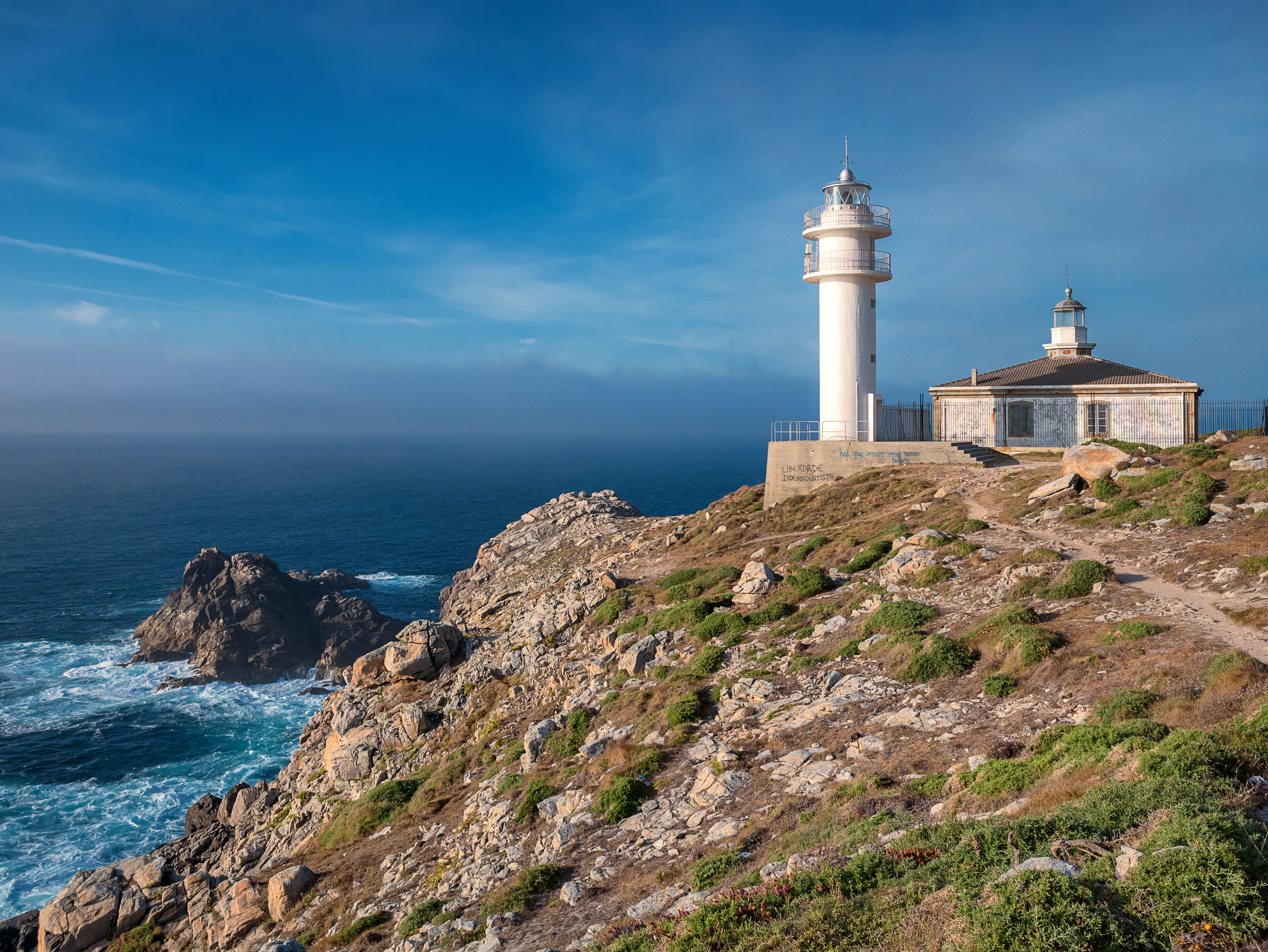
- New light (left) and old light (right)
- Location: Muxia, Spain
- Coordinates: 43°03′12″N 9°17′54″W

Tower
- Constructed: 1898
- Height: 14 m (46 ft)

Light
- Focal height: 65 metres
- Range: 24 nautical miles (44 km)
- Characteristic: L 0 2 oc 2 2 L 0 2 oc 6 1 L 0 2 oc 6 1

The Touriñán Lighthouse is an active lighthouse located in Muxía, province of A Coruña, Galicia, Spain. The current lighthouse is the second to be constructed at Cabo Touriñán a rocky headland on the Costa da Morte. It is managed by the port authority of A Coruña.

== History ==
The first lighthouse at Touriñán, was completed in 1898, and consists of a single storey keeper's house with the tower centrally located at the apex of the roof.

A new lighthouse, which was built adjacent to the original building first entered service in 1981. It consists of a 11m high cylinder-shaped tower, that supports twin galleries and a lantern with a grey cupola. With a focal height of 65m above sea level, the light can be seen for 24 nautical miles. Its light characteristic is made up of a pattern of three flashes of white light every fifteen seconds.

== See also ==
- List of lighthouses in Spain
- The Lighthouse Way
