= Cape Ortegal Lighthouse =

Lighthouse in Galicia, Spain

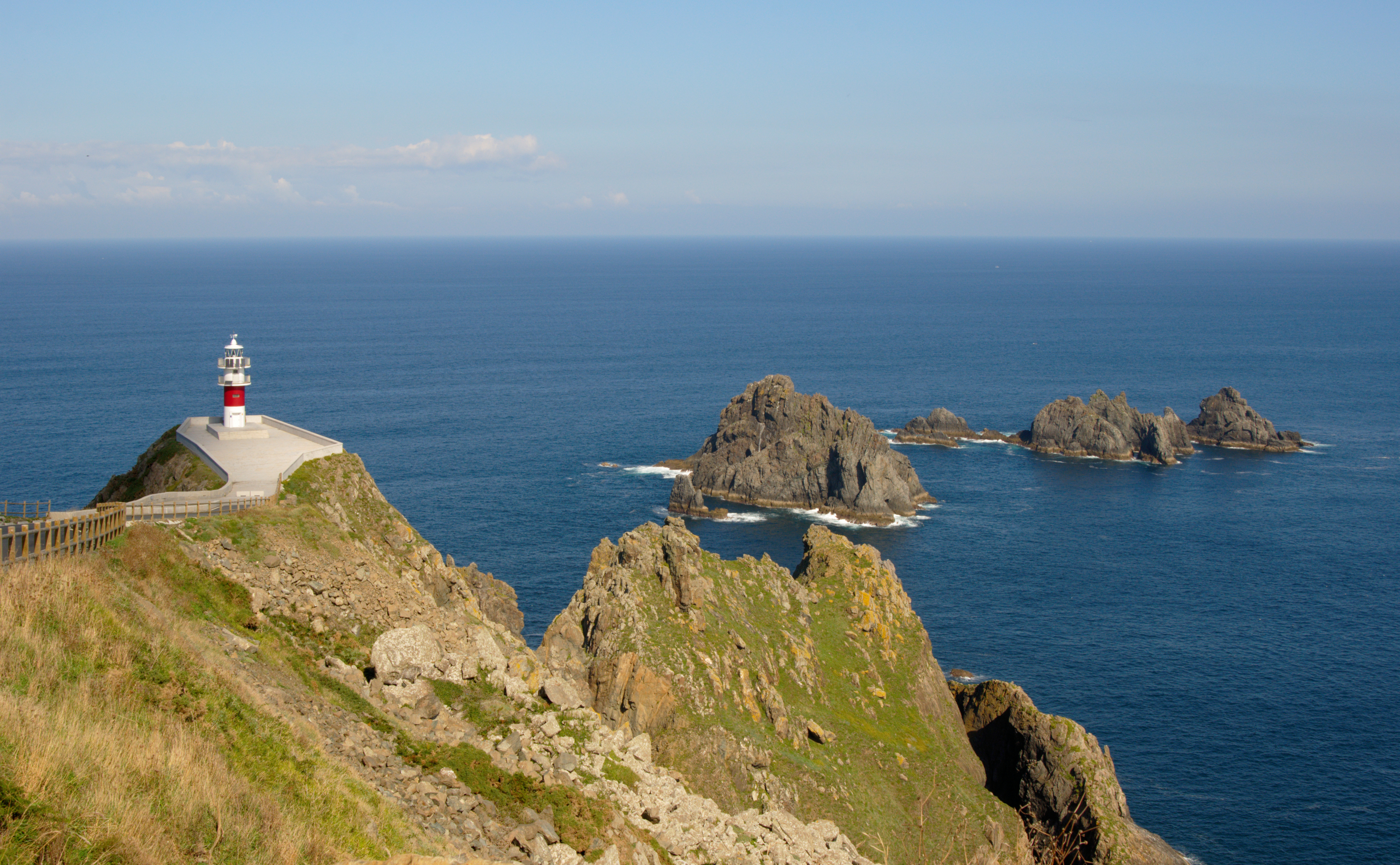
- General view of the lighthouse and the cape
- Location: Cape Ortegal, Cariño, Spain
- Coordinates: 43°46′16″N 7°52′10″W

Tower
- Constructed: 1984
- Construction: concrete
- Height: 10 m (33 ft)
- Shape: cylinder
- Markings: White (tower), red (stripe), white (balcony)
- Power source: solar power
- Operator: Port Authority of Ferrol-San Cibrao

Light
- Focal height: 124 m (407 ft)
- Range: 18 nmi (33 km; 21 mi)
- Characteristic: Oc W 8s
- Spain no.: 03160

Cape Ortegal Lighthouse (Galician: Faro de Cabo Ortegal) is a lighthouse in the Province of A Coruña, Galicia, Spain. It was planned and approved in 1982 and completed in 1984. It consists of a white cylindrical concrete tower 3 metres (9.8 ft) in diameter and 12.7 metres (42 ft) tall with a red stripe and two balconies 4.7 metres (15 ft) in diameter.

== See also ==
- List of lighthouses in Spain
