= Sancti Petri Lighthouse =

Sancti Petri Lighthouse Faro de Sancti Petri
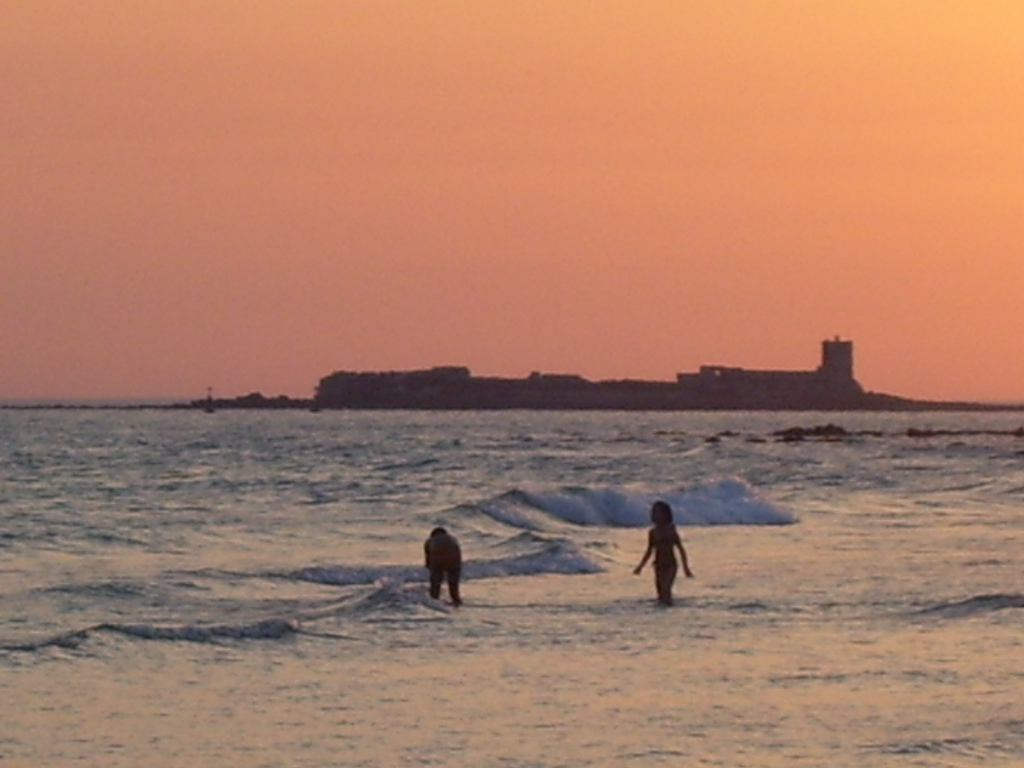
- The Island of Sancti Petri with the lighthouse at right
- Location: Province of Cádiz, Spain
- Coordinates: 36°22′09″N 6°13′02″W
- Constructed: 1918
- Construction: concrete tower
- Height: 16 metres (52 ft)
- Shape: square tower with lantern on the roof
- Markings: unpainted tower, white lantern
- Operator: Comisión de faros

Light
- Focal height: 20 metres (66 ft)
- Range: 9 nautical miles (17 km; 10 mi)
- Characteristic: Fl W 3s
- Spain no.: ES-10630

Lighthouse of Sancti Petri (Spanish: Faro de Sancti Petri) is a lighthouse located on the island of Sancti Petri between the town of San Fernando and Chiclana de la Frontera in the Province of Cádiz, Andalusia, Spain. On October 28, 1918, the lighthouse was installed on the keep by the ruined castle.

== See also ==
- List of lighthouses in Spain
