= Punta Candelaria Lighthouse =

Punta Candelaria Lighthouse Punta Candieira
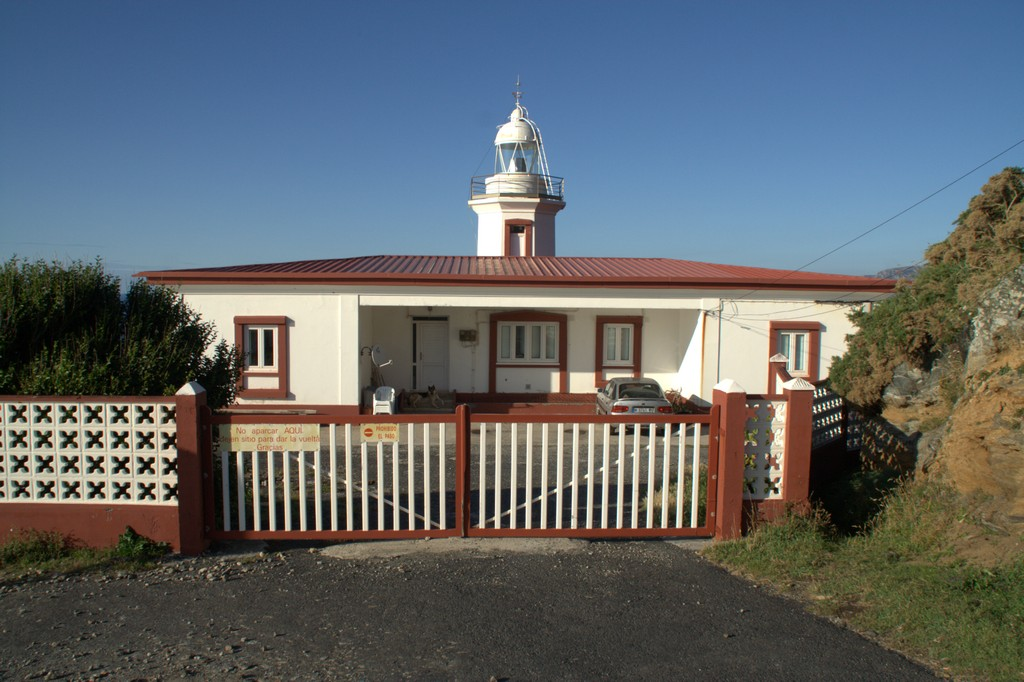
- Punta Candelaria Lighthouse
- Location: Cedeira; Province of A Coruña; Galicia; Spain
- Coordinates: 43.710879°N 8.047129°W

Tower
- Constructed: 1954
- Construction: masonry tower
- Height: 9 metres (30 ft)
- Shape: octagonal tower with balcony and lantern
- Markings: white tower and lantern, red trim
- Power source: mains electricity
- Operator: Autoridad Portuaria de Ferrol - San Cibrao

Light
- Focal height: 89 metres (292 ft)
- Range: 21 nautical miles (39 km; 24 mi)
- Characteristic: Fl (3+1) W 24s.
- Spain no.: ES-03170

Lighthouse of Punta Candelaria (Spanish: Faro de Punta Candelaria) is a lighthouse in Cedeira in the Province of A Coruña, Galicia, Spain. It was constructed between 1929 and 1933 and entered service in 1954.

== See also ==
- List of lighthouses in Spain
