= Cabo Touriñán =

Extreme westerly point of Spain

Coordinates: 43.051°N 9.294°W

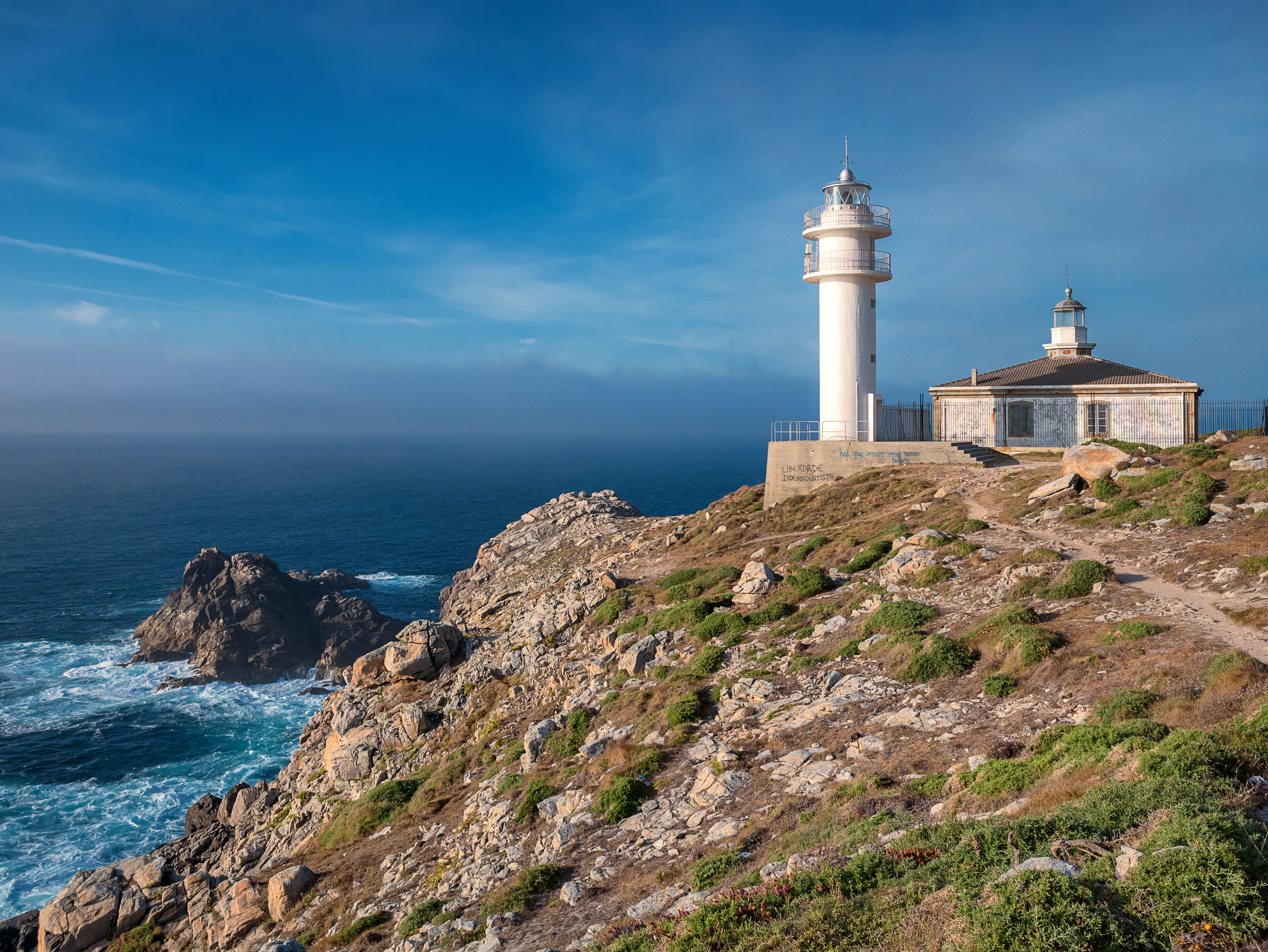
Cabo Touriñán.

Cabo Touriñán is a small peninsula that is the most westerly point of Peninsular Spain. It is in the municipality of Muxía, which is in the province of A Coruña and the autonomous community of Galicia. The Cape, along with the rest of Muxía, is best known as a destination for pilgrims who extend the Camino de Santiago by walking to the Atlantic coast after reaching the holy city of Santiago de Compostela.

== Description ==
The cape is a small peninsula that juts about 1 km into the sea, the narrowest section being an isthmus 150 metres wide between the coasts of Balal and Cuño. Its maximum altitude is 93 metres above sea level. The rock is made of is granite, the erosion of which has caused the formation of deposits of pebbles, known as coídos, and stony bars, which formed an islet such as the so-called A Ínsua on the west side of the cape. The western point of the cape, Os Buxeirados, has a series of rocks that go into the sea around 300 to 400 m, known as A Laxe de Buxeirados or Bajos de Buxeirados. The rocks have proved dangerous for navigation, causing some serious shipwrecks.

Its rugged landscape causes the cape to have vegetation comprising largely thorny reeds, or gorse such as Ulex europaeus. In the north of the cape are Touriñán Lighthouse and its complementary buildings, which were established 15 December 1898.

== Name ==
The name comes from the nearby parish of Touriñán, of which the cape is part, and that is presumed to go back to the Latin name, which is supposed to be "Taurinius" or "Taurinianus" through the genitive "Tauriniani".

== Gallery ==
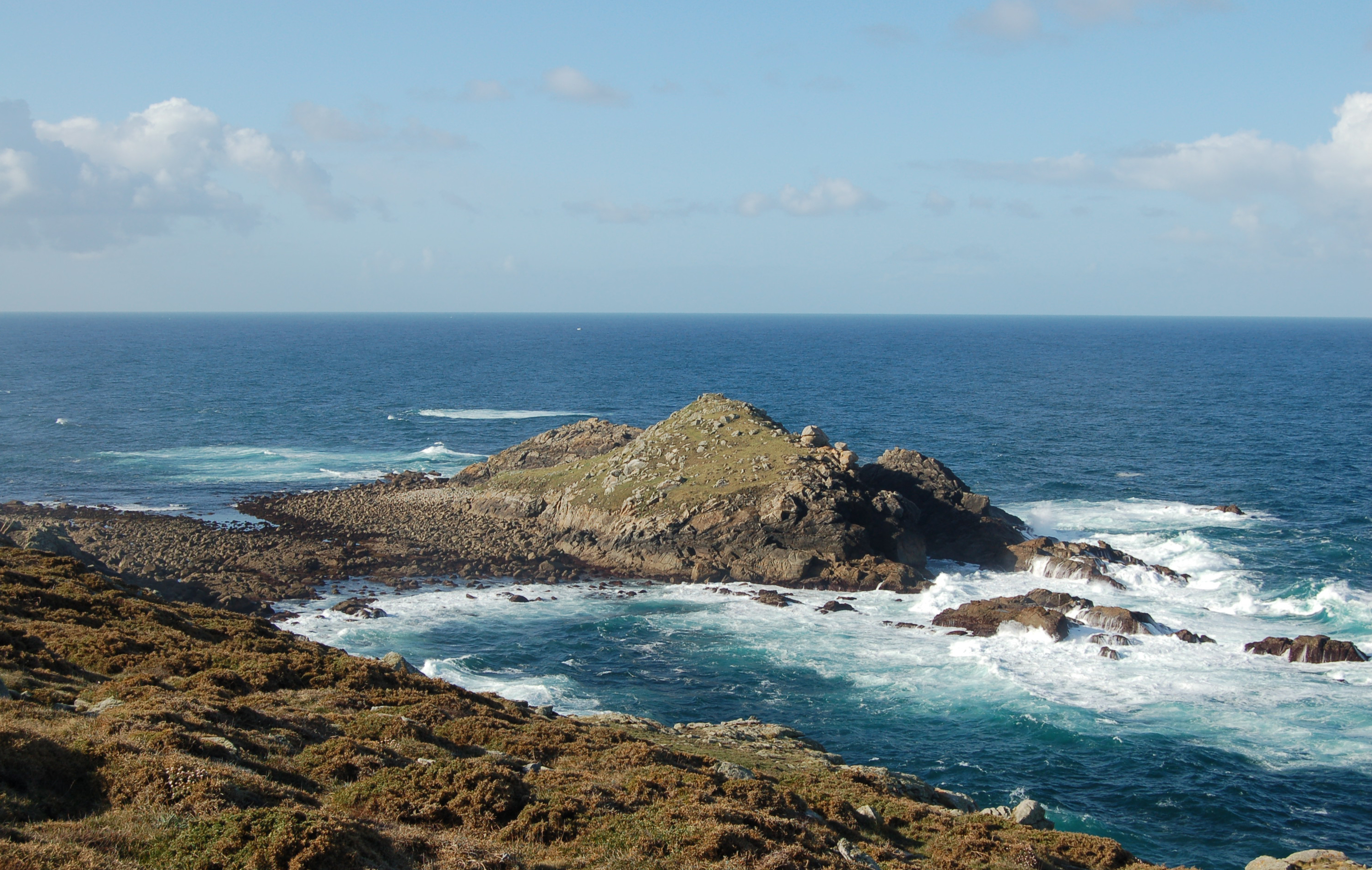
Illa do Castelo.

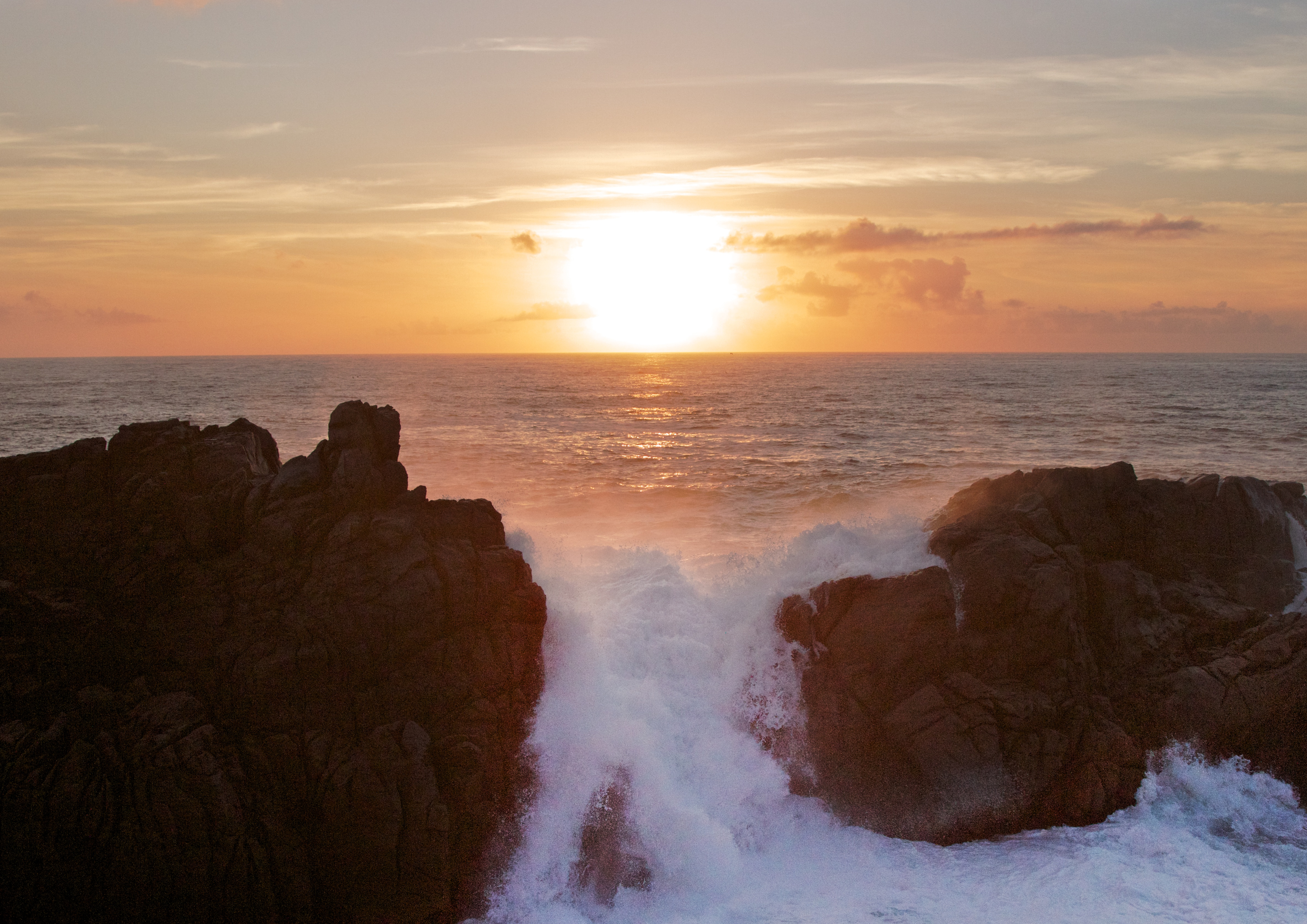

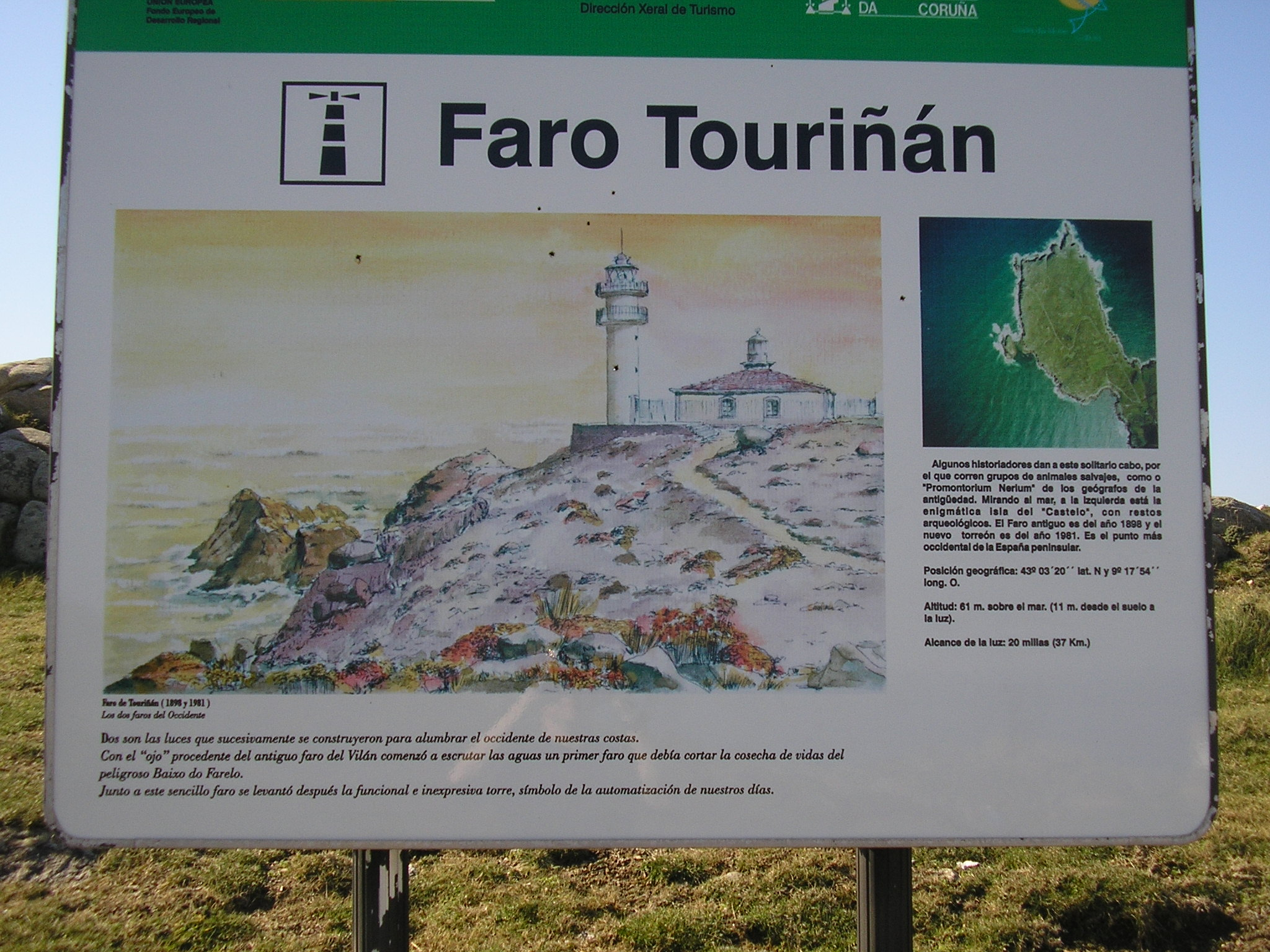

== See also ==
- Cape Finisterre
- Extreme points of Spain
- Touriñán Lighthouse
