= Lariño =

Settlement in san martiño, spain

Coordinates: 42°46′37″N 9°06′59″W

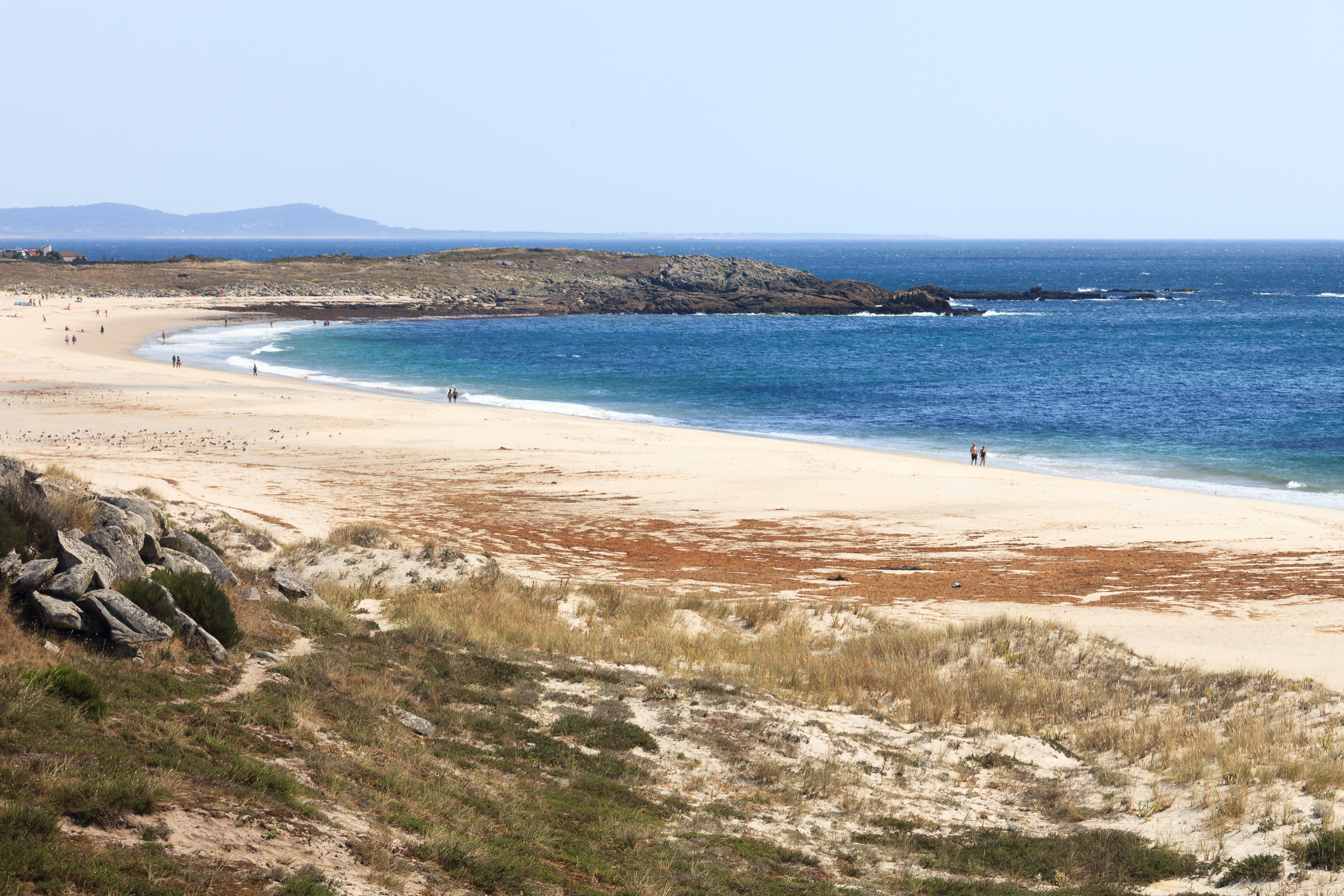
Praia de Lariño

Lariño is the name of a settlement in San Martiño parroquia in Galicia, Spain, in the province of A Coruña. It also is home to a beach, praia de Lariño.
