= Calaburras Lighthouse =

Lighthouse in Andalusia, Spain

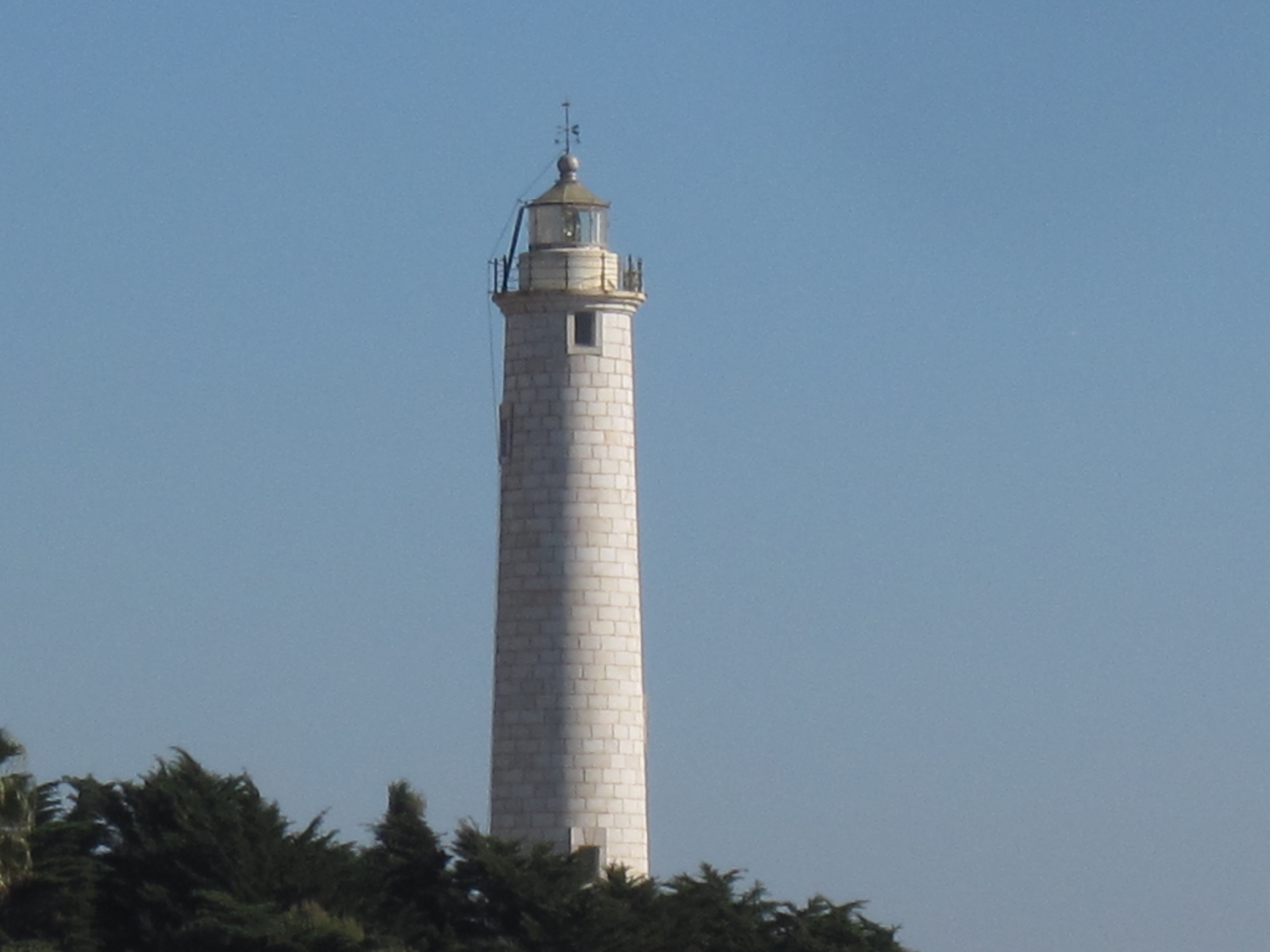
- Calaburras Lighthouse in 2011
- Location: Calaburras Point; Mijas; Province of Málaga; Andalusia; Spain
- Coordinates: 36.507402°N 4.639743°W

Tower
- Constructed: 1863 (first)
- Construction: stone tower (current) masonry tower (first)
- Height: 25 metres (82 ft) (current); 13.5 metres (44 ft) (first)
- Shape: cylindrical tower with balcony and lantern (current) octagonal tower with balcony and lantern (first)
- Markings: unpainted tower, glass lantern, grey lantern roof
- Power source: mains electricity
- Operator: Autoridad Portuaria de Málaga

Light
- First lit: 1928 (current)
- Focal height: 46 metres (151 ft)
- Range: 18 nautical miles (33 km; 21 mi)
- Characteristic: Fl W 5s.
- Spain no.: ES-21280

Calaburras Lighthouse (Spanish: Faro de Calaburras) is a lighthouse located at the coastal point known as Punta de Calaburras near Mijas, Málaga province, in Spain.

The station was the first air/sea lighthouse in Spain and was built in 1863 and rebuilt in 1928. It is the main beacon of the province. The light is used by ships and planes navigating the Strait of Gibraltar.

The present lighthouse is 29 metres (95 ft) high having replaced a 13.5 metres (44 ft) high masonry tower. Its signal is automatic and electric since 1949. Its light signal flashes every 5 seconds and its maximum visibility range is 28 nautical miles.

== See also ==
- List of lighthouses in Spain
