= List of beaches in Menorca =

This is a list of Menorcan beaches:

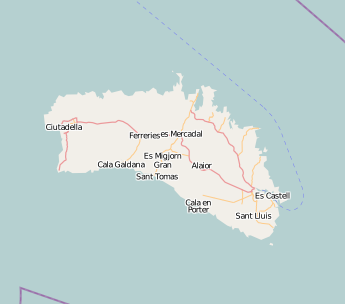
Beaches in Menorca

== Beaches by municipality ==
=== Ciutadella ===
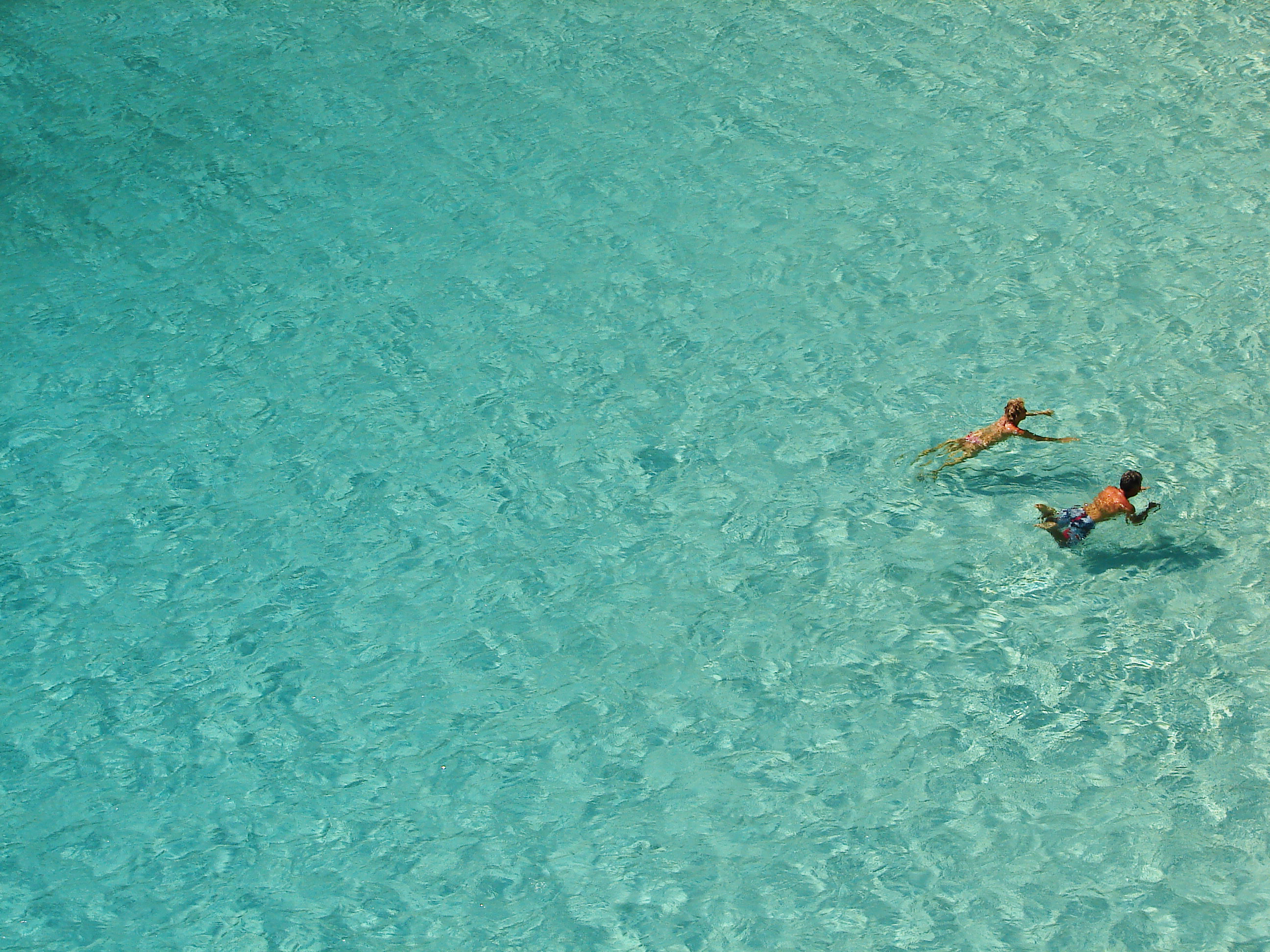
Macarelleta, Ciutadella

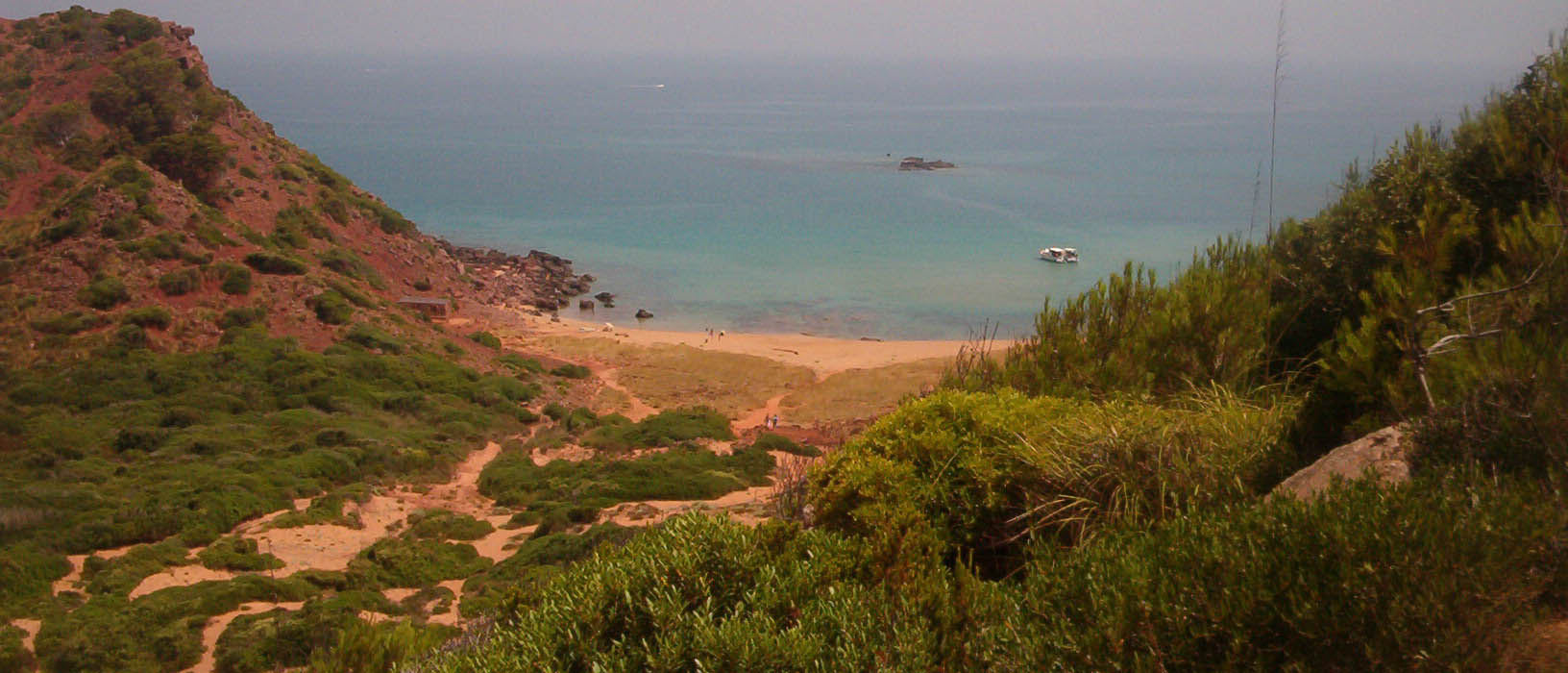
Cala Pilar, Ciutadella

- Cala Pilar
- Algaiarens
- Platja d'es Bots
- Cala Morell
- Cala en Forcat
- Cala en Blanes
- Cala des Frares
- Sa Caleta
- Cala Santandría
- Sa Caleta den Gorries
- Cala Blanca
- Cala en Bosc
- Son Xoriguer
- Son Saura
- Es Talaier
- Cala en Turqueta
- Macarelleta
- Macarella

=== Ferreries ===
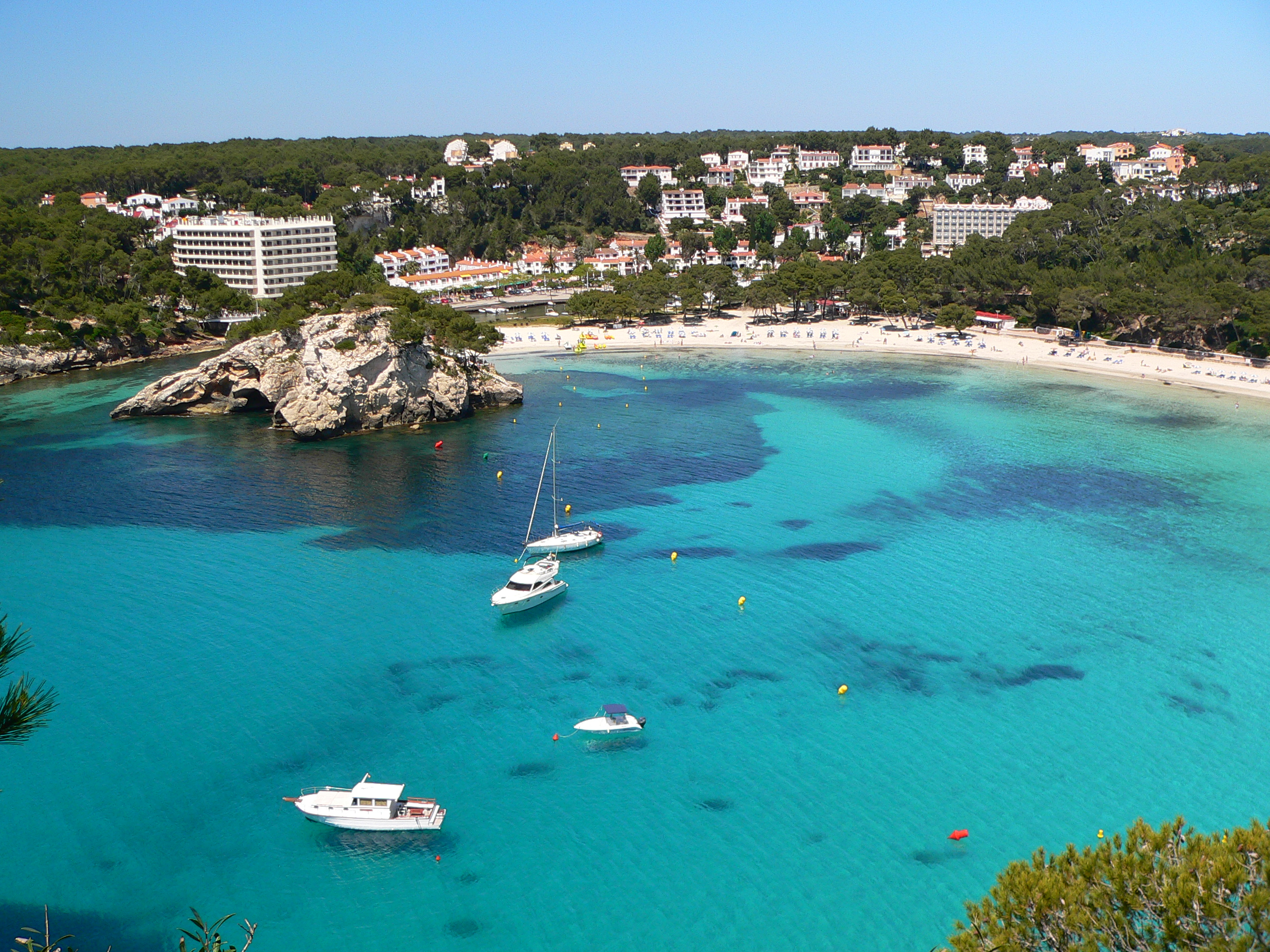
Cala Galdana, Ferreries

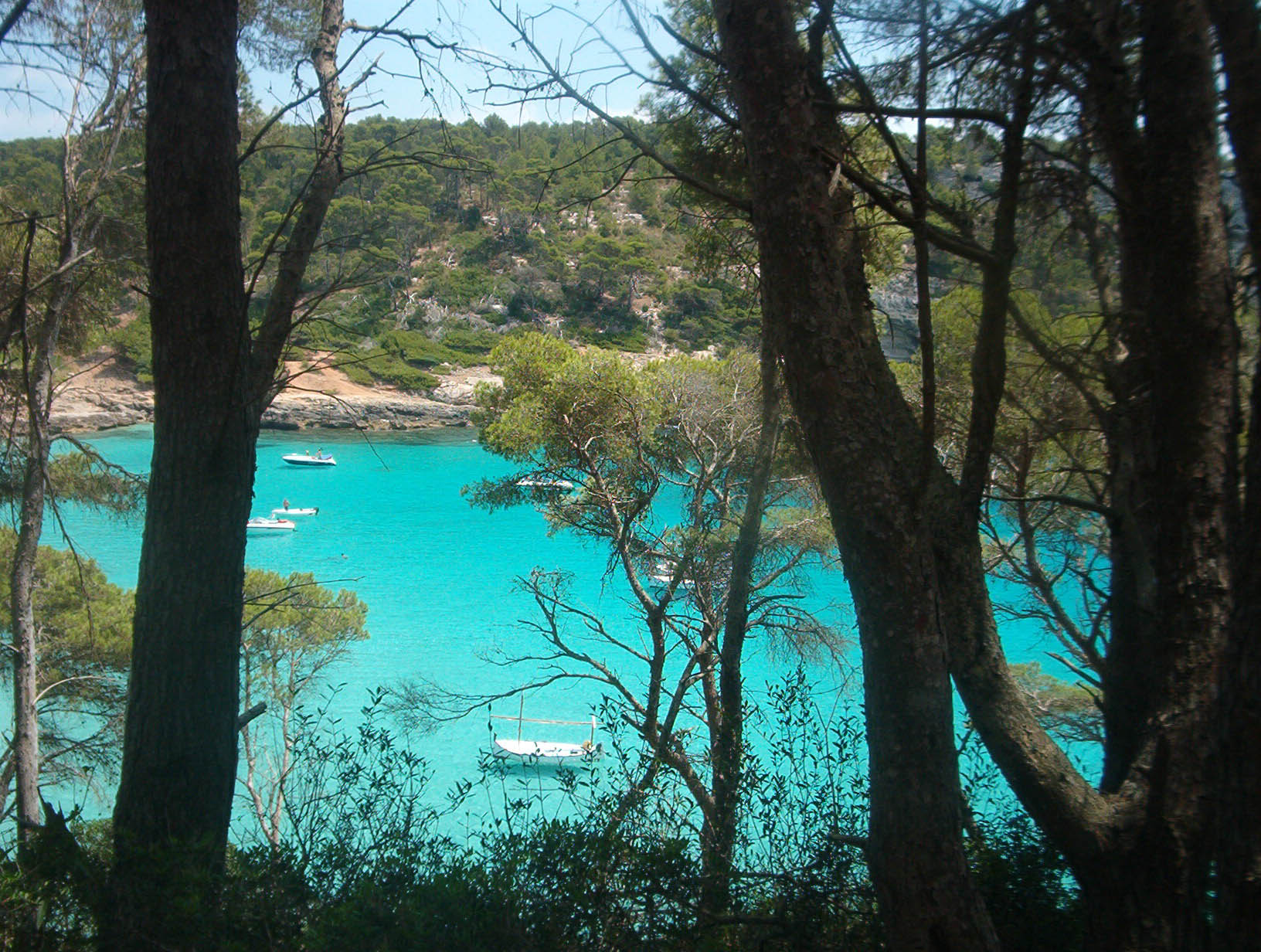
Cala Trebalúger, Ferreries

- Cala Galdana
- Cala Mitjana
- Cala Trebalúger
- Ets Alocs

=== Es Mercadal ===
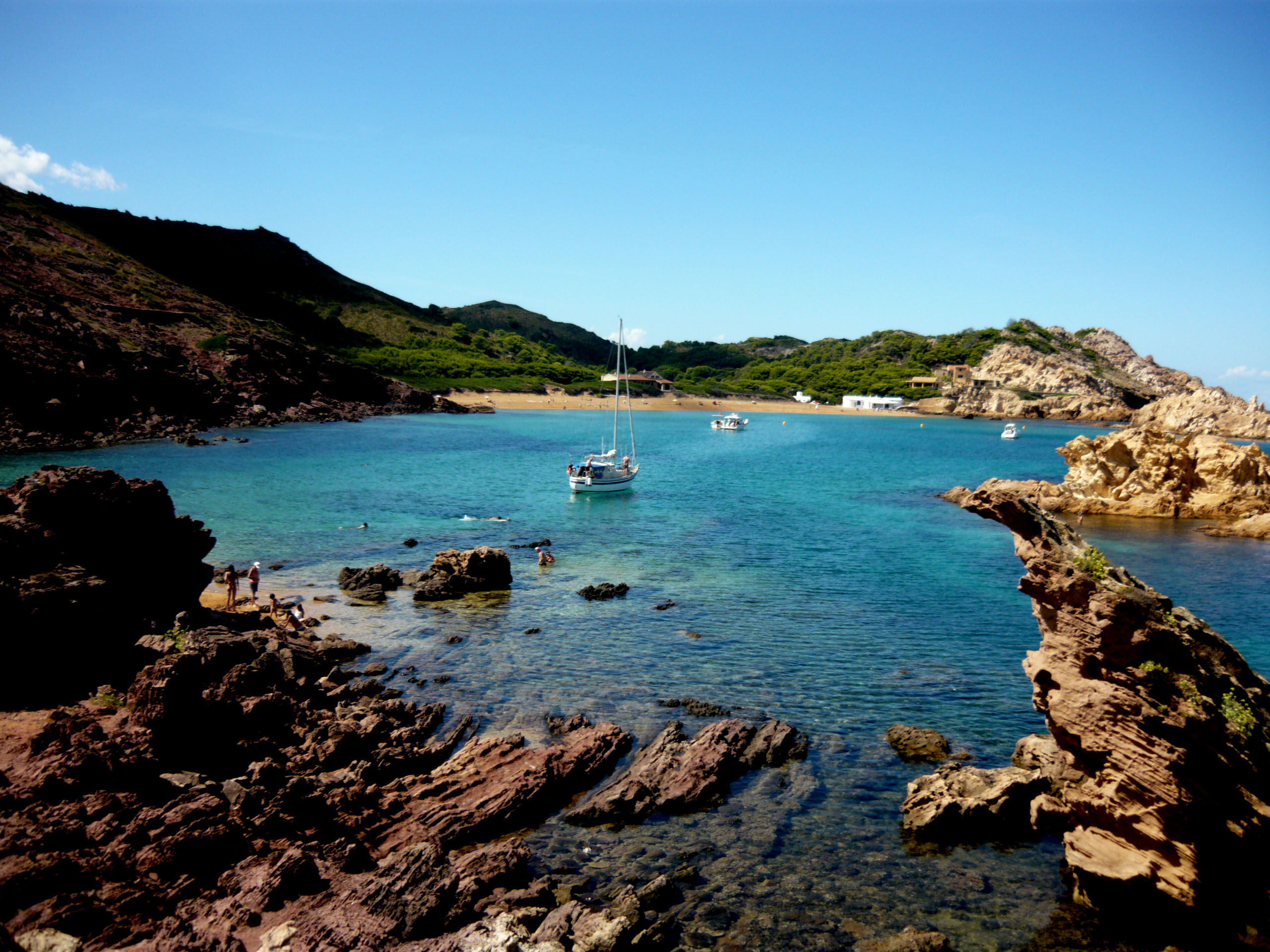
Cala Pregonda, Es Mercadal

- Arenal d'en Castell
- Son Parc
- Arenal de Son Saura
- Arenal de Tirant
- Binimel·là
- Cala Pregonda
- Cavalleria Beach

=== Es Migjorn Gran ===
- Binigaus
- Cala Escorxada
- Cala Fustam
- Sant Tomás

=== Alaior ===
- Son Bou
- Cala En Porter
- Cala Llucalari

=== Mahón ===
- Cala Binidalí
- Cala es Murtar
- Cala Mesquida Beach
- Es Grau

=== Sant Lluís ===
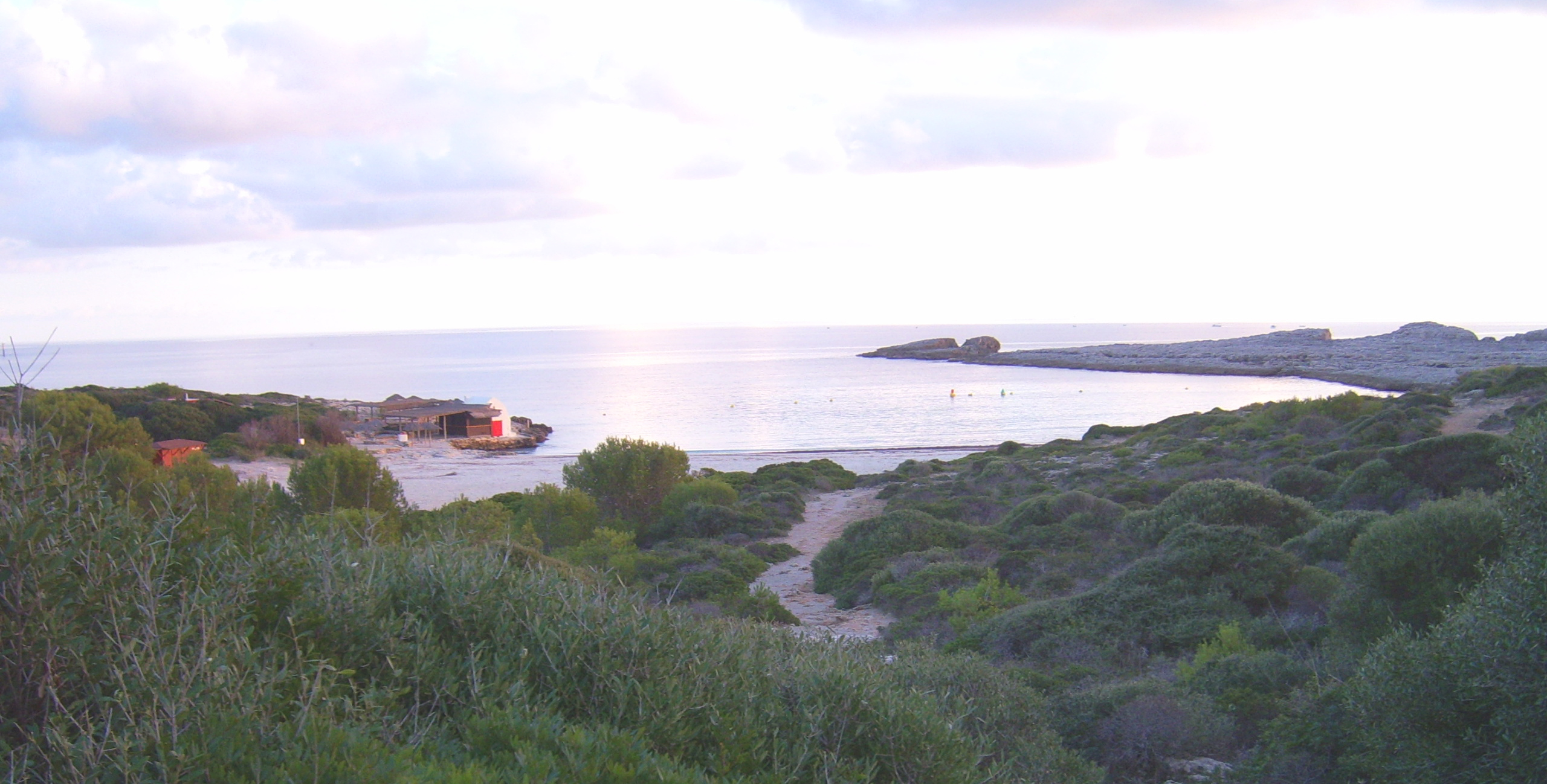
Binibeca Beach, Sant Lluís

- Binisafúller
- Binibeca Beach
- Cala Torret
- Biniancolla
- Punta Prima Beach
- Alcalfar

=== Es Castell ===
- Cala Padera
- Cala Rafalet

== See also ==
- List of beaches in Spain
- Beaches in Ferrol, Spain
- List of beaches
