= List of lighthouses in the Balearic Islands =

This is a list of lighthouses in the Balearic Islands. The Spanish archipelago lies at the western end of the Mediterranean Sea.

== Lighthouses ==
Lighthouse	Image	Location coordinates	Island	Built	Tower height	Focal height	Range
Alcanada		Alcúdia; 39.83541°N 3.17117°E	Mallorca	1861	15 m (49 ft)	22 m (72 ft)	11 nmi (20 km)
Bleda Plana		Sant Josep de sa Talaia; 38.97984°N 1.15902°E	Ibiza	1972	8 m (26 ft)	28 m (92 ft)	10 nmi (19 km)
Botafoc		Ibiza (town); 38.90416°N 1.45388°E	Ibiza	1861	16 m (52 ft)	31 m (102 ft)	14 nmi (26 km)
Cala Figuera		Son Ferrer; 39.45749°N 2.52237°E	Mallorca	1860	24 m (79 ft)	45 m (148 ft)	22 nmi (41 km)
Cap Blanc		Llucmajor; 39.36351°N 2.78780°E	Mallorca	1863	12 m (39 ft)	95 m (312 ft)	15 nmi (28 km)
Cap d'Artrutx		Cala en Bosch; 39.92258°N 3.82424°E	Menorca	1859	34 m (112 ft)	45 m (148 ft)	19 nmi (35 km)
Cap de Barbaría		Formentera; 38.6411°N 1.38951°E	Formentera	1972	19 m (62 ft)	78 m (256 ft)	20 nmi (37 km)
Cap Gros		Port de Sóller; 39.7971°N 2.68161°E	Mallorca	1859	22 m (72 ft)	120 m (394 ft)	19 nmi (35 km)
Cap Salines		Santanyí; 39.26521°N 3.05341°E	Mallorca	1863	17 m (56 ft)	17 m (56 ft)	11 nmi (20 km)
Capdepera		Capdepera; 39.71558°N 3.47752°E	Mallorca	1861	18 m (59 ft)	76 m (249 ft)	20 nmi (37 km)
Cavalleria		Sanisera; 40.08909°N 4.09227°E	Menorca	1857	15 m (49 ft)	94 m (308 ft)	26 nmi (48 km)
Ciutadella		Ciutadella; 39.99621°N 3.82276°E	Menorca	1863	13 m (43 ft)	21 m (69 ft)	14 nmi (26 km)
Conillera		Illa Conillera; 38.99361°N 1.21262°E	Ibiza	1857	18 m (59 ft)	85 m (279 ft)	18 nmi (33 km)
La Creu		Port de Sóller; 39.79695°N 2.68940°E	Mallorca	1864/1945	13 m (43 ft)	35 m (115 ft)	10 nmi (19 km)
En Pou		S'Espalmador; 38.79902°N 1.42162°E	Formentera	1864	25 m (82 ft)	28 m (92 ft)	10 nmi (19 km)
Favàritx		Mahón; 39.99724°N 4.26684°E	Menorca	1922	28 m (92 ft)	47 m (154 ft)	21 nmi (39 km)
Formentor		Cap de Formentor; 39.96145°N 3.21271°E	Mallorca	1863	21 m (69 ft)	210 m (689 ft)	24 nmi (44 km)
Illa de l'Aire		Illa de l'Aire; 39.79945°N 4.293180°E	Menorca	1860	38 m (125 ft)	53 m (174 ft)	18 nmi (33 km)
Illa des Penjats		Sant Francesc de s'Estany; 38.81451°N 1.41178°E	Ibiza	1861	17 m (56 ft)	27 m (89 ft)	10 nmi (19 km)
Llebeig		Dragonera; 39.57417°N 2.30460°E	Dragonera	1910	15 m (49 ft)	130 m (427 ft)	21 nmi (39 km)
La Mola		Formentera; 38.66337°N 1.58430°E	Formentera	1861	22 m (72 ft)	142 m (466 ft)	23 nmi (43 km)
Na Foradada		Cabrera; 39.20711°N 2.97862°E	Cabrera	1926	13 m (43 ft)	42 m (138 ft)	10 nmi (19 km)
Na Pòpia		Dragonera; 39.58636°N 2.31713°E	Dragonera	1852	12 m (39 ft)	363 m (1,191 ft)	Inactive
N'Ensiola		Cabrera; 39.12919°N 2.92145°E	Cabrera	1870	21 m (69 ft)	121 m (397 ft)	20 nmi (37 km)
Porto Colom		Felanitx; 39.41402°N 3.27065°E	Mallorca	1861	25 m (82 ft)	42 m (138 ft)	20 nmi (37 km)
Porto Pí		Palma; 39.54858°N 2.62362°E	Mallorca	1617	38 m (125 ft)	41 m (135 ft)	18 nmi (33 km)
Punta de l'Avançada		Port de Pollença; 39.89985°N 3.11064°E	Mallorca	1905	18 m (59 ft)	29 m (95 ft)	15 nmi (28 km)
Punta Moscarter		Portinatx; 39.11762°N 1.53317°E	Ibiza	1978	52 m (171 ft)	93 m (305 ft)	18 nmi (33 km)
Punta Nati		Ciutadella; 40.05021°N 3.82363°E	Menorca	1913	19 m (62 ft)	42 m (138 ft)	18 nmi (33 km)
Sa Mola		Andratx; 39.53175°N 2.36425°E	Mallorca	1993	10 m (33 ft)	128 m (420 ft)	12 nmi (22 km)
Tagomago		Tagomago; 39.03257°N 1.64909°E	Ibiza	1914	23 m (75 ft)	86 m (282 ft)	21 nmi (39 km)
Torre den Beu		Cala Figuera; 39.32966°N 3.17699°E	Mallorca	Unknown	6 m (20 ft)	32 m (105 ft)	10 nmi (19 km)
Tramuntana		Dragonera; 39.59803°N 2.33818°E	Dragonera	1910	15 m (49 ft)	67 m (220 ft)	14 nmi (26 km)

== See also ==
- List of lighthouses in Spain
- List of lighthouses in the Canary Islands
