= List of beaches in Spain =

This is a list of beaches in Spain sorted by province. The most popular with visitors are in Andalusia, Costa Blanca, and Catalonia.

Spanish "costas"

== Andalusia ==
=== Almería ===
- Villaricos
- Las Negras
- San José

=== Cádiz ===
- Sanlúcar de Barrameda
  - Bonanza beach
  - Bajo de Guía beach
  - La Calzada/Piletas beach
  - La Jara beach
- Chipiona
  - Montijo beach
  - Cruz del Mar beach
  - Las Canteeras beach
  - La Regla beach
  - Camarón/Tres piedras beach

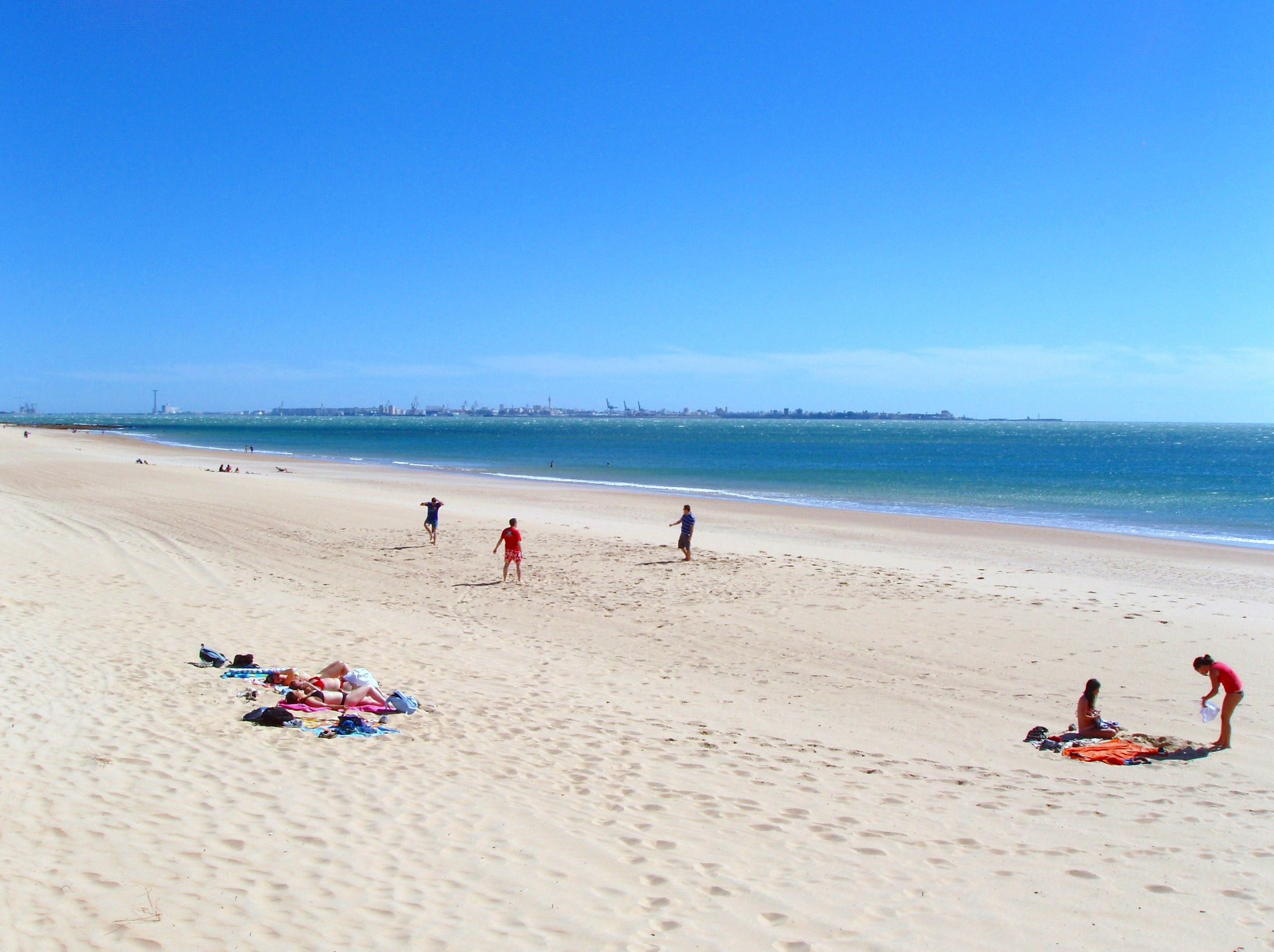
El Buzo beach in El Puerto de Santa María

- El Puerto de Santa María
  - Fuentebravía beach
  - Santa Catalina beach
  - El Buzo beach
  - La Calita/Caletha del agua beach
  - La Puntilla beach
  - Valdelagrana beach
  - Levante/Los Toruños beach
- Rota
  - La Ballena beach
  - Aguadulce/Peginas beach
  - Punta Candor beach
  - Piedras Gordas beach
  - La Costilla beach
  - El Rompidillo beach
- Puerto Real
  - La Cachucha beach
  - Río San Pedro beach

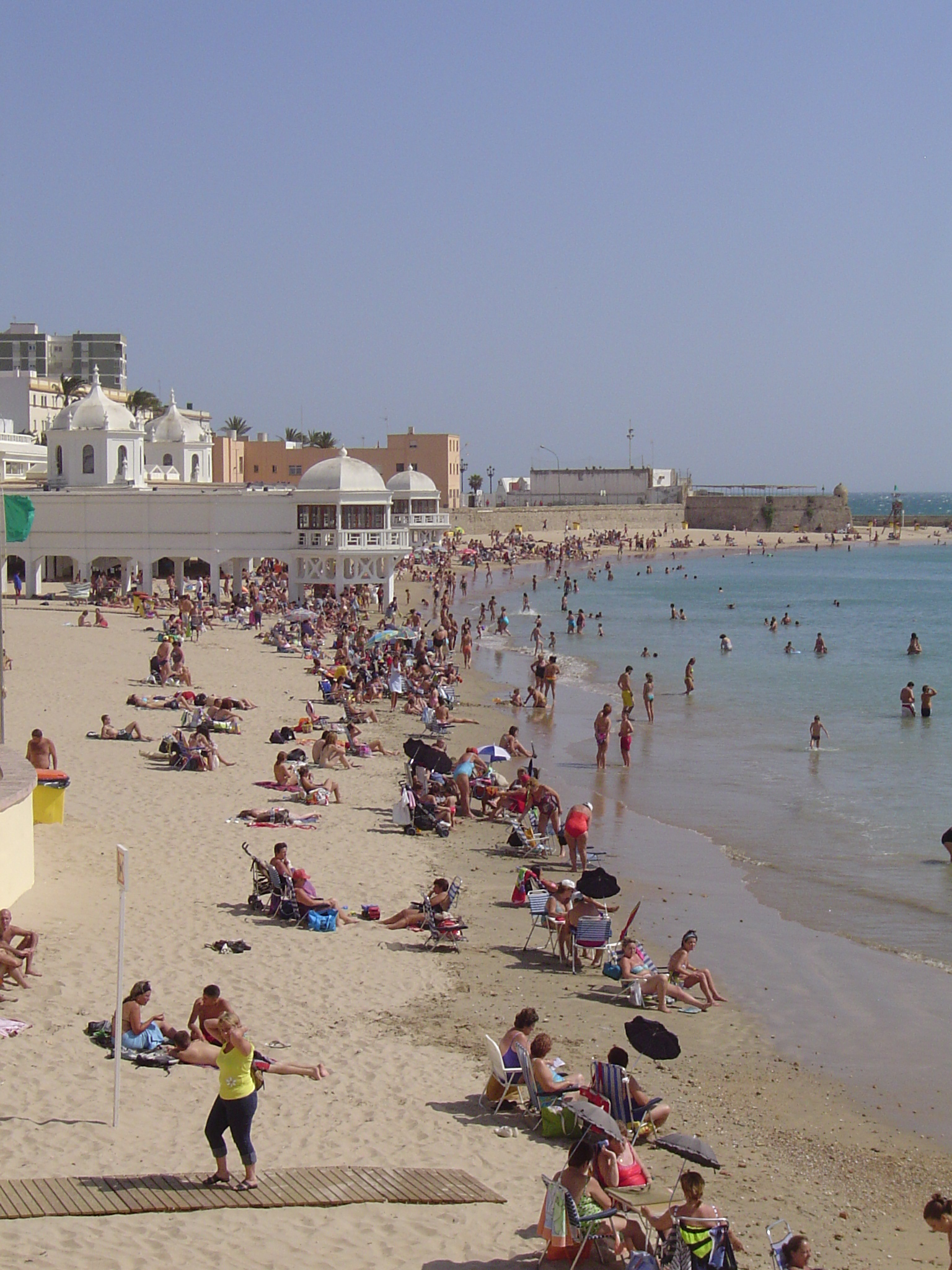
La Caleta beach

- Cádiz
  - La Caleta beach
  - Santa María del Mar beach
  - La Victoria beach
  - Cortadura beach
  - El Chato/Torregorda beach
  - La Anegada beach
- San Fernando
  - Camposoto beach
  - El Castillo beach
- Chiclana de la Frontera
  - Lavaculos/Sancti-Petri beach
  - Punta de Piedras beach
  - La Barrosa beach
  - El Puerco beach
- Conil de la Frontera
  - Roche beach
  - Calas de Poniente beach
  - Cala del Aceite beach
  - Calas de Quinto y Camacho beach
  - Fuente del Gallo beach
  - La Fontanilla beach
  - Los Bateles beach
  - Castilnovo beach
- Vejer de la Frontera
  - El Palmar beach
- Barbate
  - Zahora beach
  - Calños de Meca/Cabo de Trafalgar beach
  - Hierbabuena beach
  - El Carmen beach
  - Cañillos/Pajares beach
  - Zahara de los Atunes beach
- Tarifa
  - Atlanterra/Zahara de los Atunes beach
  - Los Alemanes beach
  - El Cañuelo beach
  - Bolonia beach
  - Valdevaqueros beach
  - Playa de Los Lances (North and South sections)
  - Chica beach
- Algeciras
  - Cala Arenas
  - Getares/San García beach
  - El Rinconcillo beach
- Los Barrios
  - Palmones beach
- La Línea de la Concepción
  - Poniente beach
  - Levante/Santa Barbara beach
  - La Atunara/De Levante beach
  - El Burgo/Torrenueva beach
  - La Hacienda beach
  - La Alcaidesa beach
- San Roque
  - Guadarranque beach
  - Campamento/Puente Mayorga beach
  - Torrecarbonera beach
  - Guadalquitón beach
  - Sotogrande beach
  - Torreguadiaro beach
  - El Cabrero/Cala Taraje beach

=== Huelva ===
La antilla İslantilla İsla cristina

=== Málaga ===
==== Costa del Sol ====
- Nerja
  - Playa de Carabeo
- Rincón de la Victoria
- Torremolinos
- Torrox
  - Playa de Ferrara
- Vélez-Málaga
  - Playa de Almayate
  - Playa de Benajarafe
  - Playa de Caleta
  - Playa de Chilches
  - Playa de Lagos
  - Playa de Torre del Mar
  - Playa del Hornillo

== Baleares ==
- Platja de Palma
- Es Trenc

== Cantabria ==
- Arnía
- Sardinero
- Magdalena

== Catalonia ==
=== Costa Brava ===
- Nova Icària Beach
- mugala beach
- Bogatell Beach
- Mar Bella Beach
- Nova Mar Bella Beach
- Santa Sussana Beach
- Lloret Beach
- Fenals Beach
- Aiguafreda Beach
- Pals Beach

== Canary Islands ==
Beaches in Canary Islands

=== Tenerife ===
- Playa de Las Teresitas

=== Fuerteventura ===
- Corralejo
- Morro Jable

== Galicia ==
- Porto Do Son
  - Arnela
  - Area Longa
  - O Dique
  - A Hierra
  - Sieras
  - Nadela
- Vigo
  - Samil

== Valencia ==
Alicante

  - Agua Amarga
  - Almadraba
  - Cabo de la Huerta
  - Cala Cantalar
  - Cala Sangueta
  - La Albufereta
  - Postiguet
  - Saladares
  - San Gabriel
  - San Juan
  - Tabarca Island

Altea

  - Bareta-Mascarat
  - Barra Grande
  - Cap Blanch
  - Cap Negret
  - La Roda
  - L’Espigó
  - La Roda
  - L’Espigó
  - L’Olla
  - Raco de Corb
  - Galera-Solsida

Benidorm

  - Almadrava
  - Levante
  - Mal Pas
  - Poniente
  - Tio Ximo
  - Benidorm Island

Benissa

  - Bassetes Bay
  - Cala Fustera
  - El Baladrar
  - Els Pinets
  - La Llobella
  - L’Advocat

Benitatxell

  - Cala Moraig
  - Llebeig
  - Testos

Calp (Calpe)

  - Arenal Bol
  - Cala Mallorqui
  - Cala Manzanera
  - Cala Morello
  - Calalga
  - Cantal Roig
  - Del Penyal
  - El Collao
  - El Racó
  - Gasparet
  - La Fossa – Levante
  - Les Bassetes
  - Les Urques
  - Puerto Blanco

Dénia

  - Albaranes
  - Almadrava
  - Arenetes
  - El Trampolí
  - Els Molins
  - La Cala
  - Les Bovetes
  - Les Deveses
  - Les Marines
  - Marineta Casiana
  - Punta Negra
  - Punta Raset

El Campello

  - Barranc d’Aigües
  - Cala Baeza
  - Cala Carritxal
  - Cala d’Enmig
  - Cala Lanuza
  - Cala Nostra
  - Cala Piteres
  - Carrer de la Mar
  - Illeta dels Banyets
  - L’Almadrava
  - L’Almerador
  - Les Palmeretes
  - Lloma de Reixes
  - Llop Marí
  - Morro Blanc
  - Muchavista
  - Punta del Riu

Elx (Elche)

  - Arenales del Sol
  - Carabassí
  - El Altet
  - El Pinet
  - La Marina
  - Les Pesqueres-Rebollo

Finestrat

  - La Cala

Guardamar Del Segura

  - Babilònia
  - El Camp
  - El Moncaio
  - Els Tossals
  - Els Vivers
  - Guardamar Centre
  - La Roqueta
  - Les Ortigues
- L'Alfás Del Pí
  - Cala Amerador
  - Cala de la Mina
  - Cala Metge
  - Racó de l’Albir

La Vila Joiosa (Villajoyosa)

  - Bol Nou
  - Cala Fonda
  - Carritxal
  - El Torres
  - Estudiants
  - La Caleta
  - L’Esparrelló
  - Paradís
  - Puntes del Morro
  - Racó del Conill
  - Tio Roig
  - Varadero
  - Vila Joiosa Centre
  - Xarco

Orihuela Costa

  - Aguamarina
  - Barranco Rubio
  - Cabo Roig -Cala Capitán
  - Cabo Roig -La Caleta
  - Calas Cabo Peñas
  - Campoamor -La Glea
  - La Zenia -Cala Bosque
  - La Zenia -Cala Cerrada
  - Mil Palmeras
  - Playa Flamenca -Cala Estaca
  - Playa Flamenca -Cala Mosca
  - Punta Prima

Pilar de la Horadada

  - El Conde
  - El Mojón
  - El Puerto
  - El Río
  - Las Higuericas
  - Las Villas
  - Los Jesuitas
  - Mil Palmeras
  - Rocamar Coves
  - Vistamar

Santa Pola

  - Bancal de L’Arena
  - Bernabeu Coves
  - Calas del Este
  - Caleta Gossets
  - Cuartel Coves
  - Gran Playa
  - La Ermita
  - La Gola
  - L’Aljub Coves
  - Llevant
  - Playa Lisa
  - Tamarit
  - Varadero

Teulada-Moraira

  - Cala Blanc
  - El Portet
  - L´Ampolla
  - L´Andragó
  - Les Platgetes
  - Portitxolet

Torrevieja

  - Acequion
  - Cabo Cervera
  - Cala Ferris
  - Cala Piteras
  - Cala Rocío de Mar
  - El Cura
  - La Mata
  - Las Calas
  - Las Piscinas
  - Los Locos
  - Los Náufragos

Valencia

- Costa de Valencia:
  - Playa de las Arenas
  - Playa de la Malvarrosa
  - Playa de Pinedo
  - Playa de l'Arbre del Gos
  - Playa del Saler
  - Playa de la Devesa
  - Playa Recatí

Xàbia (Jávea)

  - Ambolo
  - Barraca (Portitxol)
  - Benissero
  - Cala Blanca
  - Cala Granadella
  - Cala Sardinera
  - El Arenal
  - La Grava
  - Muntanyar

== See also ==
- List of beaches in Menorca
- List of beaches
