= Beaches in Ferrol, Spain =

Doninos, Esmelle and St. George's Beach are beaches in Ferrol, Spain. Ferrol is privileged to have, within its borders, several high quality gorgeous sandy beaches that are ideal for practising water sports such as windsurfing, kayaking, boogie board, kite surfing, and surfing. These beaches are also suitable for more relaxing endeavours such as walking in the dunes, or sun bathing. Other activities like Bisolvon Ritual Nights were performed during the last decade.

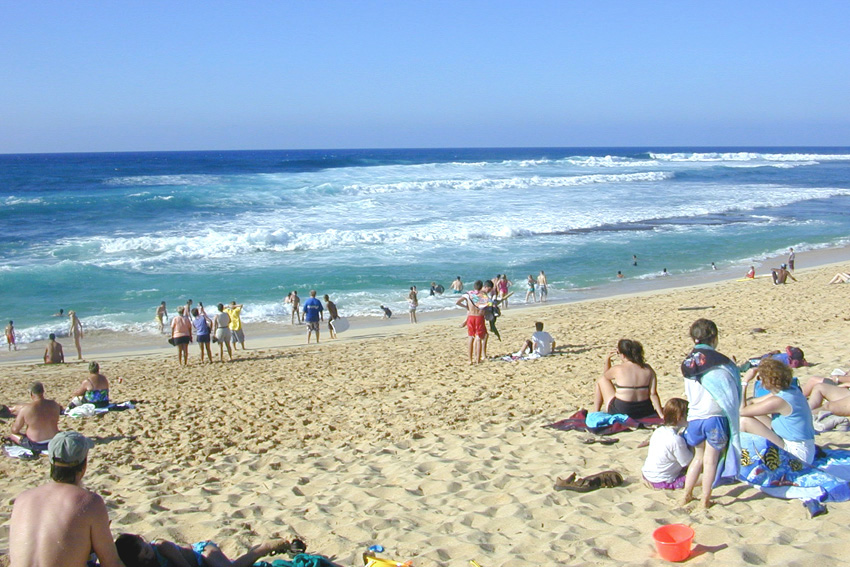
A sunny day in one of the beaches

The best known beaches from Northwest to Southwest:

1. Ponzos' Beach
2. Saint Comba's Beach (also "Santa Comba")
3. Saint George's Beach (also "San Xurxo")
4. Esmelle's Beach
5. Donino's Beach (also "Doniños")
6. O Vilar's Beach
7. The Frigate's Beach (also "A Fragata")
8. A Grana's Beach (also "A Graña")
9. Caranza's Beach

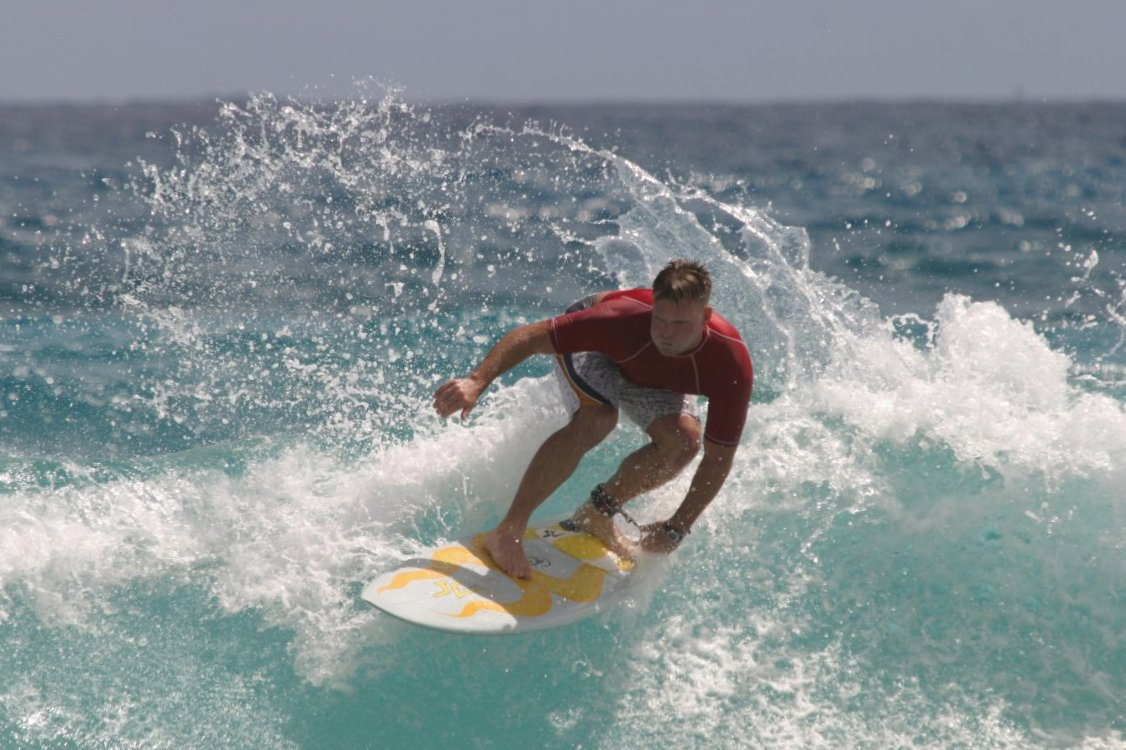
Doninos' Beach in ferrolterra is an ideal place for Surf

== See also ==
- Ferrol—city and naval station in North-western Spain
- The Ferrolterra Pantin Classic—annual international surf competition on the beach of Pantin in Valdoviño, Ferrolterra, North-western Spain.
- List of beaches in Spain
- List of beaches in Minorca
- List of beaches
