= Ciutadella =

Ciutadella (Catalan: citadel) is a common place name in Catalan-speaking areas.

== Ciutadella de Menorca ==
- Ciutadella de Menorca, a municipality on Menorca
  - Ciutadella de Menorca Cathedral
  - Ciutadella Lighthouse
  - Atlètic de Ciutadella, the city's football club
  - CV Ciutadella, the city's volleyball club
  - Port of Ciutadella

== In Catalonia ==
=== Barcelona ===
- Parc de la Ciutadella, a park in Barcelona
- Ciutadella – Vila Olímpica (Barcelona Metro)

=== Girona ===
- Ciutadella de Roses
