= Porto Pí Lighthouse =

Lighthouse on Mallorca, Spain

Porto Pí Lighthouse Palma de Mallorca Torre Senyals
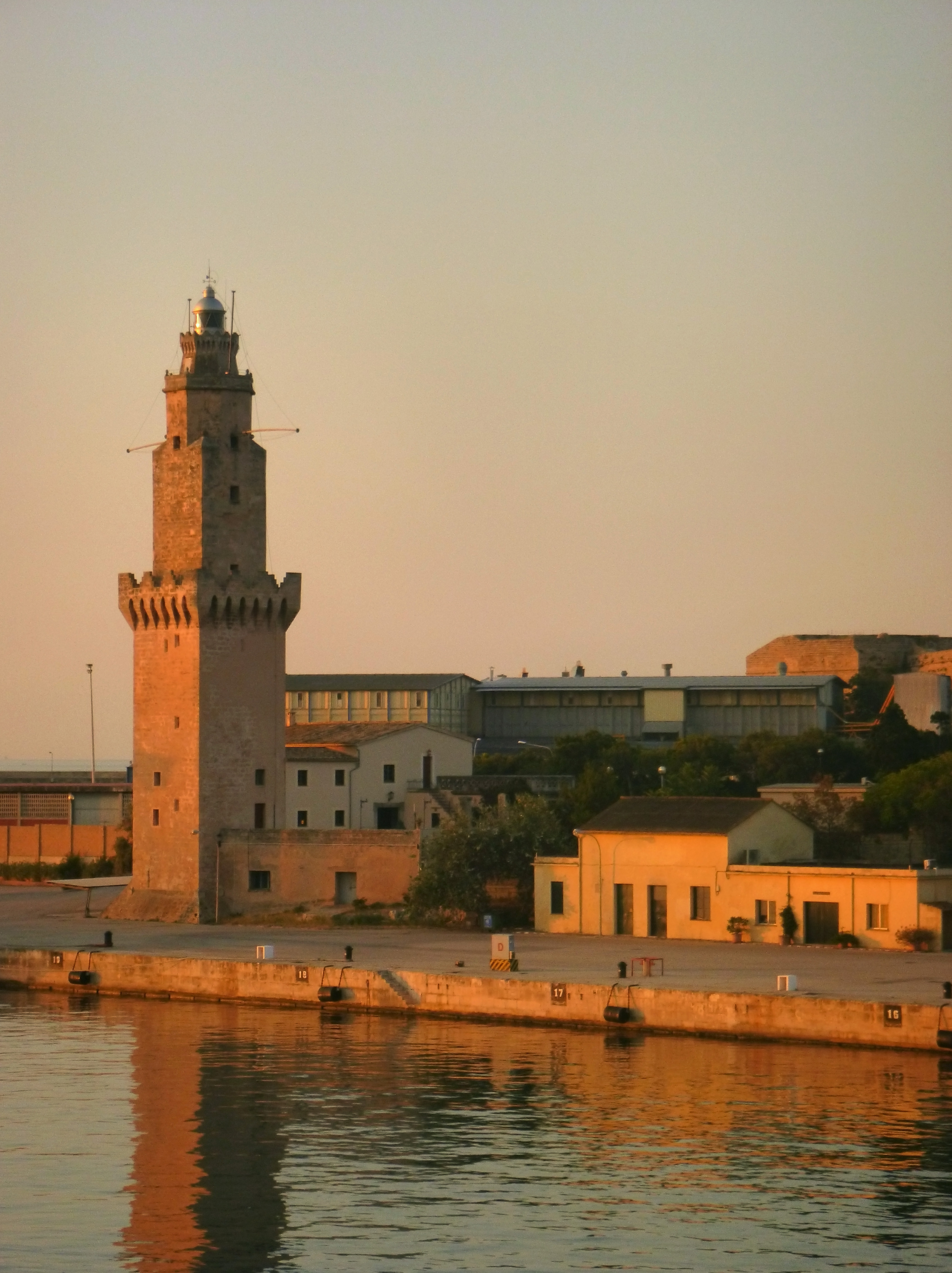
- Location: Palma; Majorca; Spain
- Coordinates: 39.54865°N 2.62365°E

Tower
- Constructed: c. 1300, 13th century
- Construction: stone
- Height: 38 metres (125 ft)
- Shape: three-stage square tower with three balconies and lantern
- Markings: unpainted stone tower, grey lantern
- Power source: mains electricity
- Operator: Comisión de faros
- Heritage: Bien de Interés Cultural

Light
- First lit: 1617
- Focal height: 41 metres (135 ft)
- Range: 18 nautical miles (33 km; 21 mi)
- Characteristic: Fl (2) W 15s.
- Spain no.: ES-34500

The Porto Pí Lighthouse is one of the oldest operating lighthouses in the world, and a historic monument. It is located in Palma harbour on the Balearic Island of Majorca.

== See also ==
- List of lighthouses in Spain
- List of lighthouses in the Balearic Islands
