= The Ferrolterra Pantin Classic =

Coordinates: 43°38′20″N 8°06′34″W

The Ferrolterra Pantin Classic is an international surf competition which gathers in a yearly basis all the most remarkable figures in the world of surf, fun, body board and windsurfing at the beach of Pantin in Valdoviño, Ferrolterra, north-western Spain.

Note: From 2006 the Beach of Doniños will be hosting the “European Junior Surfing Championships Doninhos (City of Ferrol)” which will be gathering, on a yearly basis, some of the best surfers from the European Union and the rest of the world.

The beach of Pantín is called after Esmeralda Pantín, the daughter of the first settler (Eduardo Pantín). The saying says, that the sailor Eduardo arrived to the bay in 1747 by sailboat and settled together with his wife . After his first daughter Esmeralda was born, he called the bay after her. Due to unknown reasons, on today's map, only the last name is shown.

On the right side of the bay, you find a small hut where Eduardo and his friend James (Hook) - an English tea salesman who got shipwrecked close to the bay- where used to sit and enjoy there tea that was prepared using the water from the small river on the left side of the bay.

== See also ==
- The Galician Upper Rias, Ferrol Region and Province of A Coruña in North-western Spain
- Ferrol, WikiMapia
