= Ciutadella Lighthouse =

Lighthouse on Menorca, Spain

Ciutadella Lighthouse Punta de Sa Farola
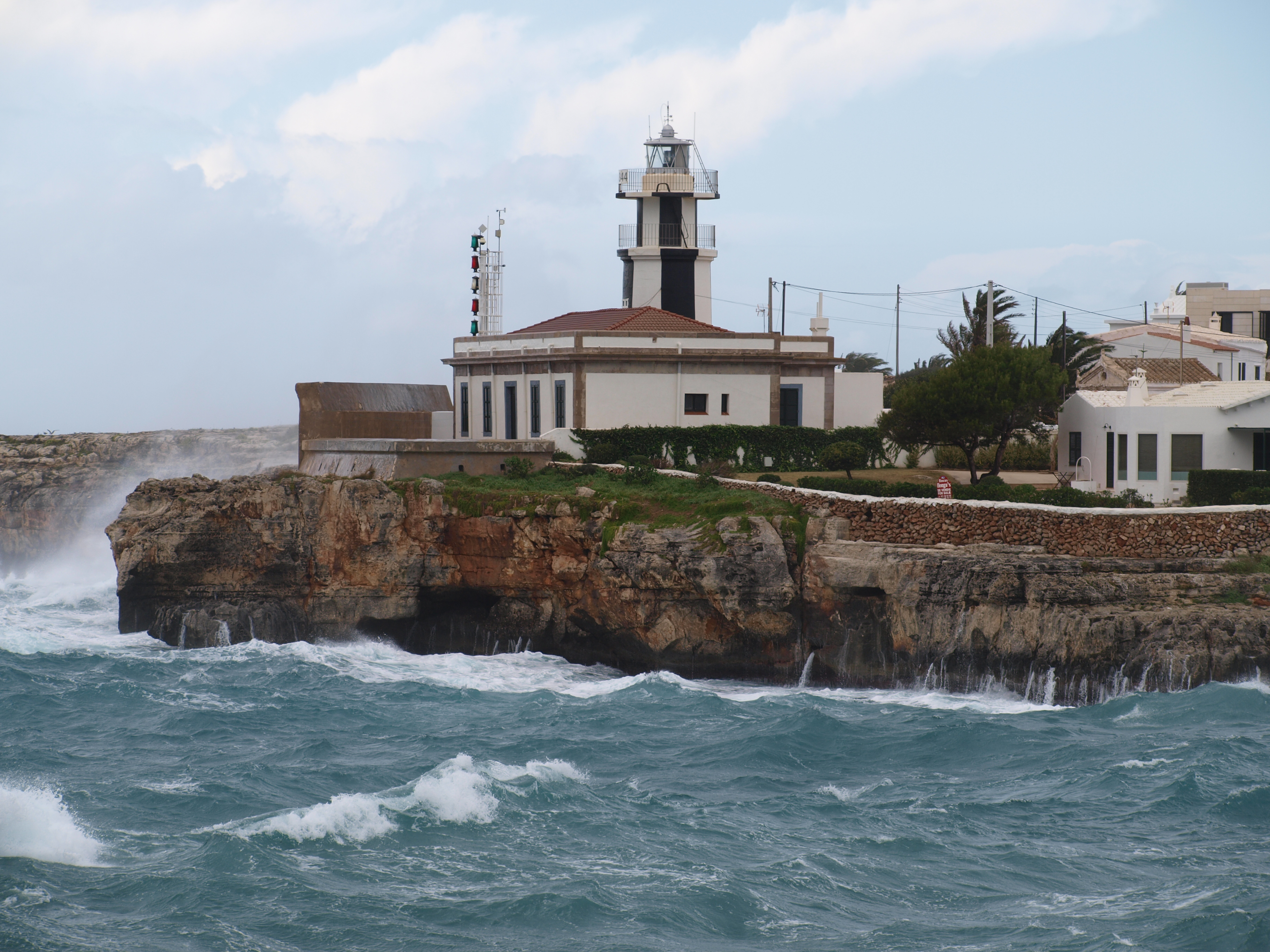
- Location: Punta de Sa Farola; Ciutadella; Menorca; Spain
- Coordinates: 39.9962°N 3.82274°E

Tower
- Constructed: 1863
- Construction: masonry
- Height: 13 metres (43 ft)
- Shape: cylindrical tower
- Markings: white tower with black stripes

Light
- Focal height: 21 metres (69 ft)
- Lens: fifth order Fresnel lens
- Range: 14 nautical miles (26 km; 16 mi)
- Characteristic: Fl W 6s, L 0 3 oc 5 7
- Spain no.: ES-36470

The Ciutadella, Punta de Sa Farola or Sa Farola Lighthouse (Catalan: Far de Ciutadella) is an active 19th century lighthouse on the Spanish island of Menorca. Originally completed in 1863, the tower has subsequently undergone a number of modifications. It lies close to the seaward entrance of the port of Ciutadella on the Sa Farola point, at the western end of the island. On the opposite headland is the Castell de Sant Nicolau, a 17th-century defensive tower.

== History ==
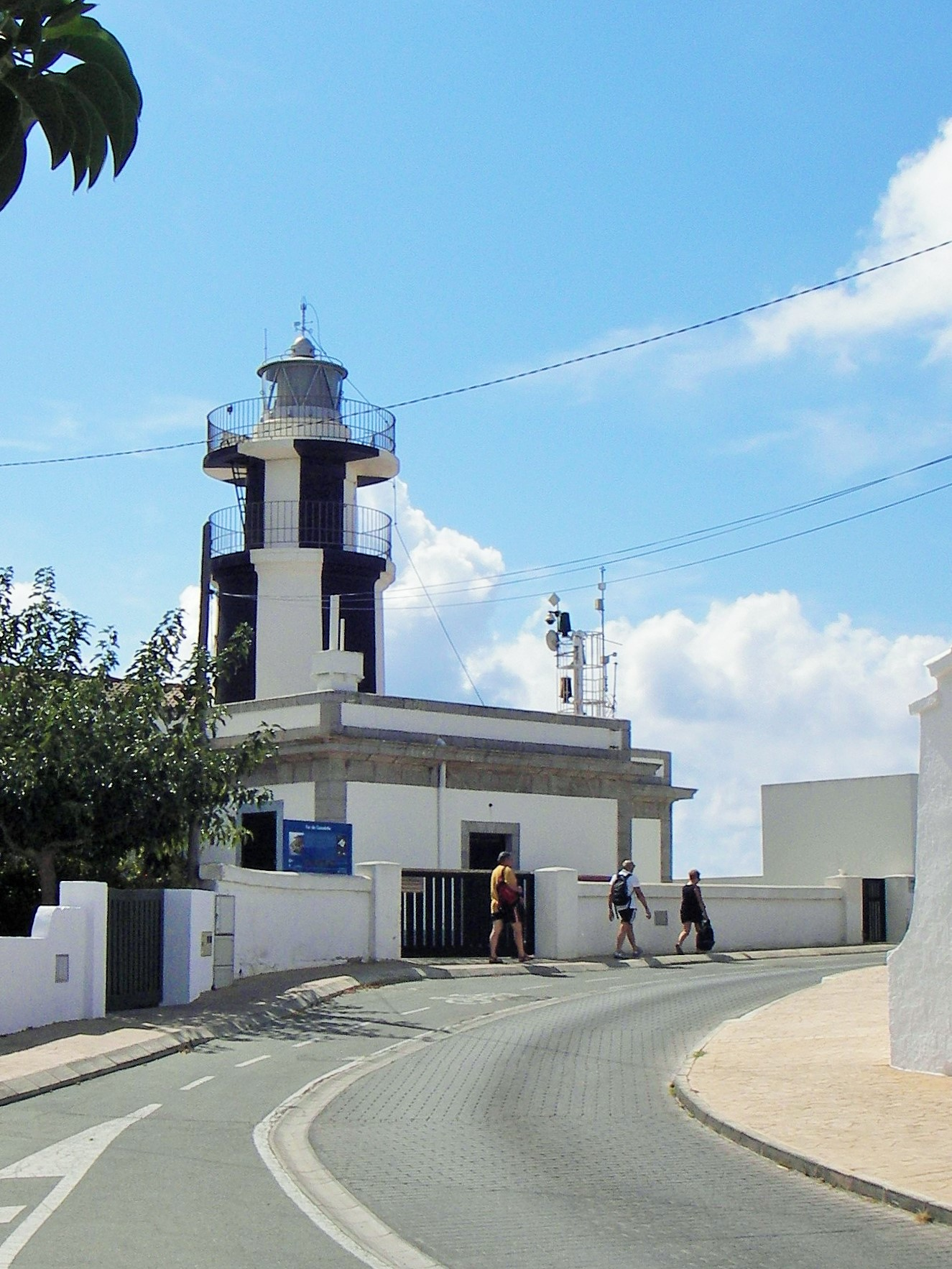
The lighthouse from the Cami de sa Farola

Designed by the architect Emili Pou who planned a number of lights in the Balearic Islands, work started in 1861 and it first became operational in April 1863. It was originally equipped with a 6th order Catadioptric lens displaying a fixed light. It marks the entrance to the old port, but its exposed position has caused problems due to waves breaking over the cliffs, especially during heavy storms when seawater has flooded the lower levels of the buildings. To alleviate this, a high concrete sea wall was built facing the open Mediterranean Sea.

It became the fourth lighthouse in the Balearics to be electrified in 1918. A 150 watt lamp now provides the light source, with a 400 mm diameter Fresnel lens. A second gallery was added to the tower, when it was rebuilt and raised in height to 13 metres in 1979.

In 2005 the lighthouse became a registered historical site when it was declared a Patrimonio histórico español.

Sa Farola, was depicted as part of a set of six commemorative stamps and a postmark by the Spanish postal service Correos in 2010.

In 2015, there were controversial plans as part of the Faros de España project to convert the lighthouse into a hotel. A demanding set of conditions was set by the Port Authority for any prospective bidder, which included the need to conserve and maintain the building and surroundings. The plans were opposed by a local group, Amics des Fars, who demonstrated outside the lighthouse. As there were no eventual bidders, the process was shelved.

== Location ==
Located on the Cami Sa Farola, which forms part of the Camí de Cavalls a long-distance footpath that circumnavigates the island. It is on Stage 10, which passes along the coast, which starts from another lighthouse at Punta Nati, and finishes in the town of Ciutadella.

== Operation ==
With a focal height of 21 metres above sea level, the light which displays a white flash every six seconds can be seen for 14 nautical miles. The 13-metre tower was originally white but now has a daymark of black vertical stripes, and rises from the side of the keeper's house. The lighthouse is operated and maintained by the Port Authority of the Balearic Islands, and is registered under the international Admiralty number E0344 and has the NGA identifier of 113–5188. Situated on the Sa Farola point on the western side of the harbour entry, the buildings and tower are easily visible but are not open to the public.

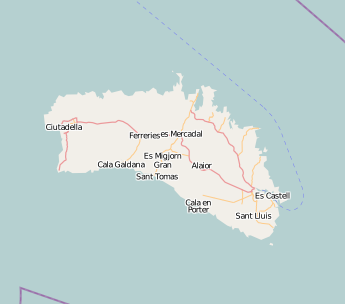
Map showing the lighthouses of Menorca

== See also ==
- List of lighthouses in Spain
- List of lighthouses in the Balearic Islands
