= Illa de l'Aire Lighthouse =

Lighthouse on Menorca, Spain

Illa de l'Aire Lighthouse Isla del Aire Punta Prima
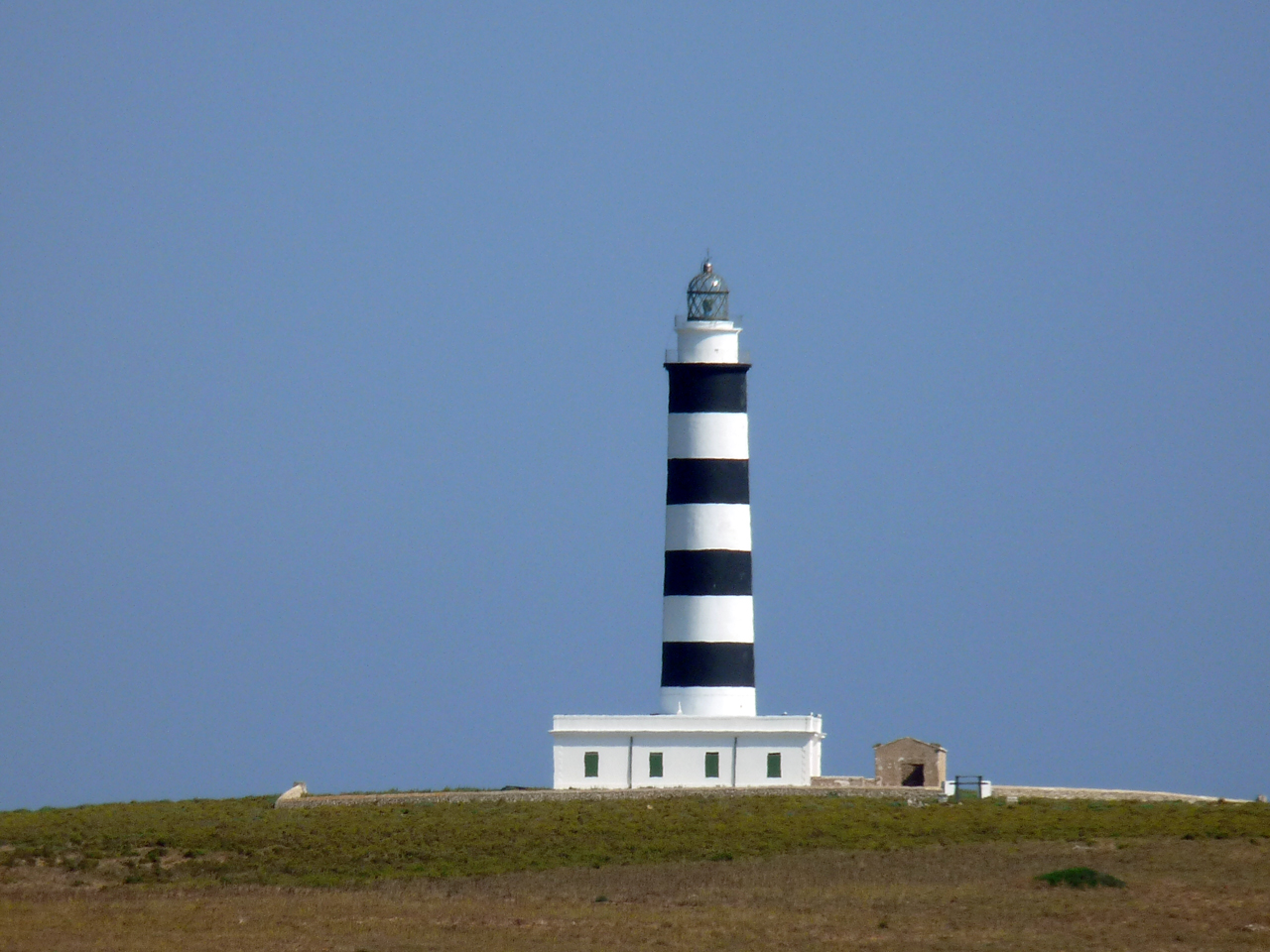
- Location: Illa de l'Aire; Menorca; Spain
- Coordinates: 39.799504°N 4.293067°E

Tower
- Constructed: 1860
- Construction: masonry tower
- Height: 38 metres (125 ft)
- Shape: cylindrical tower with double balcony and lantern
- Markings: tower with black and white bands, grey lantern
- Power source: solar power
- Operator: Comisión de faros

Light
- Focal height: 53 metres (174 ft)
- Range: 18 nautical miles (33 km; 21 mi)
- Characteristic: Fl W 5s
- Spain no.: ES-36370

The Illa de l’Aire Lighthouse is an active lighthouse on the islet of Illa de l'Aire, on the southeast coast of the Spanish island of Menorca.

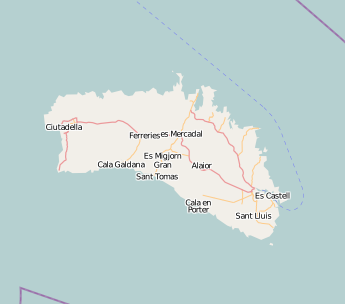
Map showing the lighthouses of Menorca

== See also ==
- List of lighthouses in Spain
- List of lighthouses in the Balearic Islands
