= Cap d'Artrutx Lighthouse =

Lighthouse on Menorca, Spain

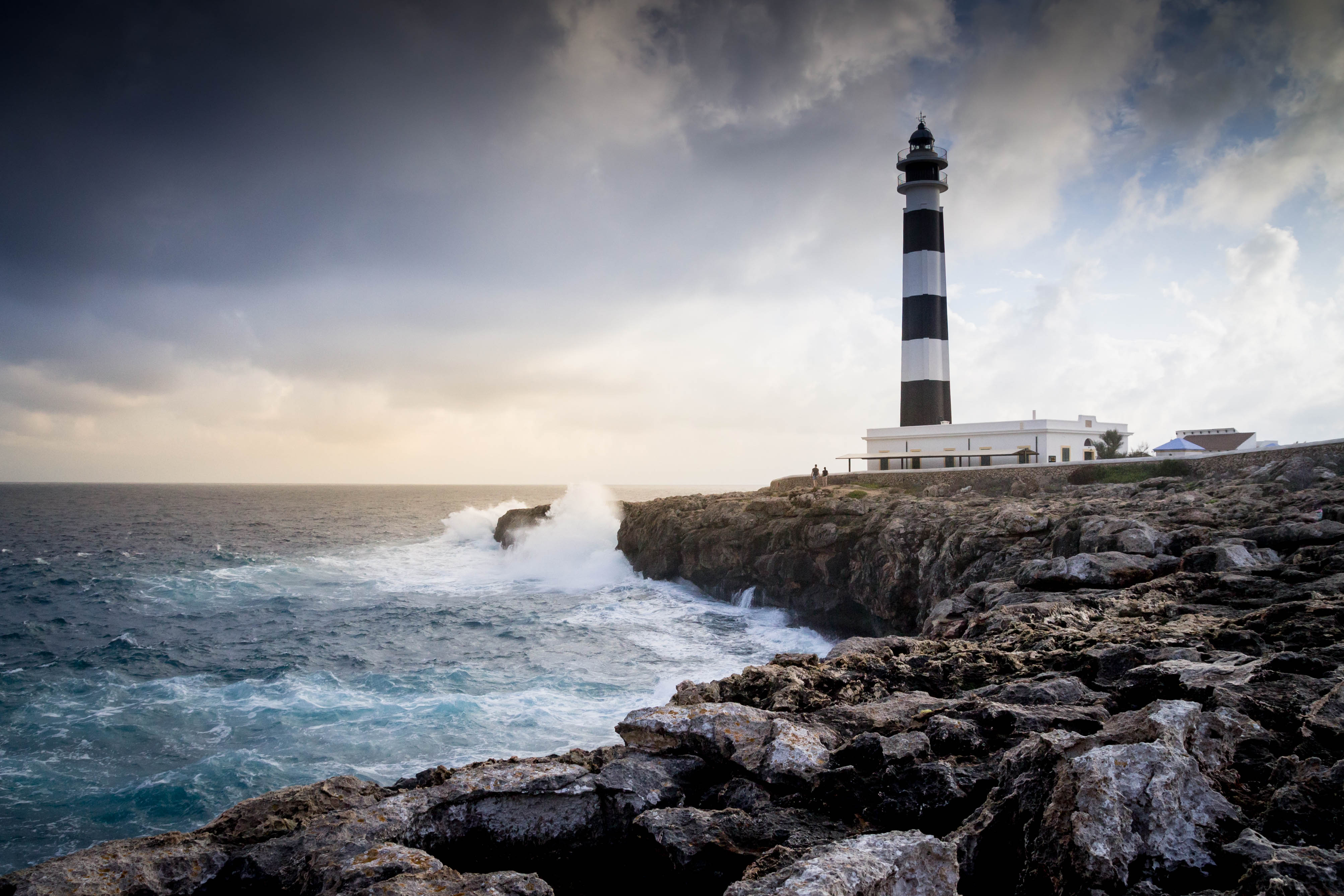
- Location: Cap d'Artrutx; Menorca; Balearic Islands; Spain
- Coordinates: 39.922532°N 3.824190°E

Tower
- Constructed: 1859
- Height: 34 metres (112 ft)
- Shape: cylindrical tower with buttresses, double balcony and lantern
- Markings: white tower with black bands
- Heritage: bien de interés cultural

Light
- Focal height: 45 metres (148 ft)
- Range: 18 nautical miles (33 km; 21 mi)
- Characteristic: Fl(3) W 10s.
- Spain no.: ES-36420

The Cap d'Artrutx Lighthouse or Artrutx Lighthouse (Catalan: Far d'Artrutx) is an active 19th century lighthouse on the low-lying headland of the same name on the Spanish island of Menorca. It was completed in 1859 but the tower was significantly increased in height in 1969. Automated in 1980, the keeper's accommodation is now used as a restaurant.

== Cap d'Artrutx ==
Cap d'Artrutx is a headland at the extreme south-western point of the island, which gives it name to the surrounding urbanisation made up of modern villas and apartments. Adjacent to the larger resort of Cala en Bosch which lies to the east, it is connected to the rest of the island by the Me 24 road. The area is also served by a regular bus service to the nearby town of Ciutadella. The Camí de Cavalls a long distance footpath that circumnavigates the island, passes along the coast to the cape. It marks the end of the stage from Ciutadella and the start of the next section to Cala en Turqueta.

== History ==
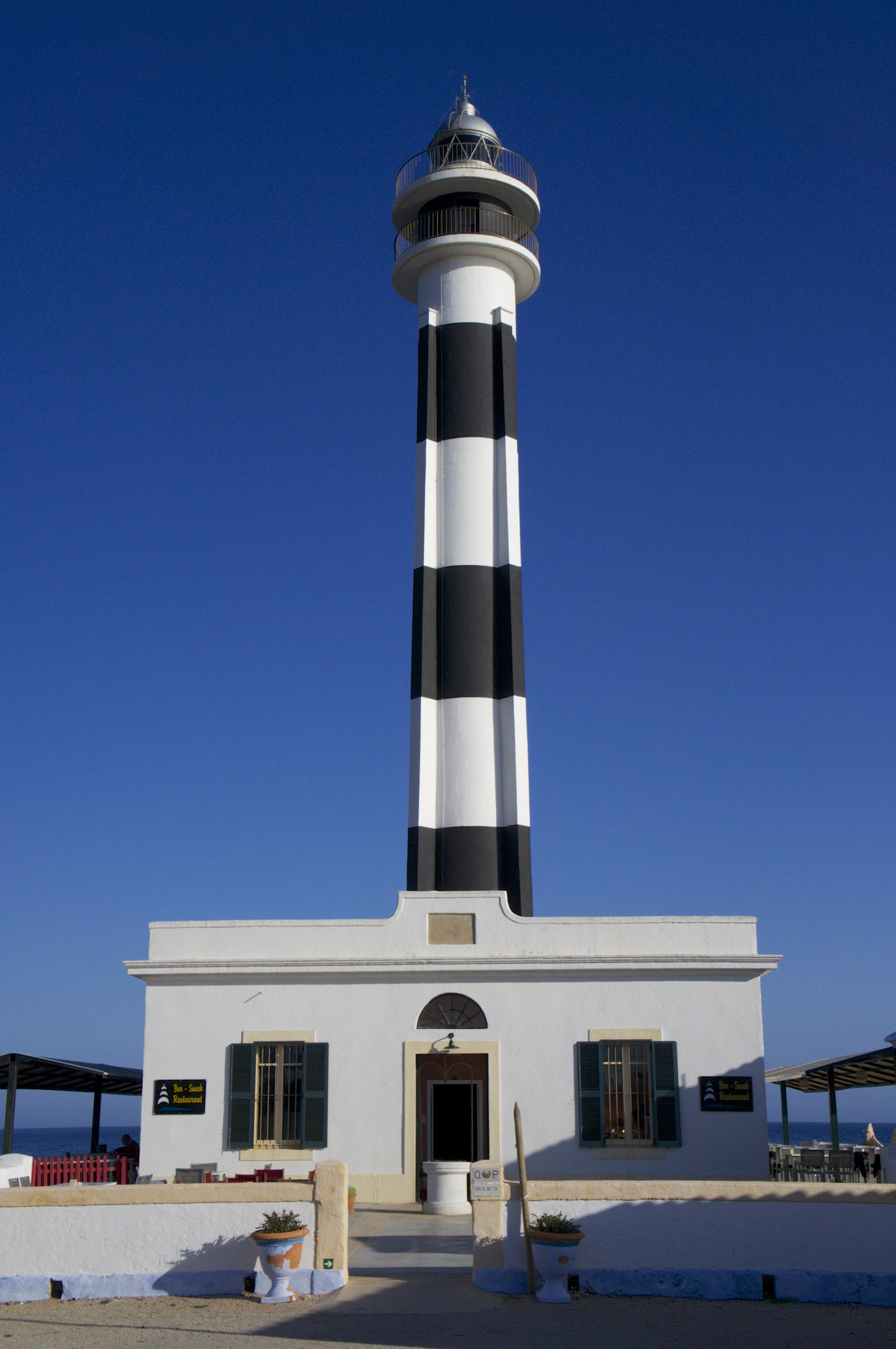
Detail of the tower

Designed by the architect Emili Pou who planned a number of lights in the Balearic Islands. It became operational in July 1859, and was equipped with a 4th order Fresnel lens. The optics were supplied by Henry Lapute of Paris at a cost of 3,250 francs.

The original tower was much shorter than that seen today, with a height of only 17 metres. Reverberations from waves entering a sea cave nearby caused problems within the lighthouse producing "tremors in the building and panes of glass in the lantern to shatter". In 1967, a new maritime lighting plan for the Balearics was drawn up which outlined the need for a higher tower at Artrutx. When the new tower was constructed in 1969, the 34-metre-high (112 ft) cylindrical structure was built with four buttresses or ribs, giving the light a unique shape in comparison to others in the archipelago.

With the automation of the lighthouse in 1980, the unused keeper's accommodation was later converted into a bar and restaurant, providing food and drink to patrons who visit to watch the sunset on the terrace. The lighthouse can be visited when the restaurant is open, but the tower is closed.

In 2005 the lighthouse became a registered historical site when it was declared a Patrimonio histórico español.

== Operation ==
With a focal height of 45 metres above sea level, the light which displays a pattern of three white flashes every 10 seconds can be seen for 18 nautical miles. It marks the eastern side of the Menorca Channel, a strait that separates Majorca and Menorca. On the opposite side of the channel is another 19th-century lighthouse, at Capdepera, which was also designed by Emili Pou.

The lighthouse is operated and maintained by the Port Authority of the Balearic Islands, and is registered under the international Admiralty number E0342 and has the NGA identifier of 113-5184.

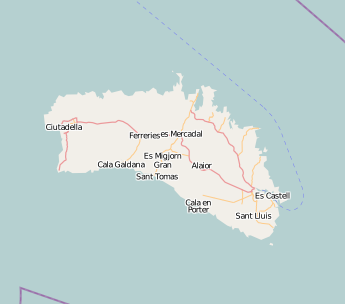
Map showing the lighthouses of Menorca

== See also ==
- List of lighthouses in Spain
- List of lighthouses in the Balearic Islands
