= Punta Nati Lighthouse =

Lighthouse on the island of Menorca, Spain

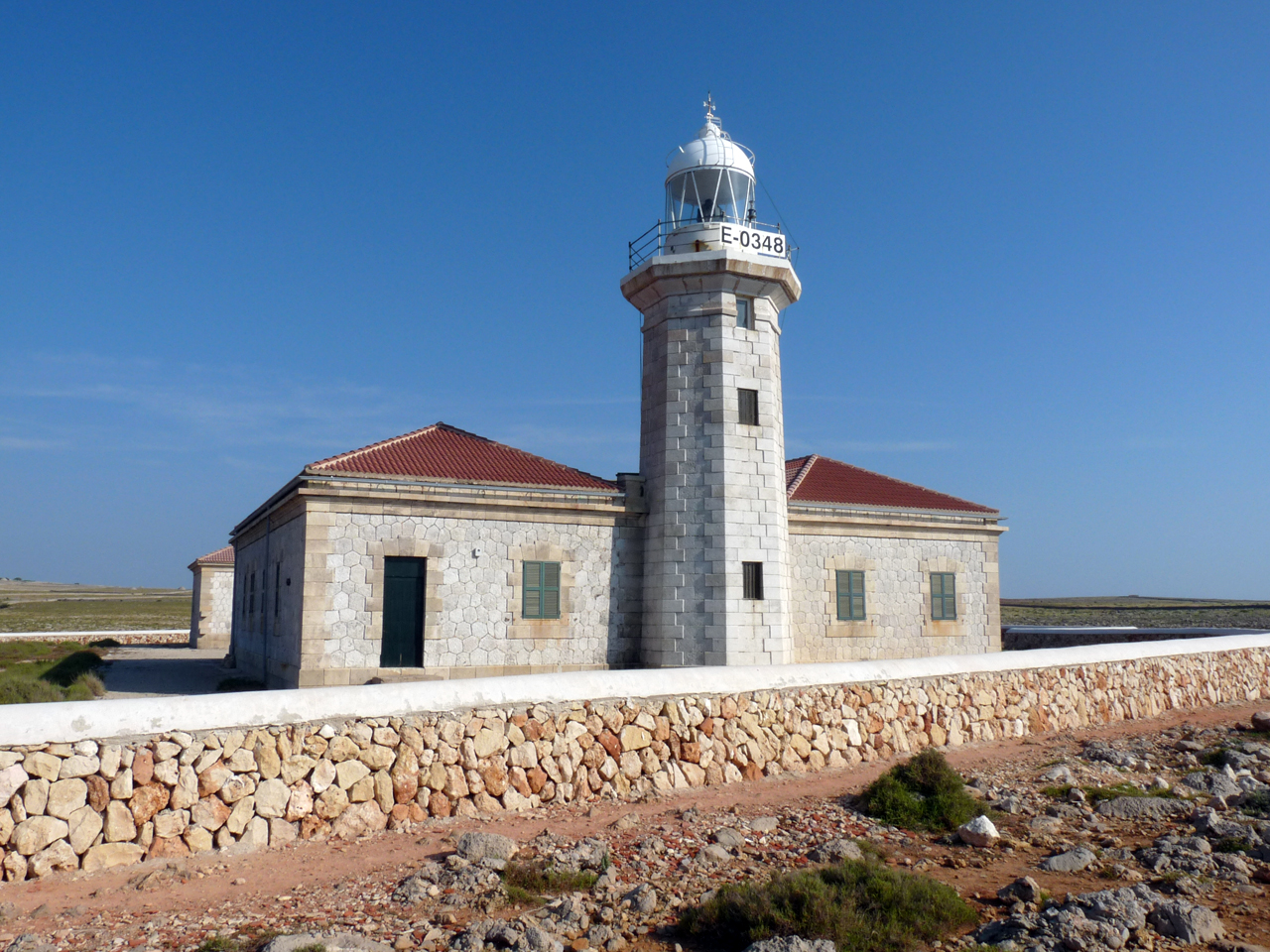
- Location: Punta Nati; Menorca; Spain
- Coordinates: 40.050229°N 3.823542°E

Tower
- Constructed: 1913
- Construction: stone
- Height: 19 metres (62 ft)
- Shape: octagonal stone tower with balcony and lantern
- Power source: mains electricity

Light
- Focal height: 42 metres (138 ft)
- Range: 18 nautical miles (33 km; 21 mi)
- Characteristic: Fl (3+1) W 20s.

The Punta Nati Lighthouse is an active aid to navigation located on the rocky north western coast of the Spanish island of Menorca.

The lighthouse was built following demands from the French authorities to light the northern coast of the island. This was primarily in response to the sinking of the French steamship Général Chanzy nearby in 1910, during which 156 passengers and crew lost their lives. Designed by the engineer Mauro Serret, Punta Nati was constructed rapidly in just over a year, it became operational in 1913, and was fully completed in 1914.

The loss of the Général Chanzy was the catalyst for building the light, but a number of other shipwrecks had also occurred in the area despite the presence of the lighthouse at Cavalleria, which was completed in 1857. Construction of a third lighthouse on the northern coast at Favàritx began in 1917, which was also designed by Serret.

== Loss of the Général Chanzy ==
Named after the famous French general Antoine Chanzy, the steamship was a packet boat that sailed a regular route from Marseille to Algiers, and was part of the CGT or French line. It left the French port of Marseille on the 9 February 1910, but was caught in a storm whilst passing through the Menorca straight. Due to the poor conditions many passengers came on deck including Marcel Bodez (Note: Also reported as Marcel Badez) a French customs clerk who was the only survivor. He jumped overboard wearing a lifejacket when the ship struck rocks, and witnessed the loss of the ship when it broke up as a result of the boilers exploding.

Washed against the foot of a steep cliff, the injured Bodez found a cave in which to shelter as the flotsam from the wreck came ashore. By the next day the storm had subsided enough that he was able to climb the steep cliffs and made his way inland until he found a local islander. Unable to converse due to the language difference, he had to explain it through drawings using charcoal. He was then taken to the nearby town of Ciutadella to recuperate, from where a recovery operation was initiated to retrieve the many bodies of those drowned in the disaster that had come ashore.

== Memorials ==
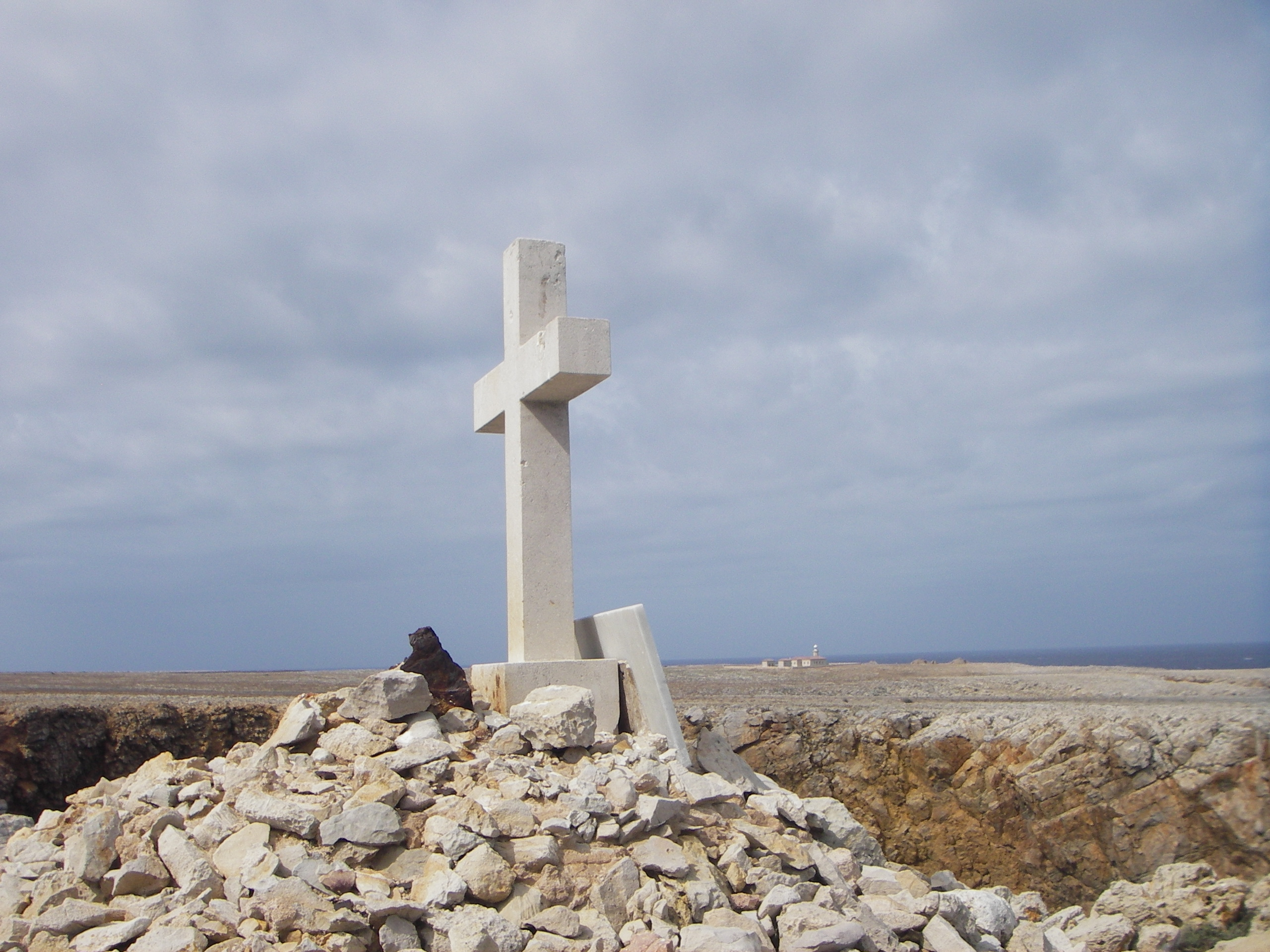
Memorial stone cross with the lighthouse on the horizon

There are a number of memorials commemorating the loss of the General Chanzy, one is a simple cross on top of a cairn not far from the lighthouse.

Located within the old cemetery in Ciutadella, is another more elaborate memorial. Completed in 1911, it features a large statue of an angel with a stone plaque depicting the ship. It was funded by donations from the people of Menorca and the CGT shipping company. In 1917, the remains of twelve unidentified victims were interred in the cemetery.

A third memorial was built in the grounds of Chateau Danem, designed by the architect Georges Wybo it commemorates the loss of a number of French cabaret artists who were victims of the shipwreck.

== Operation ==
The lighthouse has a 19-metre-high (62 ft) stone tower, flanked by two keepers’ houses, set within a walled compound. With a focal height of 42 metres above sea level, the light which displays a three plus one pattern of white flashes in 20 seconds has a nominal range of 18 nautical miles.

It marks the eastern side of the Menorca Channel, a strait that separates Majorca and Menorca. The rocky northern coast of Menorca has been the site of many shipwrecks, these losses continuing despite the construction of the Cavalleria Lighthouse in 1857. Although the loss of the General Chanzy was the spur for the lighthouse, other wrecks of that time included the Ville de Rome in 1898 and the Isaac Pereire in 1906, both of which also belonged to the CGT line.

The lighthouse is operated and maintained by the Port Authority of the Balearic Islands, and is registered under the international Admiralty number E0348 and has the NGA identifier of 113–5220.

== Location ==
The Camí de Cavalls a long-distance footpath that circumnavigates the island, passes along the coast near to the lighthouse. It marks the end of the stage from Ciutadella and the start of the next section to Cala Morell. Close to where the path crosses the road to the lighthouse, a car park has been built. Visitors can then walk 1 km towards the lighthouse, although the tower and compound are not accessible to the public

Adjacent to the lighthouse, overlooking the sea, is a cluster of defensive bunkers from the Spanish Civil War, which have been constructed in the form of sheep refuges or barracas.

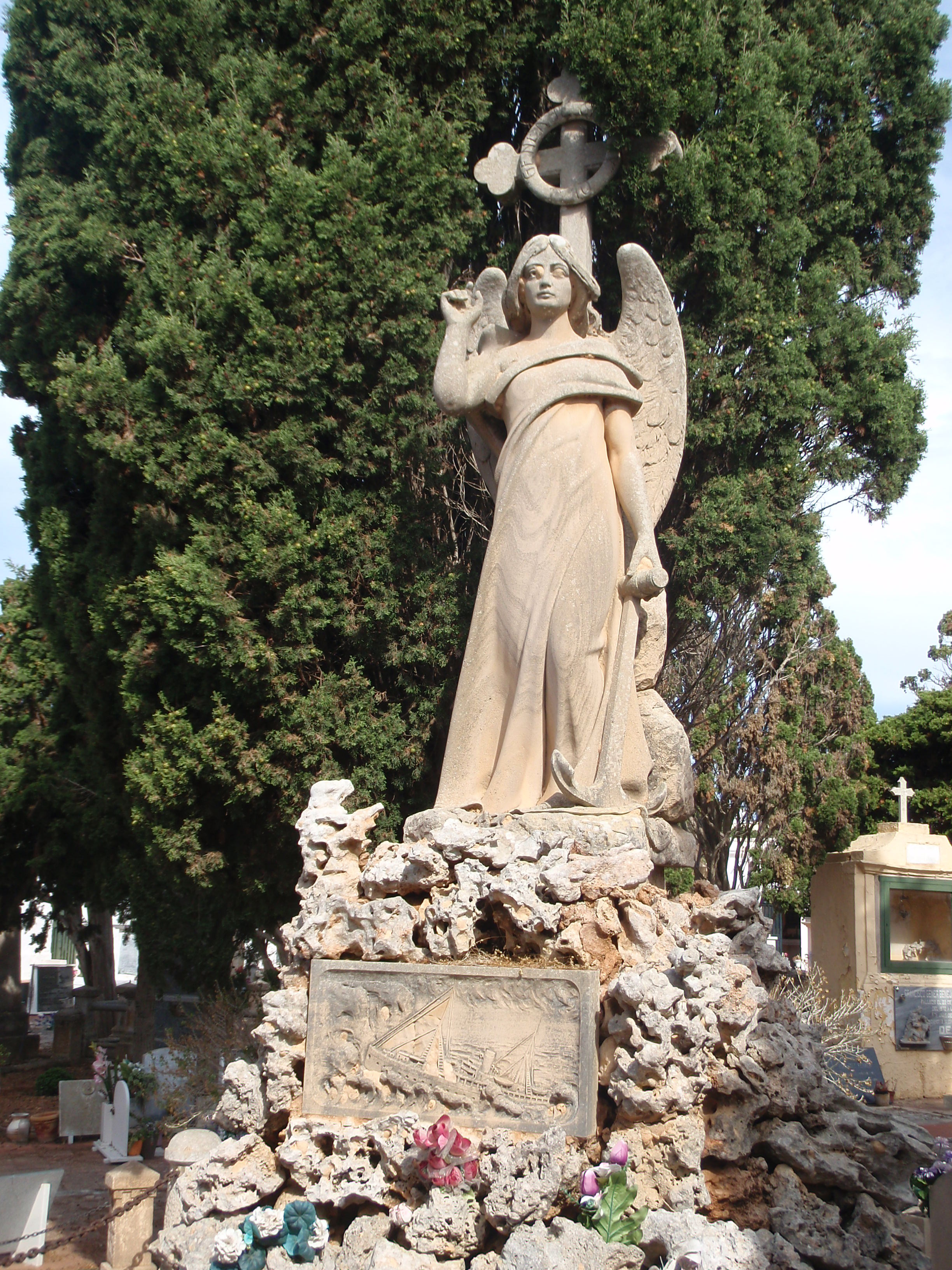
Général Chanzy Memorial in the old Ciutadella cemetery

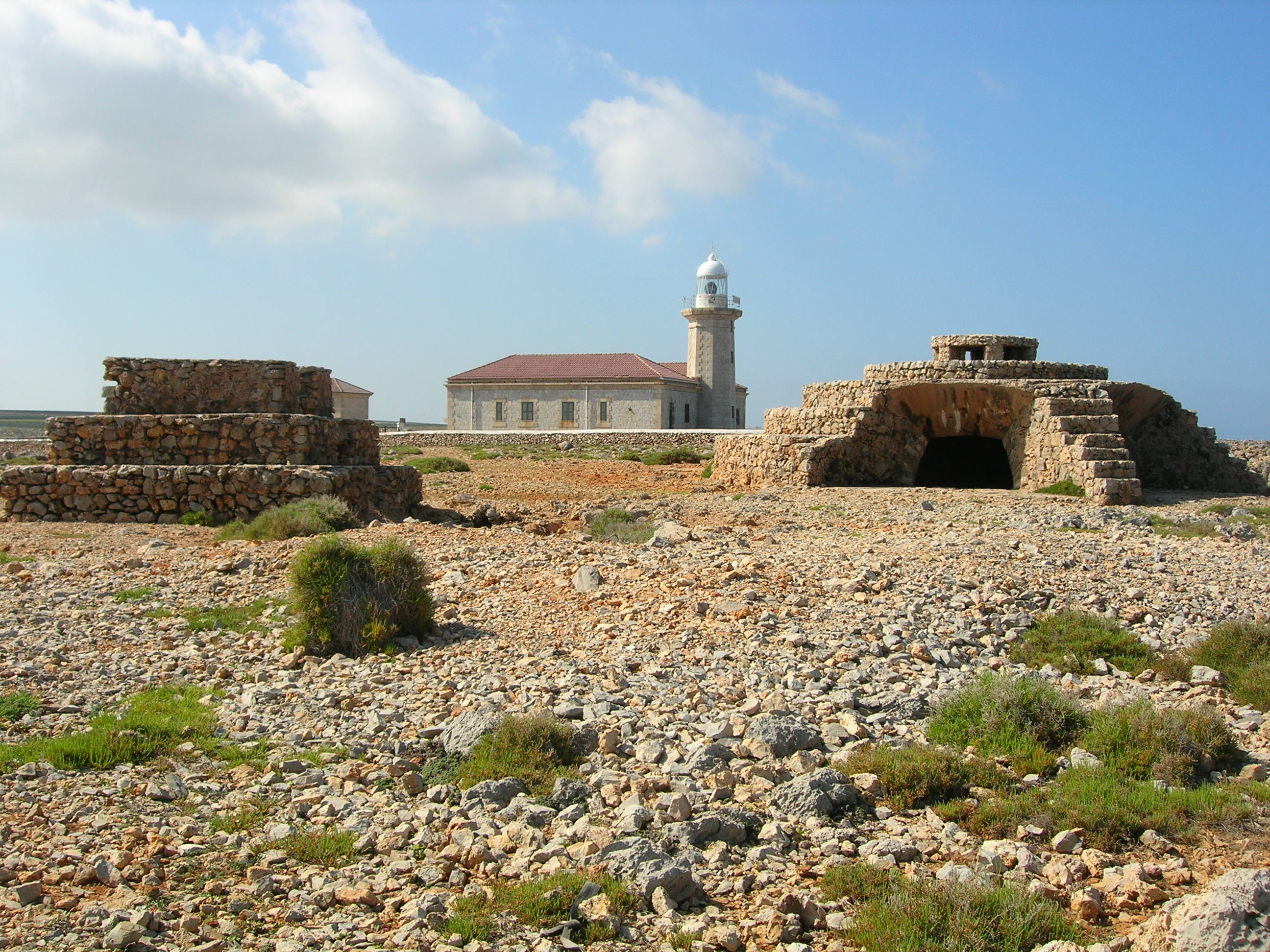
View of the bunkers and lighthouse

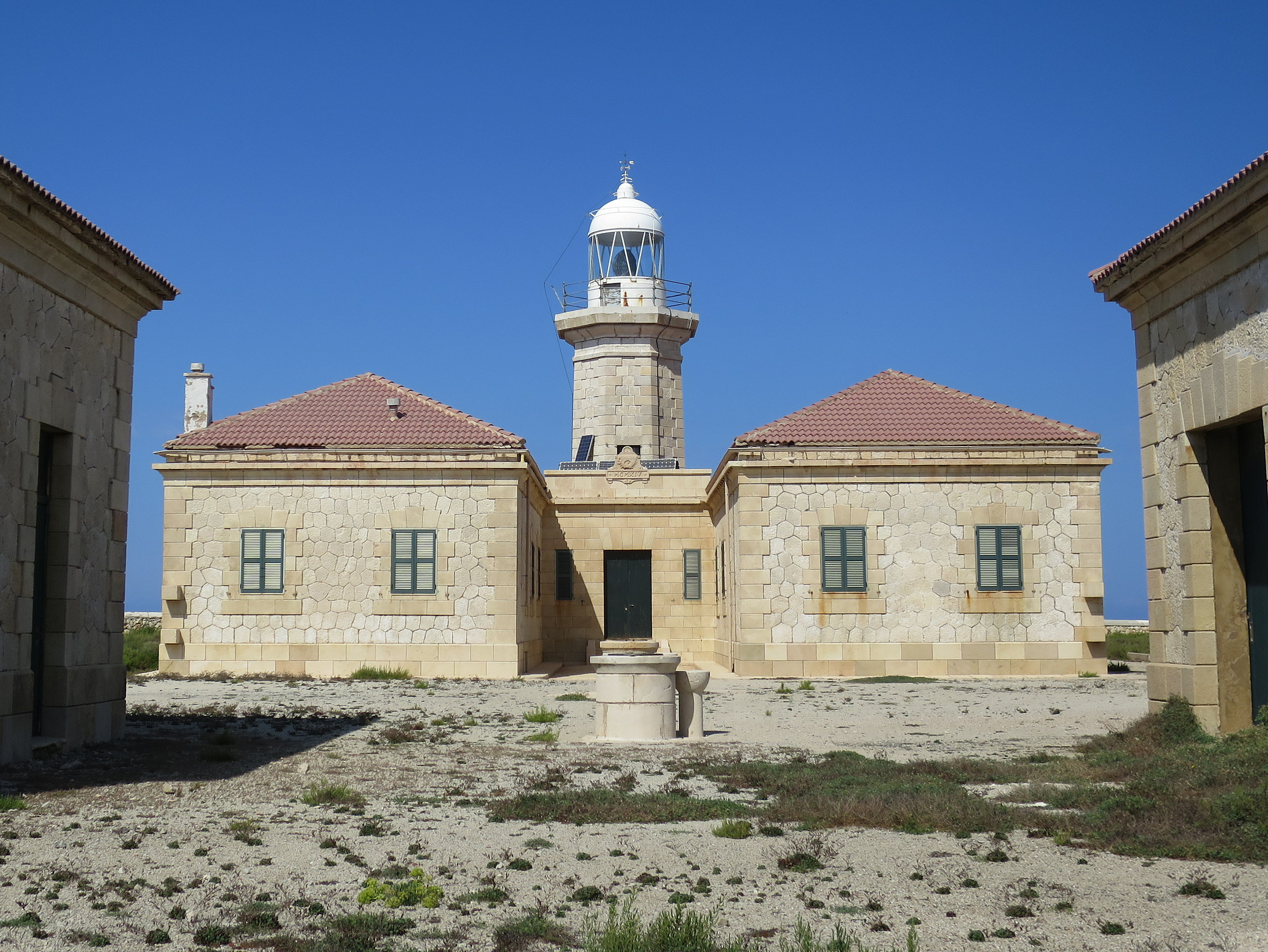
Rear elevation view

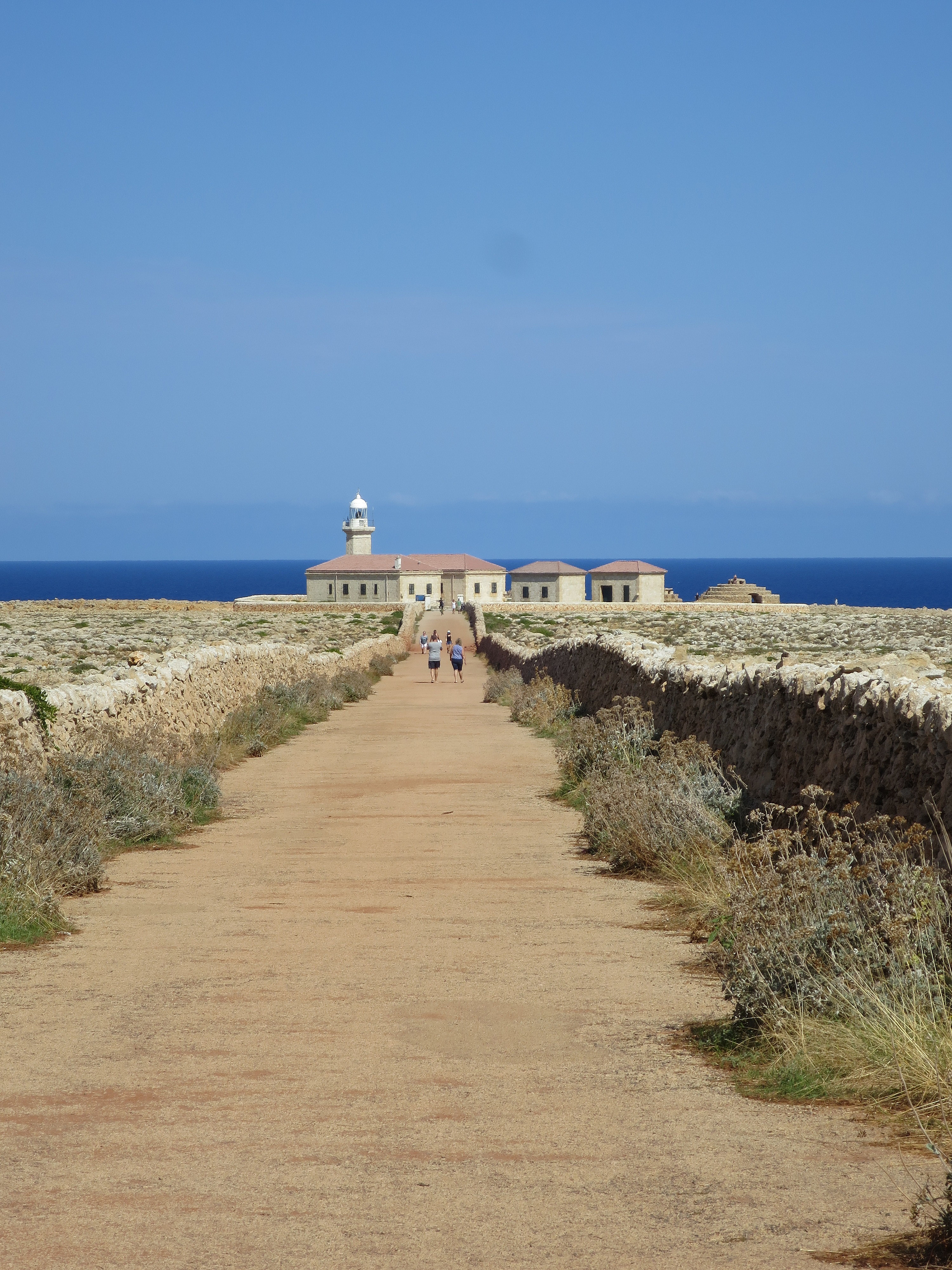
Narrow road to the lighthouse

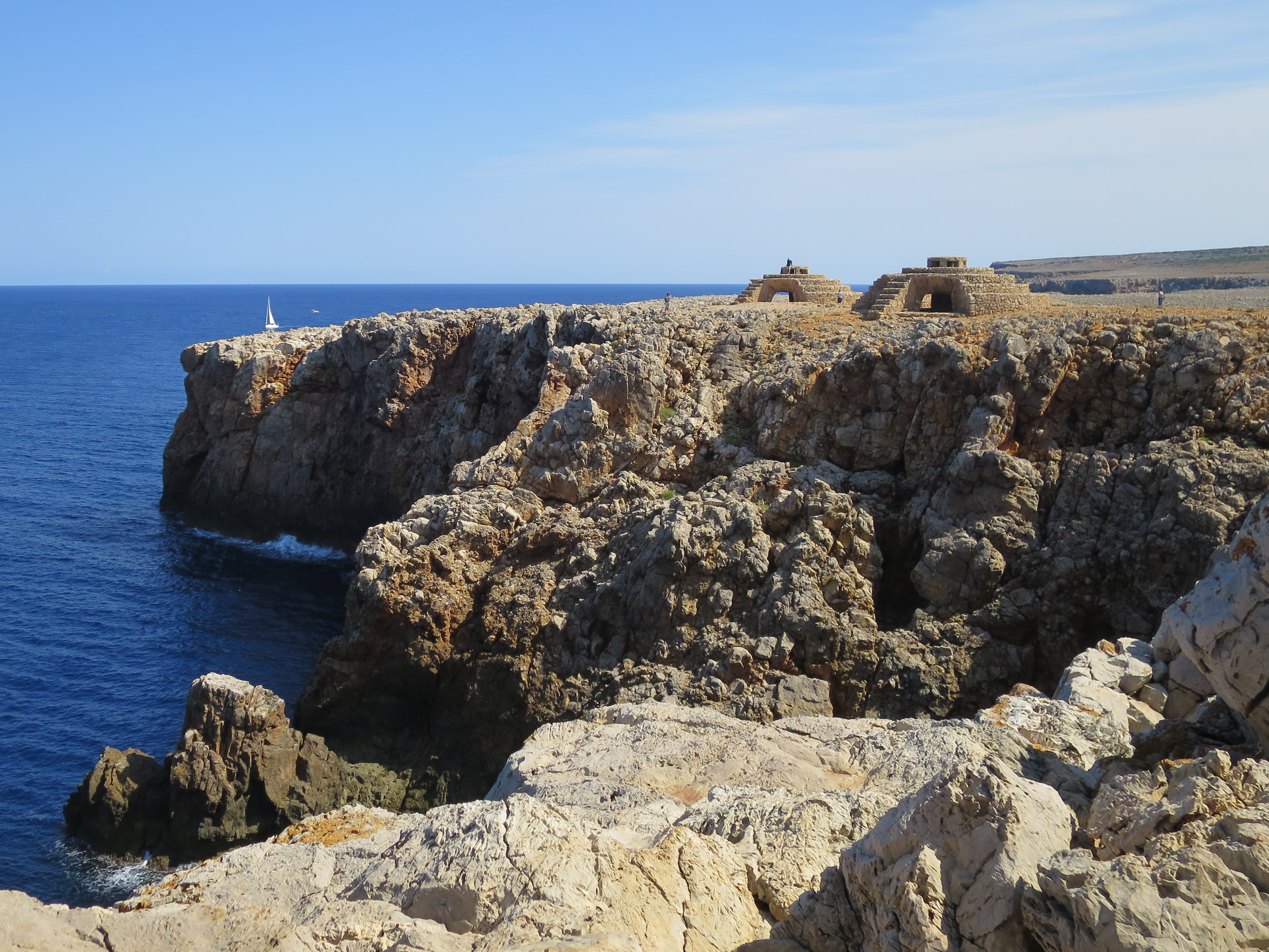
Cliffs at the lighthouse

== See also ==
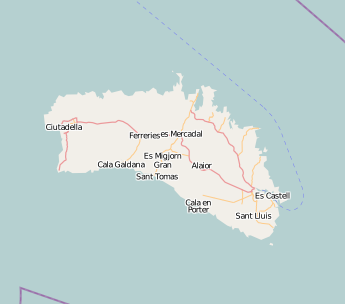
Map showing the lighthouses of Menorca
- List of lighthouses in Spain
- List of lighthouses in the Balearic Islands
