= Cala Mitjana =

Bay and beach on Menorca, Spain

Coordinates: 39.9344°N 3.97267°E

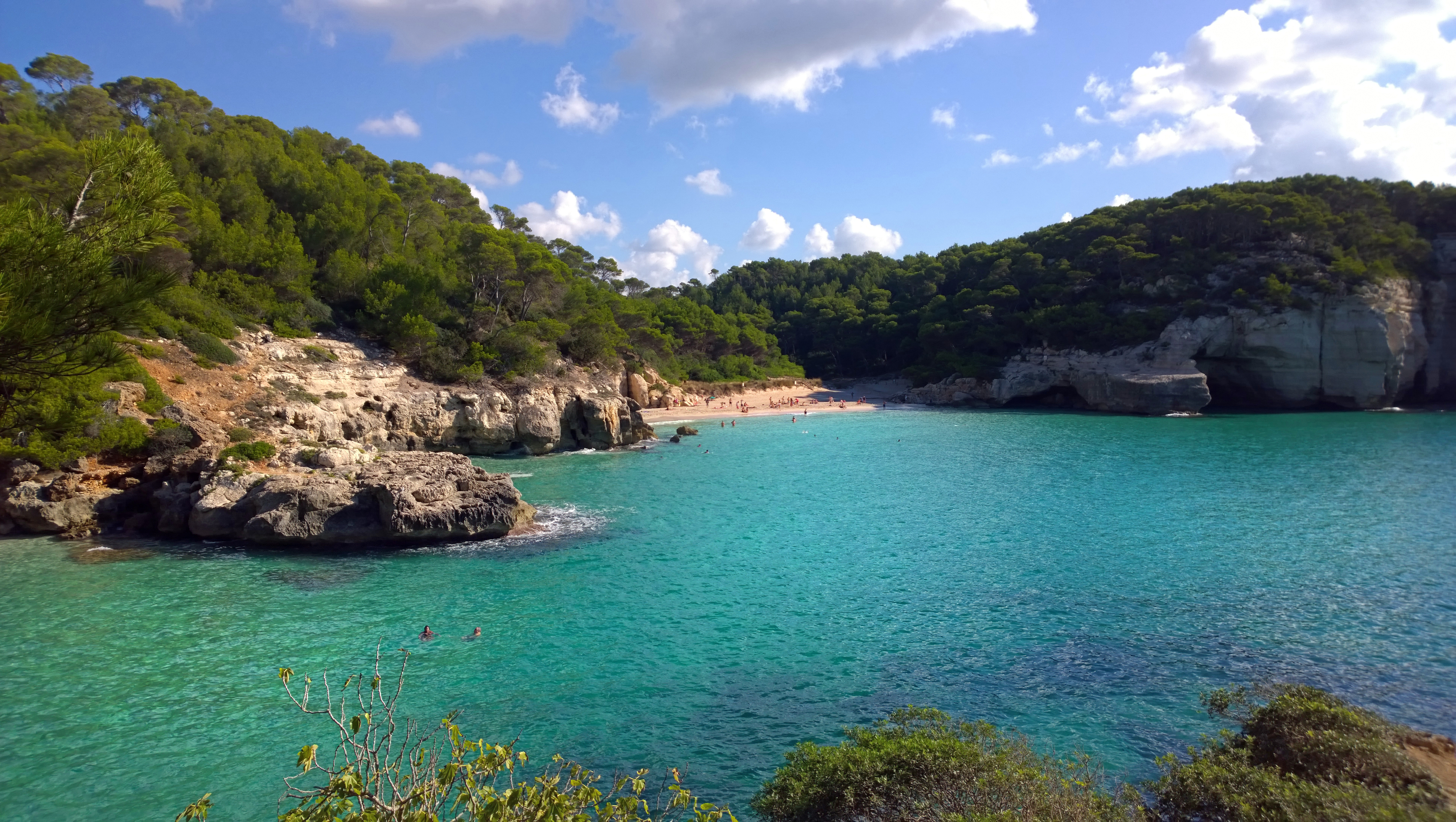
Beach of Cala Mitjana

Cala Mitjana is a bay and beach on the Spanish Mediterranean island of Menorca's southern coast. The small pine tree surrounded beach can be reached by foot in 20 minutes starting from a parking lot close to country road OM-714. The beach is highly frequented in the summer season.
