= Favàritx Lighthouse =

Lighthouse on Menorca, Spain

Favàritx Lighthouse Cape Favàritx
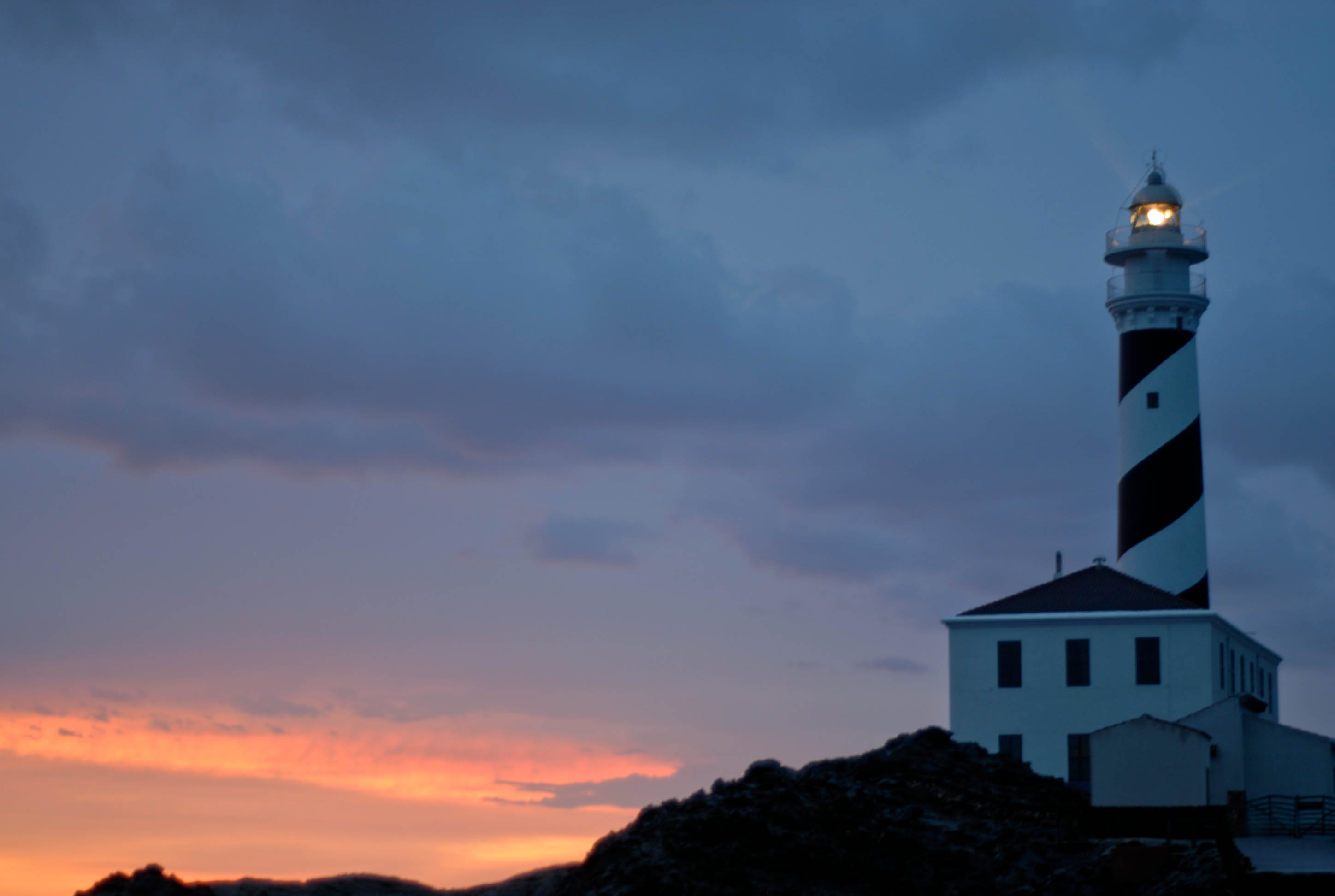
- Location: Cap de Favàritx, Menorca
- Coordinates: 39.997190°N 4.266968°E

Tower
- Constructed: 1916
- Construction: concrete
- Height: 28 metres (92 ft)
- Shape: cylindrical tower
- Markings: black and white spiral bands
- Operator: Comisión de faros

Light
- Focal height: 47 metres (154 ft)
- Range: 21 nautical miles (39 km; 24 mi)
- Characteristic: Fl (3) W 15s.
- Spain no.: ES-35900

The Favàritx Lighthouse is an active lighthouse on the Spanish island of Menorca.

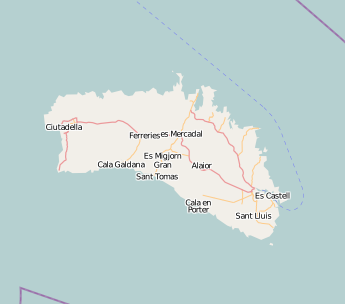
Map showing the lighthouses of Menorca

== See also ==
- List of lighthouses in Spain
- List of lighthouses in the Balearic Islands
