= La Cachucha beach =

Beach in Spain

Coordinates: 36°31′32″N 6°11′09″W

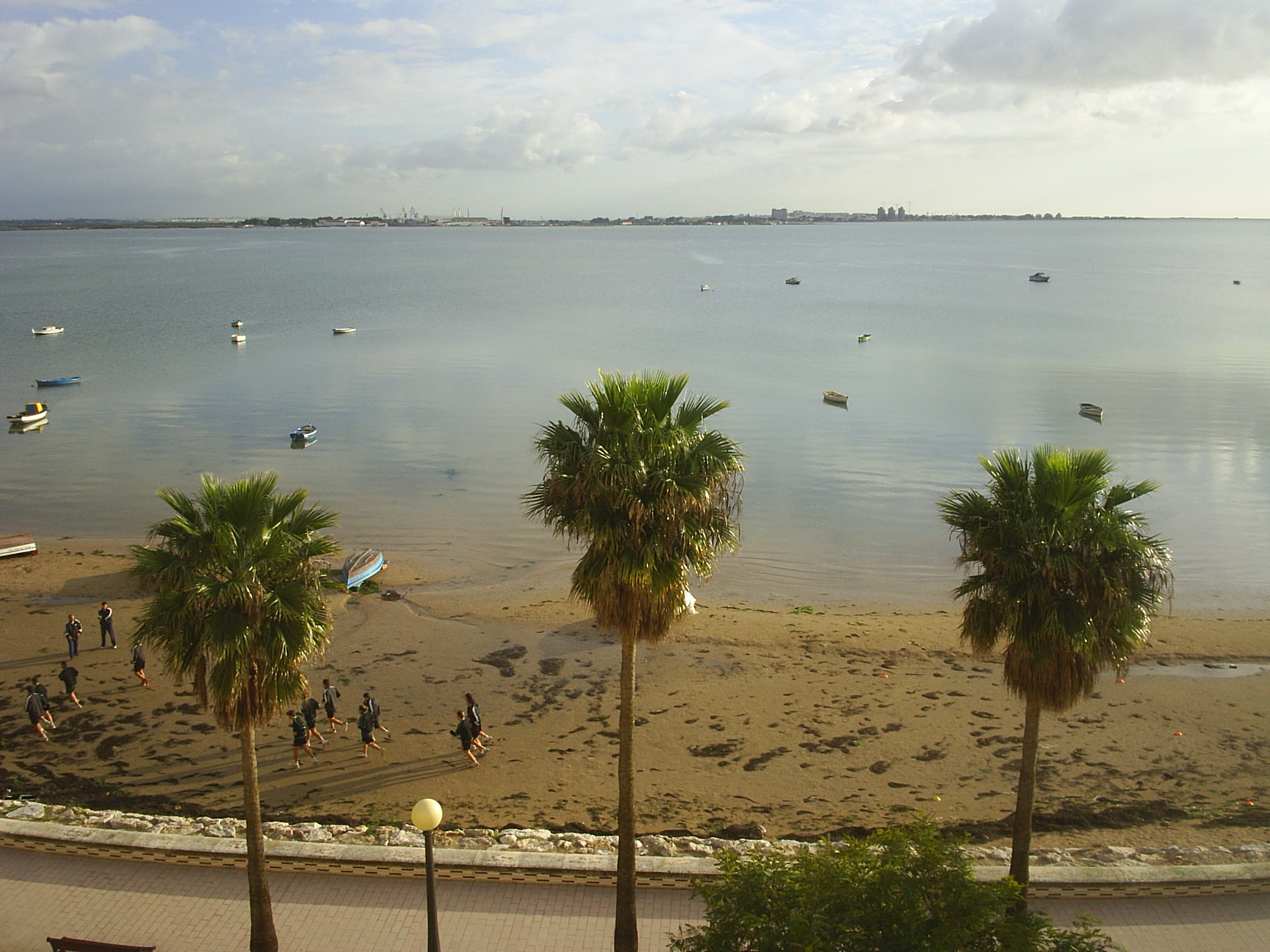
A view of the beach, seaside boardwalk in Puerto Real and the bay of Cadiz.

La Cachucha beach (from Spanish Playa de la Cachucha) is a beach located in Puerto Real, Spain. It's 500 meters long with golden and fin-grain sand. Nowadays the beach needs periodics sand nourishments because natural conditions were modified. The beach is protected from the waves by two dikes. Every day when the tide is low, there is a large extension of mud where you can see many crabs and protected birds that feed on the seaside.
