= Illa de l'Aire =

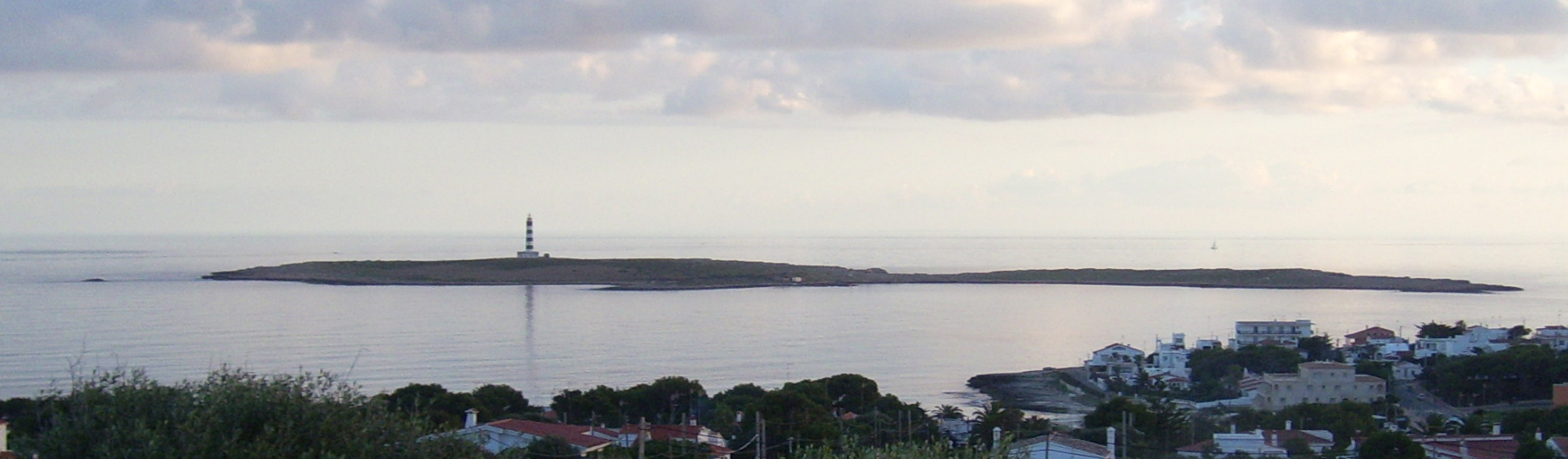
- Interactive map of Illa de l'Aire

Geography
- Coordinates: 39°48′03″N 04°17′24″E
- Archipelago: Baleric Islands
- Area: 0.34 km^{2} (0.13 sq mi)
- Length: 1.2 km (0.75 mi)
- Width: 0.3 km (0.19 mi)
- Highest elevation: 15 m (49 ft)

Administration
- Spain

Demographics
- Population: 0

Illa de l'Aire (also Isla del Aire in Spanish) in an islet on the southeast coast of Menorca, in the Balearic Islands, close to Punta Prima.

The island covers 34 hectares and has a circumference of 3.3 km. Its highest point was 15 m above sea level until the construction of the Illa de l'Aire lighthouse.

The island has an endemic lizard subspecies, Podarcis lilfordi lilfordi (Günther, 1874). On Menorca, it is better known as the sargantana negra (black lizard), though the lizards are able to change their skin colour to blend in with their surroundings. Lots of people land on the island but only in the accessible zone on the west coast (which is most of the island, including the lighthouse.) Indeed, the Illa de l'Aire is sometimes known as "Lizard Island", and forms a scenic backdrop for the resort of Punta Prima and the municipality of Sant Lluís. The black lizards are known to gather in numbers when a plum is placed on the ground.

The island has a population of 300 rabbits, an introduced animal, these were used as part of a self-spreading vaccine field trial in 2000 aimed at generating immunity to myxomatosis and rabbit hemorrhagic disease.
