= Arnía =

Beach in Spain

Arnía Playa de la Arnía
- Beach
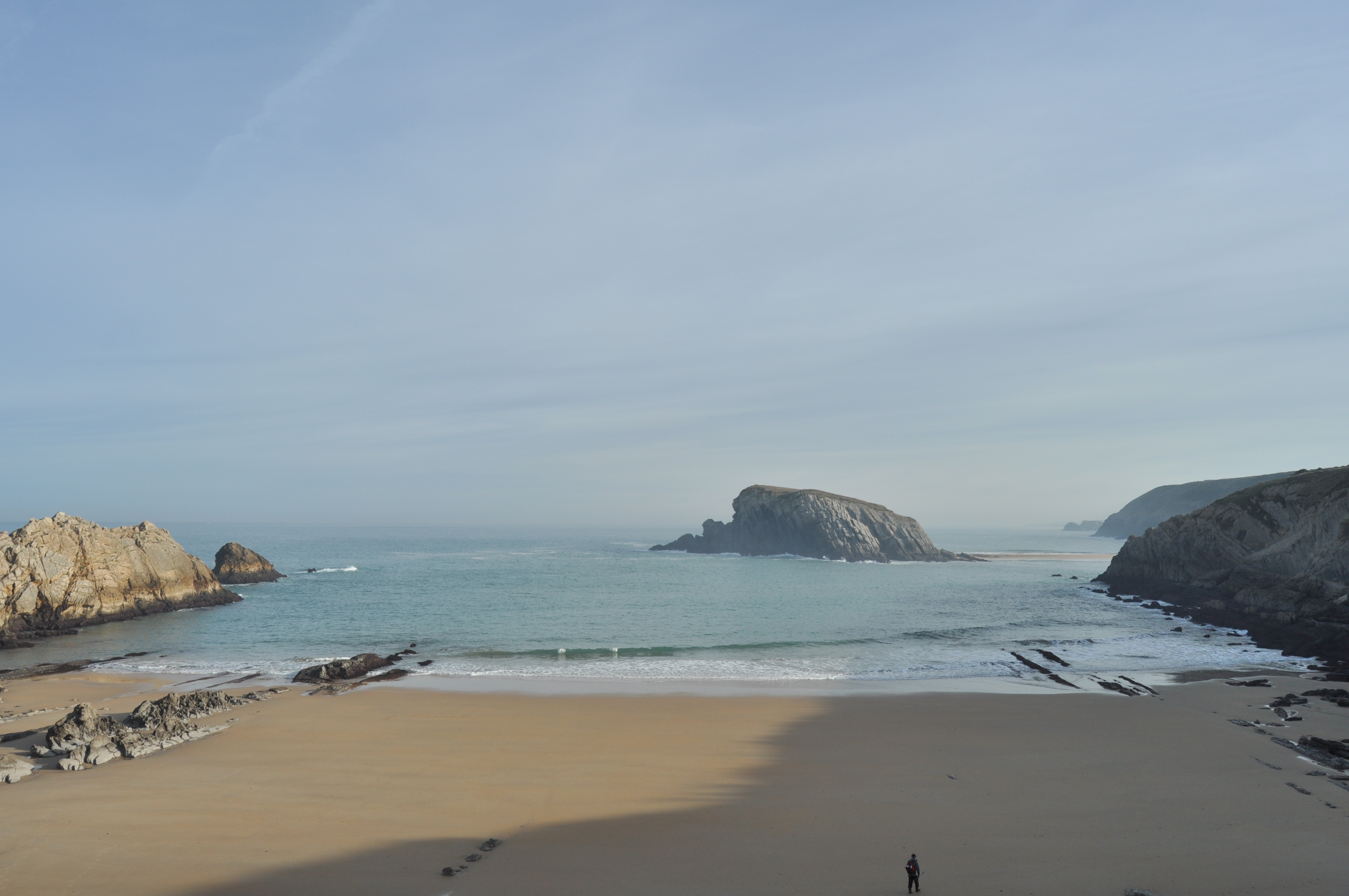

- Location of Arnía in Cantabria
- Coordinates: 43°28′26″N 3°54′57″W
- Location: Piélagos and Santa Cruz de Bezana, Cantabria, Spain

Playa de la Arnía, commonly known as Arnía, is a beach located in the natural park of the Dunas de Liencres and Costa Quebrada, between the municipalities of Piélagos and Santa Cruz de Bezana, in the autonomous community of Cantabria, Spain.

The beach is located in a rocky environment, with rocks that are more than 90 million years old.

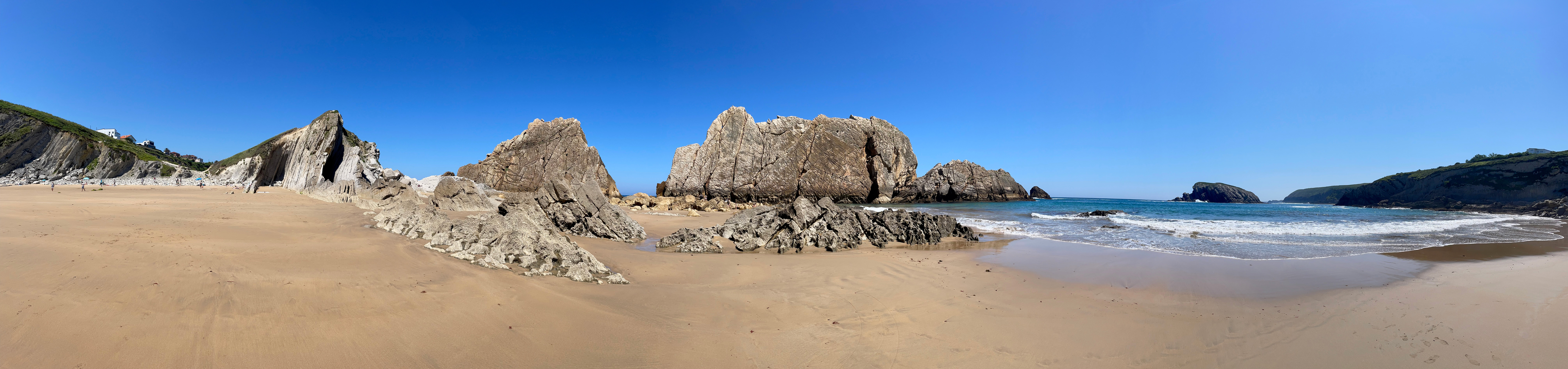
Panorama of Playa de la Arnía from the beach

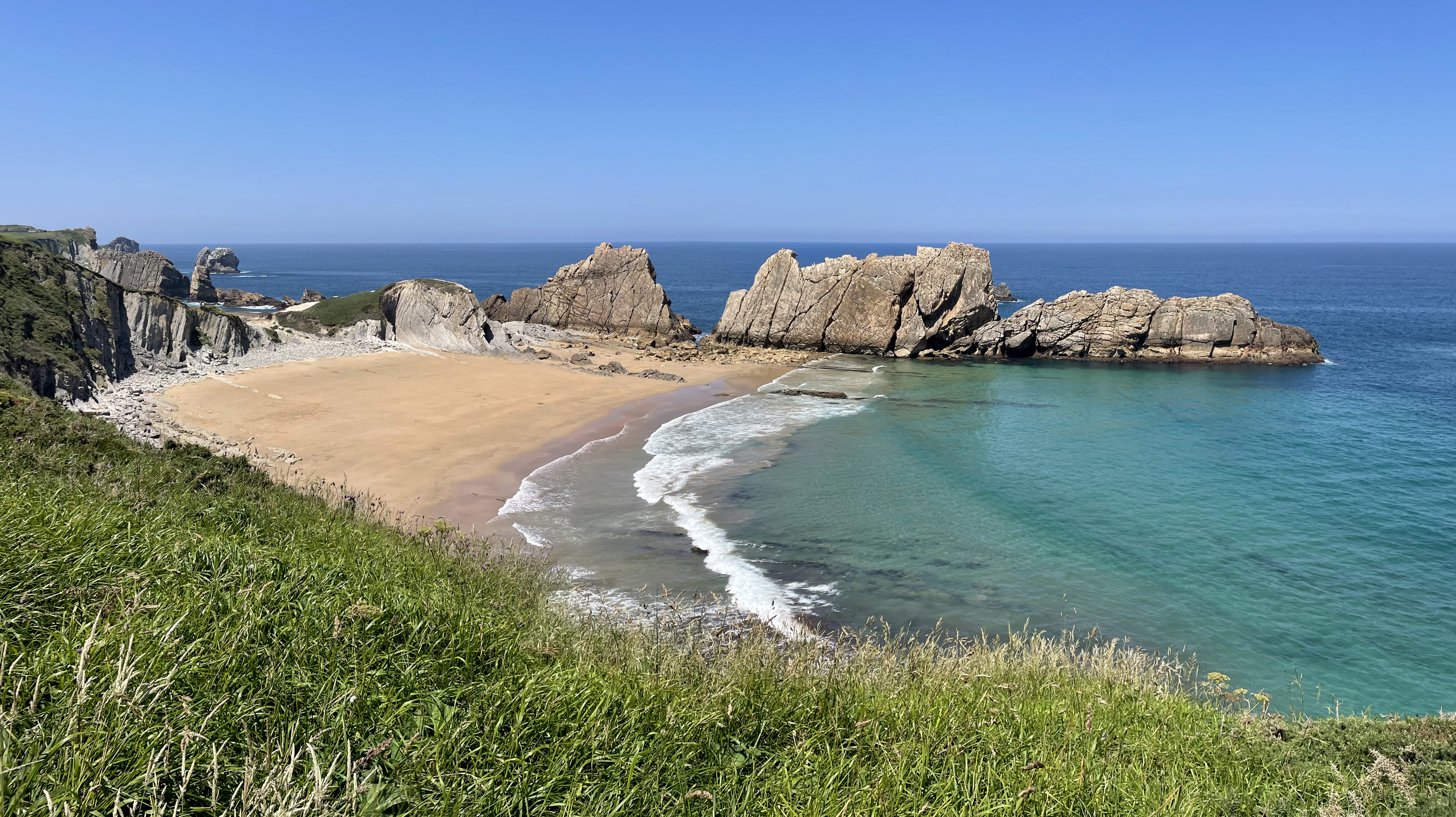
Panorama of Playa de la Arnía from a cliff nearby
