= Cala en Bosch =

- Resort town
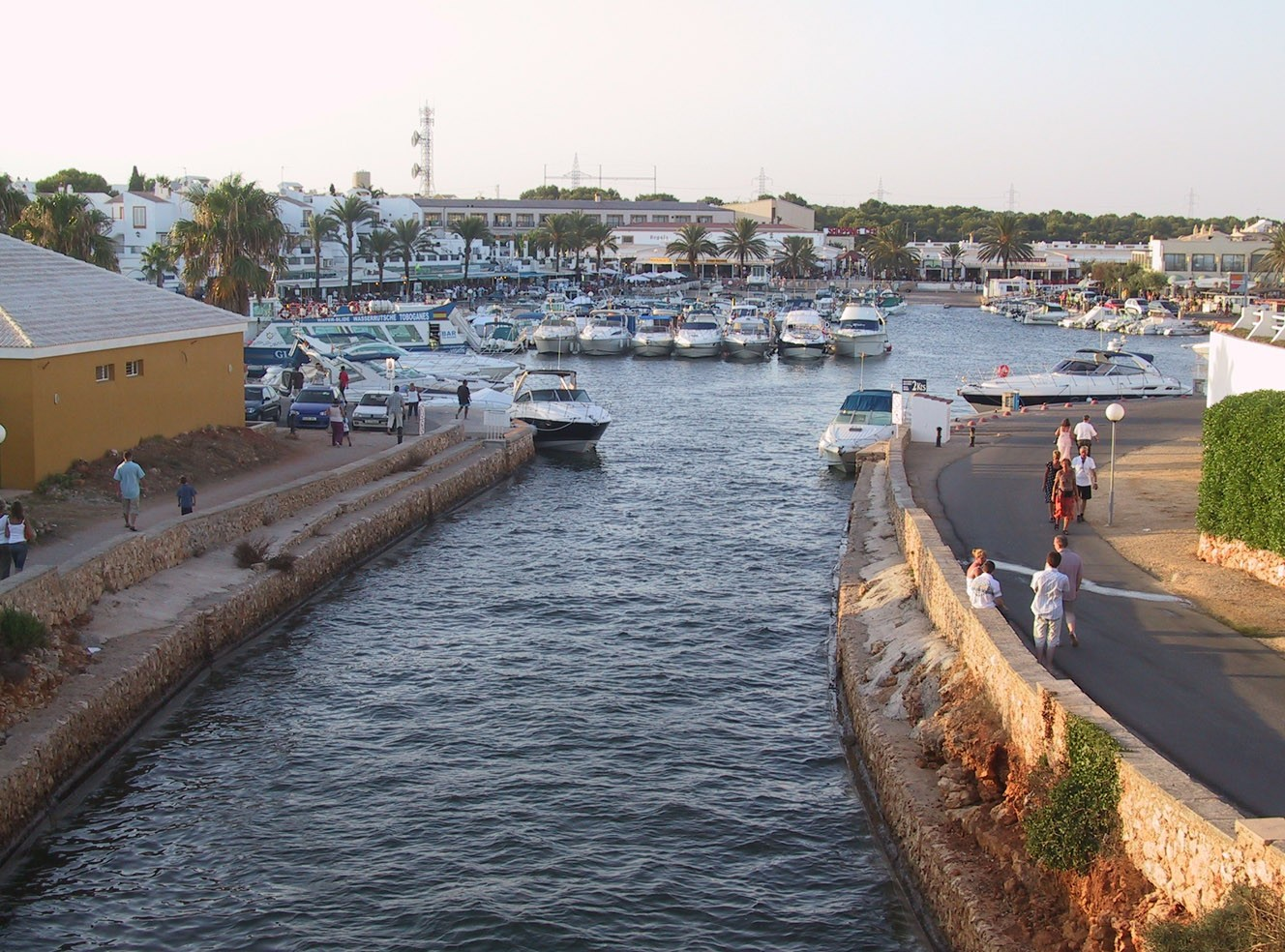
- Cala en Bosch

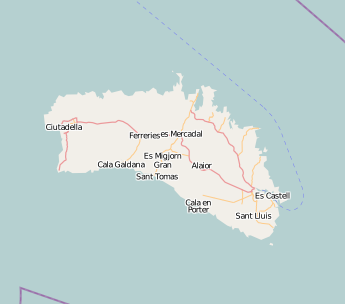
- Location of the town in Menorca
- Coordinates: 39°55′40″N 3°49′59″E
- Country: Spain
- Autonomous Community: Balearic Islands
- Province: Balearic Islands
- Island: Menorca
- Municipality: Ciutadella de Menorca
- Time zone: UTC+1 (CET)
  - Summer (DST): UTC+2 (CEST)

Cala en Bosch, also known as Cala'n Bosch or Cala en Bosc, is a beach, marina, hotel, and apartment resort located on the southwest coast of Menorca, one of the Balearic Islands in Spain. It is situated approximately 9 kilometres (5.6 mi) south of the town of Ciutadella de Menorca. The area is bordered by the neighborhoods of Son Xoriguer to the east and Cap d'Artrutx, which is the southwestern point of the island and home to the prominent Lighthouse of Artrutx. Cala en Bosch offers scuba diving facilities, making it an attractive destination for underwater enthusiasts.

Described as an area "edged by a shoreline of jagged rocks, several coves, and an inlet to a marina in an artificial lake," Cala en Bosch boasts natural surroundings. Visitors can enjoy the coastline, with its rocky formations and hidden coves.

Tourism in Cala en Bosch experienced significant growth in the 1980s, particularly driven by British visitors. The area witnessed a surge in the development of timeshare and self-catering apartments, catering to the preferences of vacationers seeking a home-away-from-home experience. Today, the town primarily consists of apartments and hotels, offering a range of accommodations to suit different budgets and preferences. The main center of activity and services can be found in the nearby town of Ciutadella de Menorca, located to the north of Cala en Bosch.

== Attractions ==
- Aquarock Waterpark (Menorca)
