= Arenal d'en Castell =

Town in Menorca, Spain

Coordinates: 40.0219°N 4.1835°E

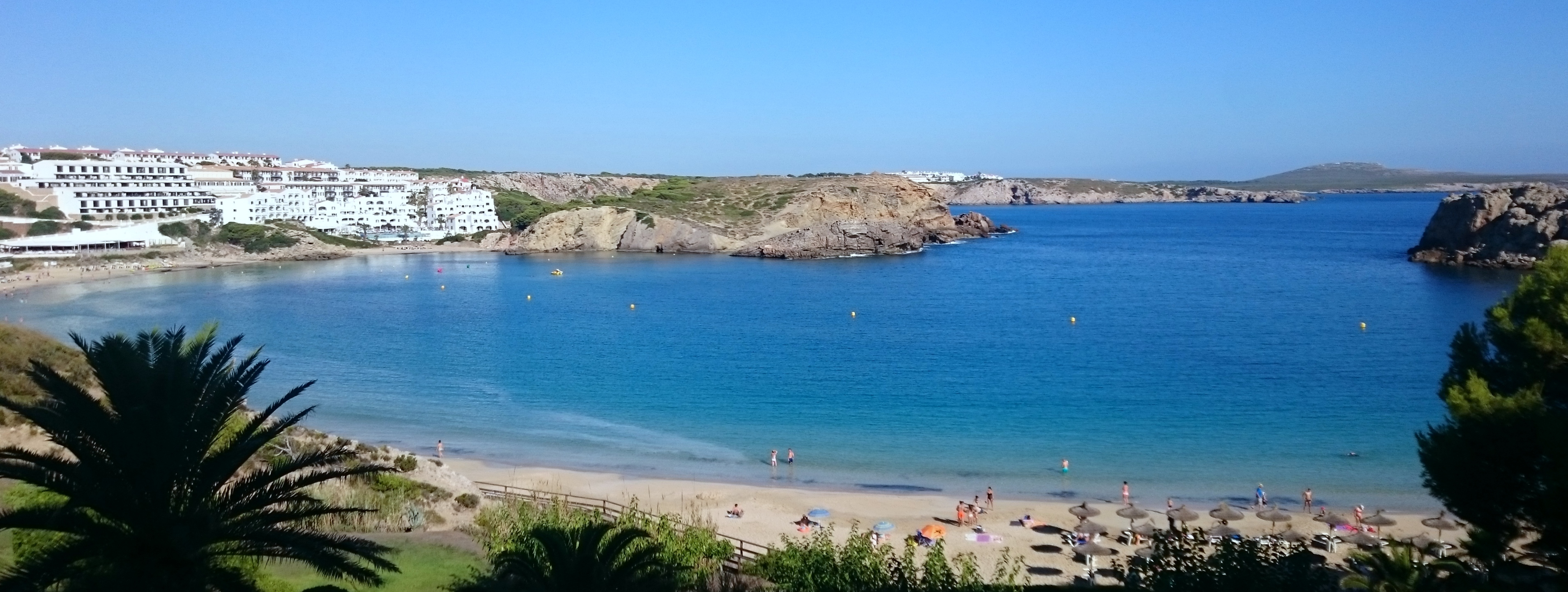
View of Arenal d'en Castell

Arenal d'en Castell is a small town in Es Mercadal, Menorca. It is also a start/arrival point for two stages of the GR 223 - Camí de Cavalls.

The town has a long sandy beach and is built around the sides of the bay overlooking the sea. It mainly consists of vacation villas and apartments with a few larger hotels.

The beach is well served with four restaurants - La Paella and El Copas being the two most established - with other amenities in the vicinity such as a small supermarket and a pharmacy. The beach is as popular with residents of the island as tourists, known mostly for its beautiful sand and clean turquoise water.
