= Cala Llucalari =

Bay and beach on Menorca, Spain

Coordinates: 39.891229°N 4.08193°E

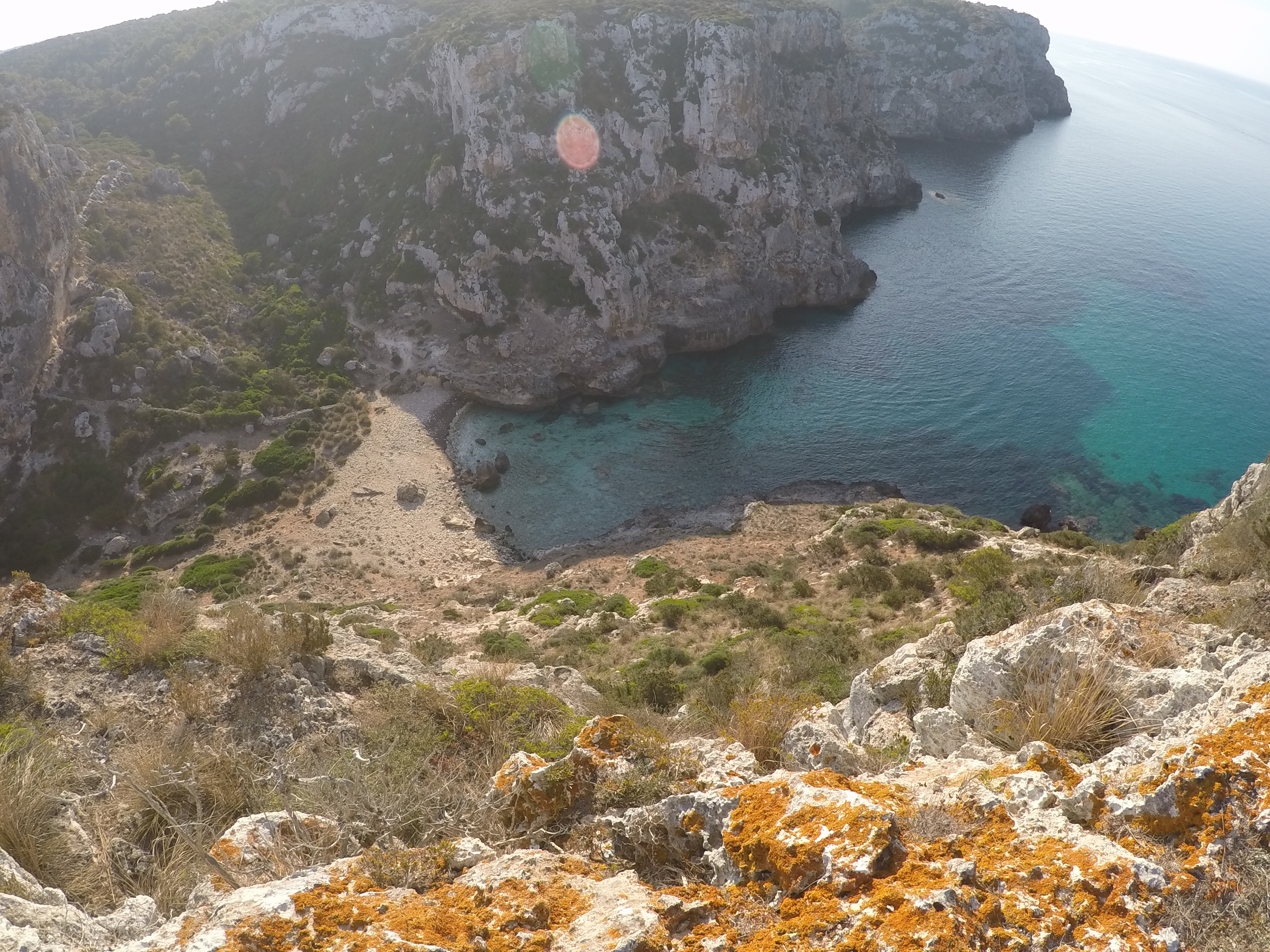
Cala Llucalari from the West

Cala Llucalari is a small bay and beach at Menorca's southern coast located in a natural preserve. The beach is sparsely visited, despite the highly developed Son Bou resort beach town nearby. The Camí de Cavalls passes just behind the bay.
