= Camí de Cavalls =

Ancient path encircling the island of Menorca, Spain

Coordinates: 39°55′35″N 3°54′33″E

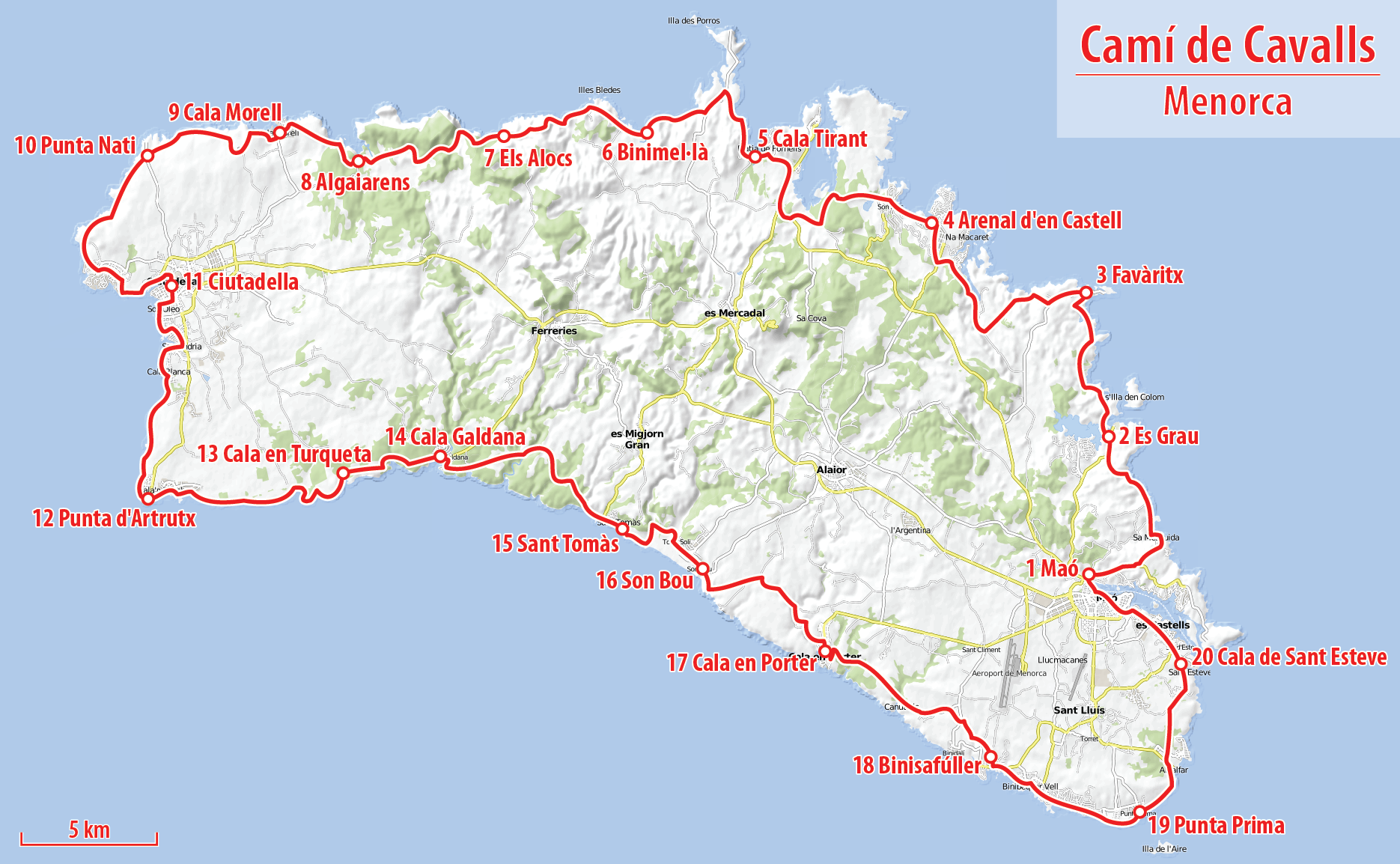
Route of the path 'Camí de Cavalls'

The Camí de Cavalls is an ancient path, 186 km (116 miles) in length, that encircles the island of Menorca, Spain. This long-distance walking route is the GR 223 of the Senderos de Gran Recorrido network in Spain that connects some of the most inaccessible beaches of Menorca.

== History ==
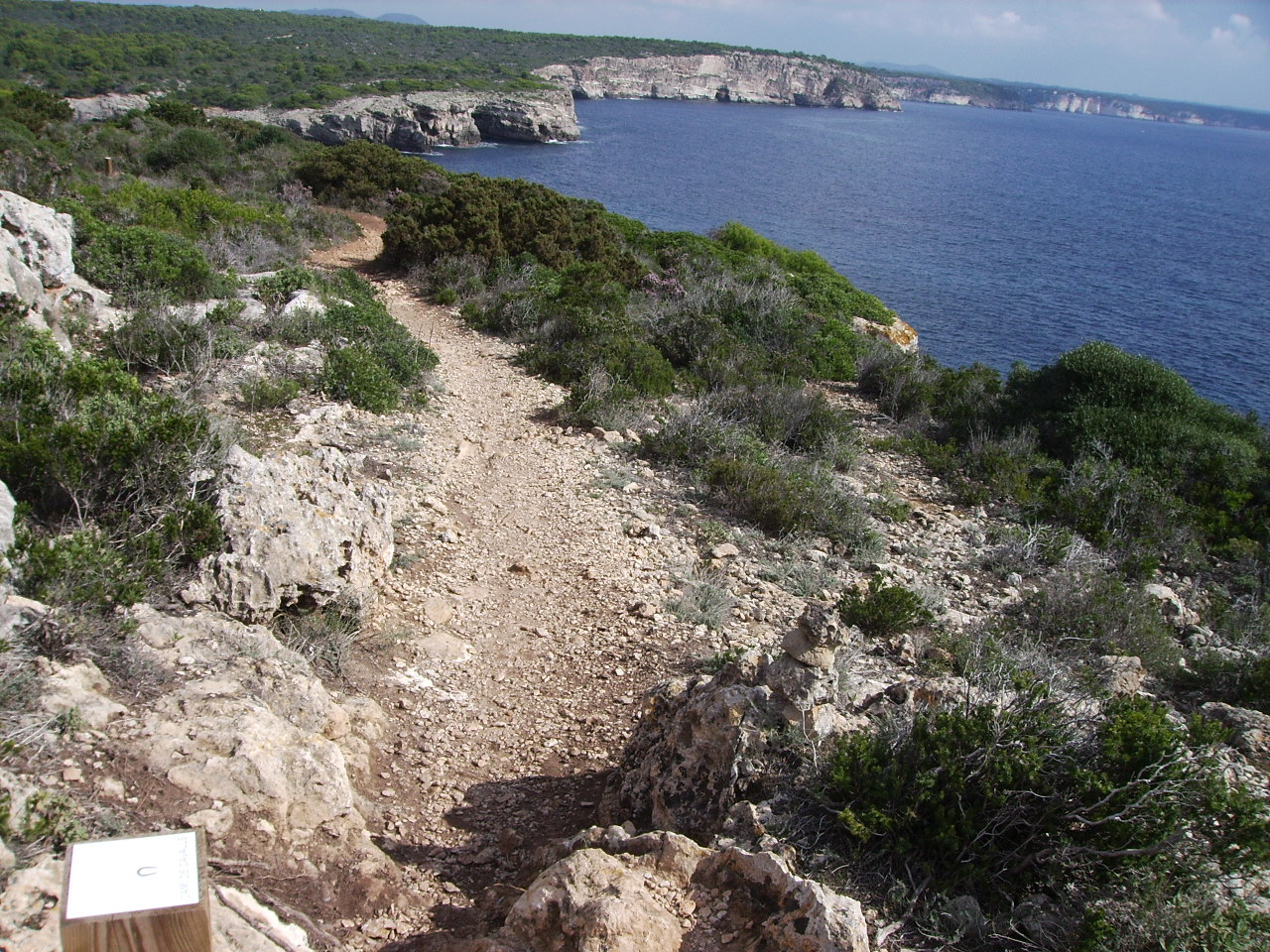
Camí de Cavalls: section from Es Talaier to Cala en Turqueta

It is widely accepted that the Camí de Cavalls was built in order to connect the watchtowers, fortresses and cannons distributed along the coast of the island and to make the transport of troops and artillery easier. However, the date of its origin is not so clear. The most accepted theory attributes it to the French invaders during the different periods they lived in the island, but according to some studies, it could have been created in the 14th century.

Since its original function was the defence and the control of the island, it was patrolled by soldiers mounted on Menorquin horses, hence the word cavalls (meaning "horses" in Catalan) in the name of the path.

== Restoration ==
During decades part of the path belonged to private properties and could not be used by everybody. However, after an agreement between the island's government and the landlords, the path became public. Then, the Government started the restoration of the whole path, spending €934,977.37 in a first stage and €800,159 in a second stage completed in May 2011.

== Stages ==
The path is divided in 20 different stages, each of them between 5 and 14 km. All the start and arrival points can be gained access to by road traffic, making possible to cover only one or some stages of the path at a time.

| Stage | Start | Finish | Duration | Distance | Difficulty |
|---|---|---|---|---|---|
| 1 | Mahón | Es Grau | 3 h 30 min | 10.0 km (6.2 miles) | Medium |
| 2 | Es Grau | Favàritx | 3 h 30 min | 8.6 km (5.3 miles) | Medium |
| 3 | Favàritx | Arenal d'en Castell | 5 h | 13.6 km (8.5 miles) | Medium |
| 4 | Arenal d'en Castell | Cala Tirant | 4 h | 10.8 km (6.7 miles) | Easy |
| 5 | Cala Tirant | Binimel·là | 4 h | 9.6 km (6.0 miles) | Medium |
| 6 | Binimel·là | Els Alocs | 5 h | 8.9 km (5.5 miles) | Difficult |
| 7 | Els Alocs | Algaiarens | 4 h 30 min | 9.7 km (6.0 miles) | Middle |
| 8 | Algaiarens | Cala Morell | 2 h 10 min | 5.4 km (3.4 miles) | Middle |
| 9 | Cala Morell | Punta Nati | 3 h | 7.0 km (4.3 miles) | Easy |
| 10 | Punta Nati | Ciutadella | 4 h | 10.5 km (6.5 miles) | Easy |
| 11 | Ciutadella | Cap d’Artrutx | 5 h | 13.2 km (8.2 miles) | Easy |
| 12 | Cap d'Artrutx | Cala en Turqueta | 5 h | 13.3 km (8.3 miles) | Medium |
| 13 | Cala en Turqueta | Cala Galdana | 2 h 30 min | 6.4 km (4.0 miles) | Easy |
| 14 | Cala Galdana | Sant Tomàs | 4 h 30 min | 10.8 km (6.7 miles) | Medium |
| 15 | Sant Tomàs | Son Bou | 2 h 30 min | 6.4 km (4.0 miles) | Easy |
| 16 | Son Bou | Cala en Porter | 3 h 30 min | 8.0 km (5.0 miles) | Medium |
| 17 | Cala en Porter | Binisafúller | 4 h 30 min | 11.8 km (7.3 miles) | Easy |
| 18 | Binisafúller | Punta Prima | 3 h 30 min | 8.1 km (5.0 miles) | Easy |
| 19 | Punta Prima | Cala de Sant Esteve | 2 h 40 min | 7.3 km (4.5 miles) | Easy |
| 20 | Cala de Sant Esteve | Mahón | 2 h 20 min | 6.0 km (3.7 miles) | Easy |

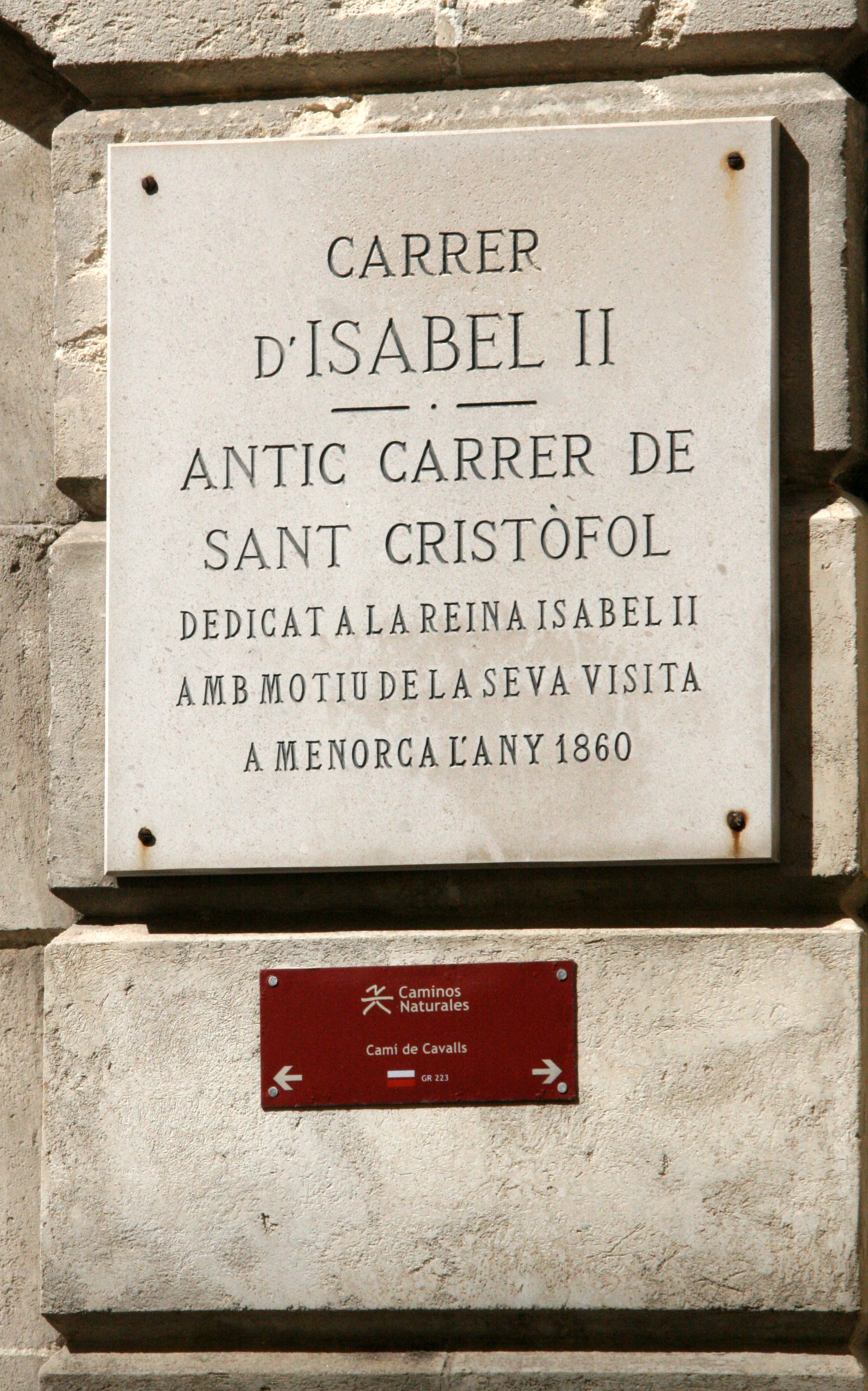
Camí de Cavalls sign. Stage 1, Carrer d'Isabel II, Mahón.

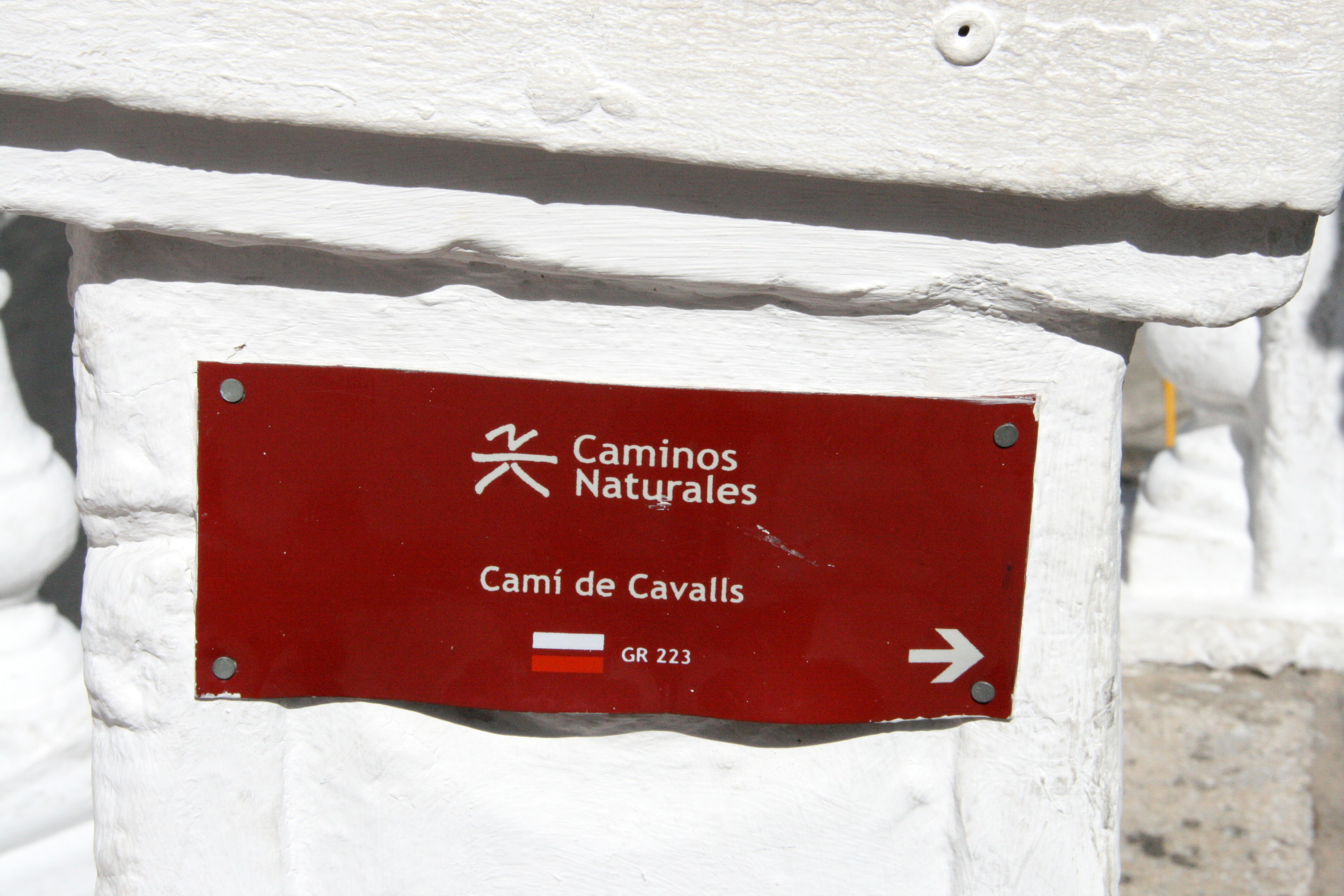
Camí de Cavalls sign. Stage 1, Costa de ses Voltes, Mahón.

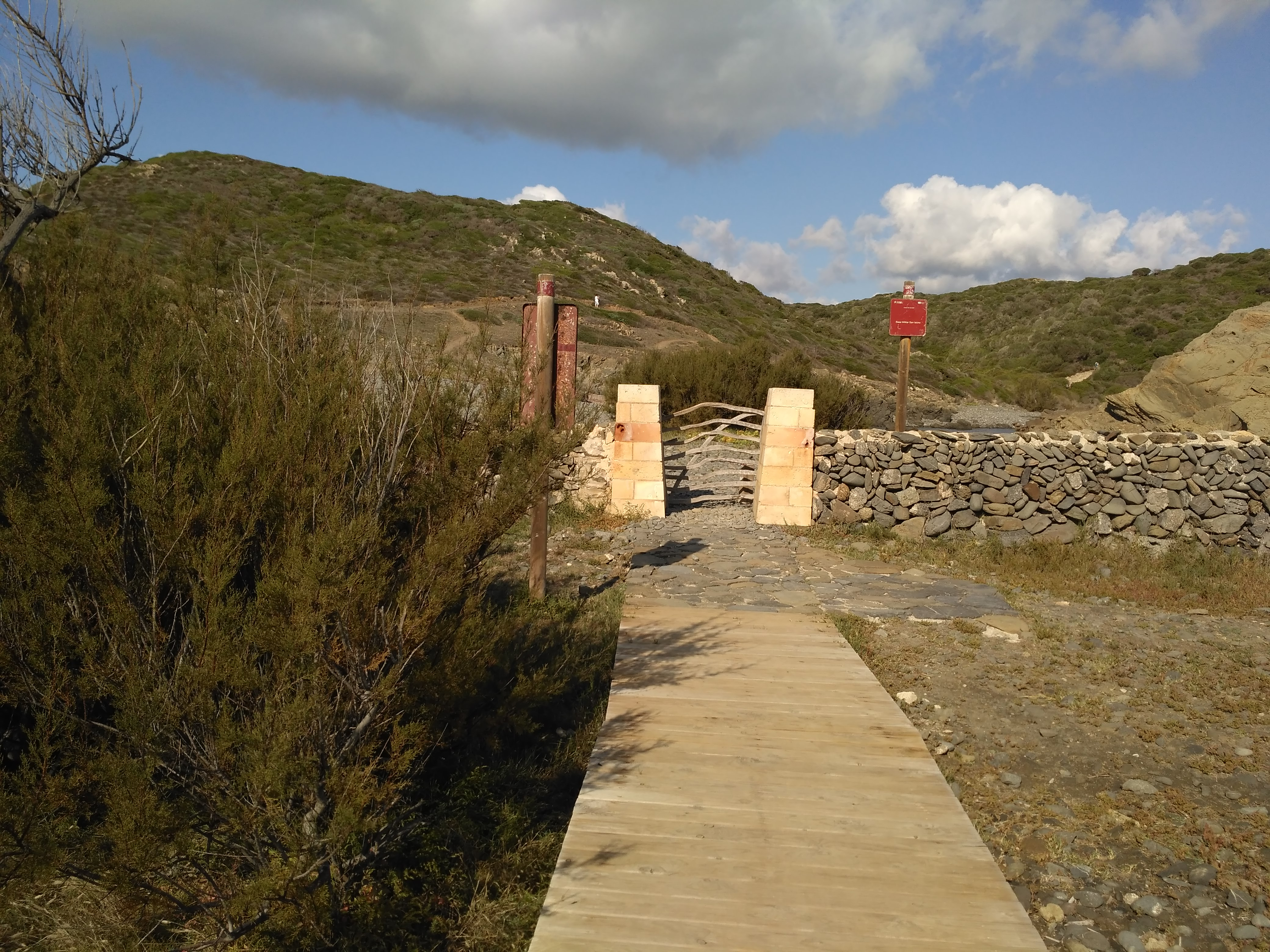
Camí de Cavalls. Stage 1, near Cala Mesquida.

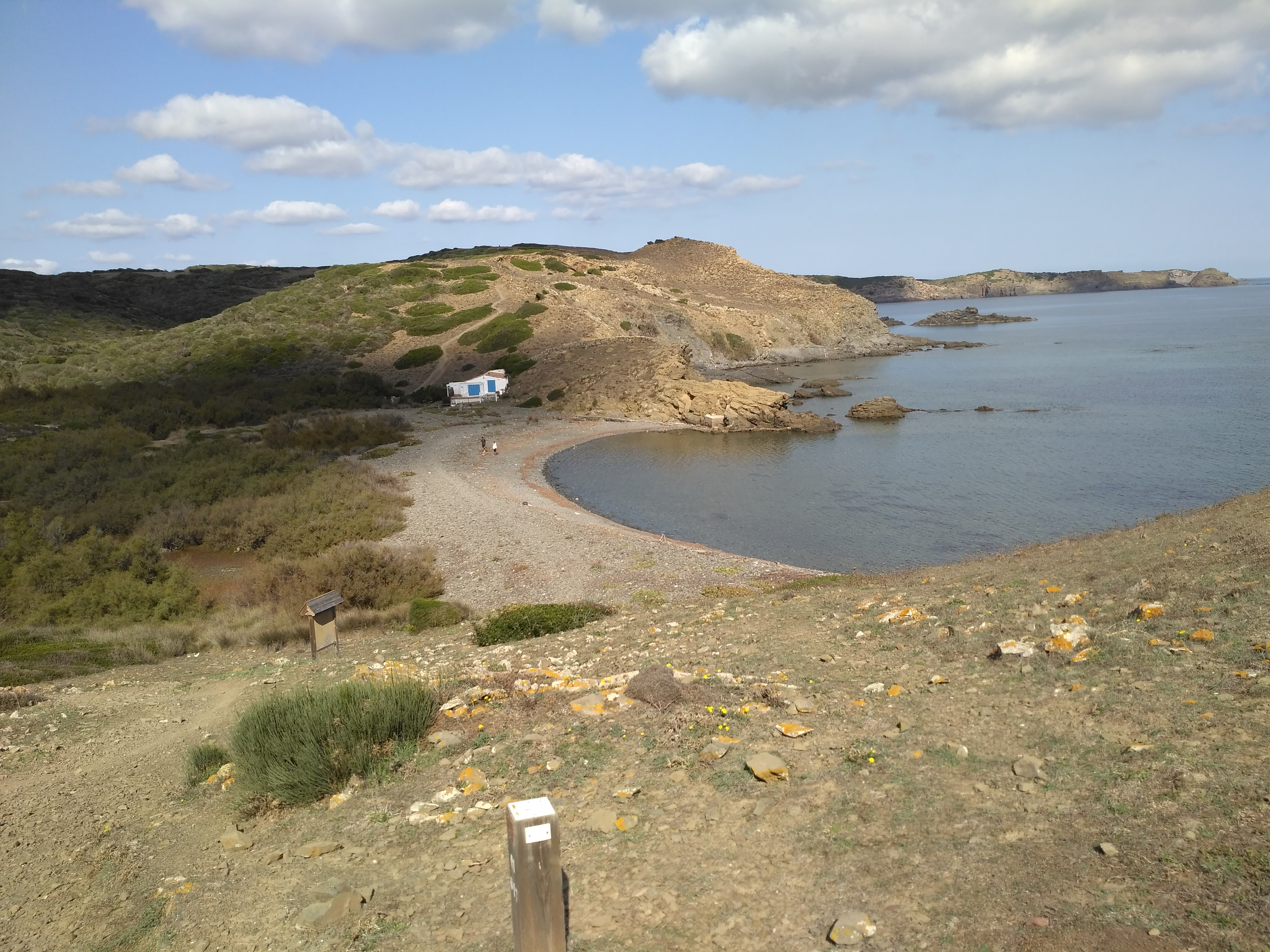
Camí de Cavalls. Stage 1, Macar de Binillautí.

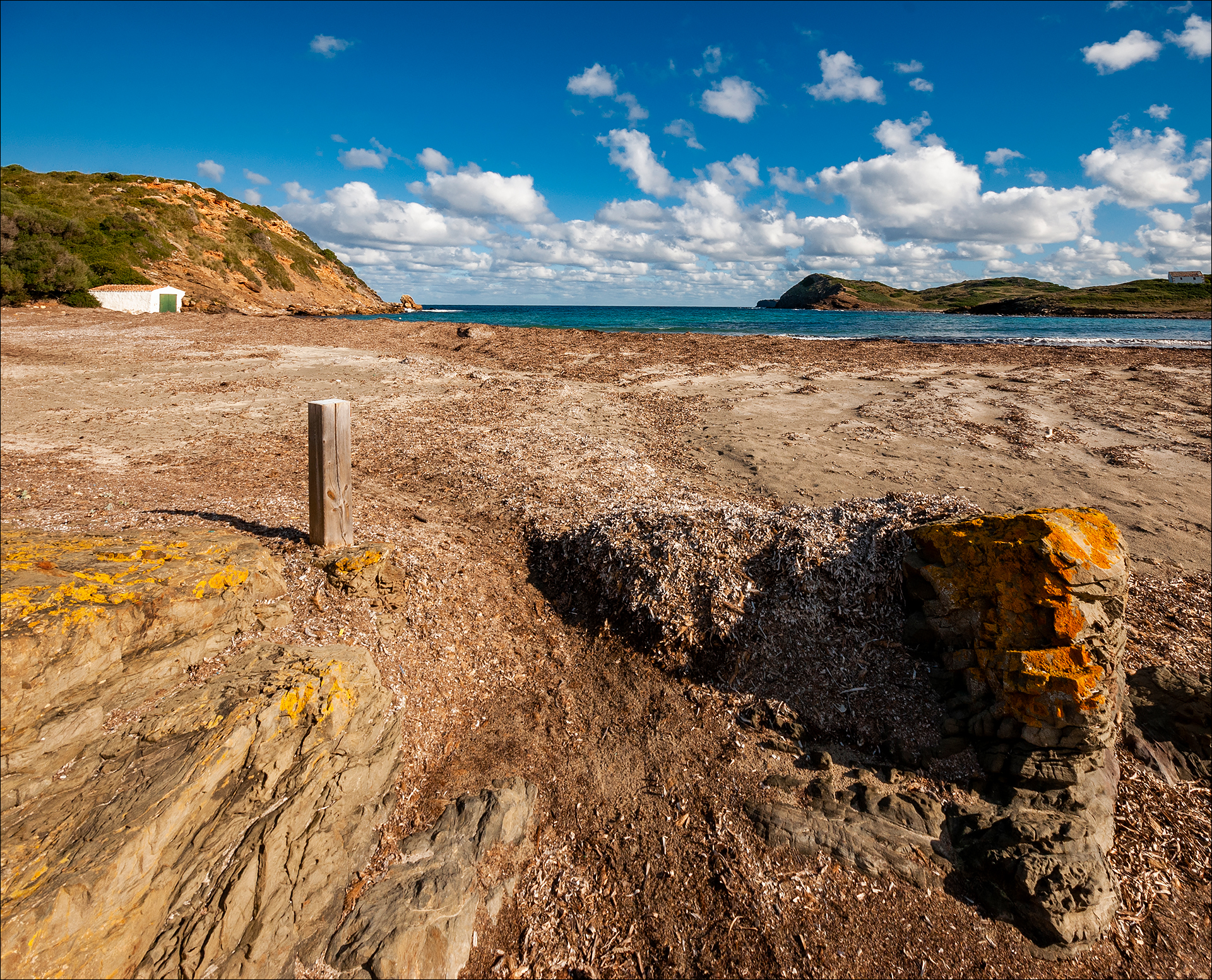
Camí de Cavalls. Stage 2, Cala de Sa Torreta.

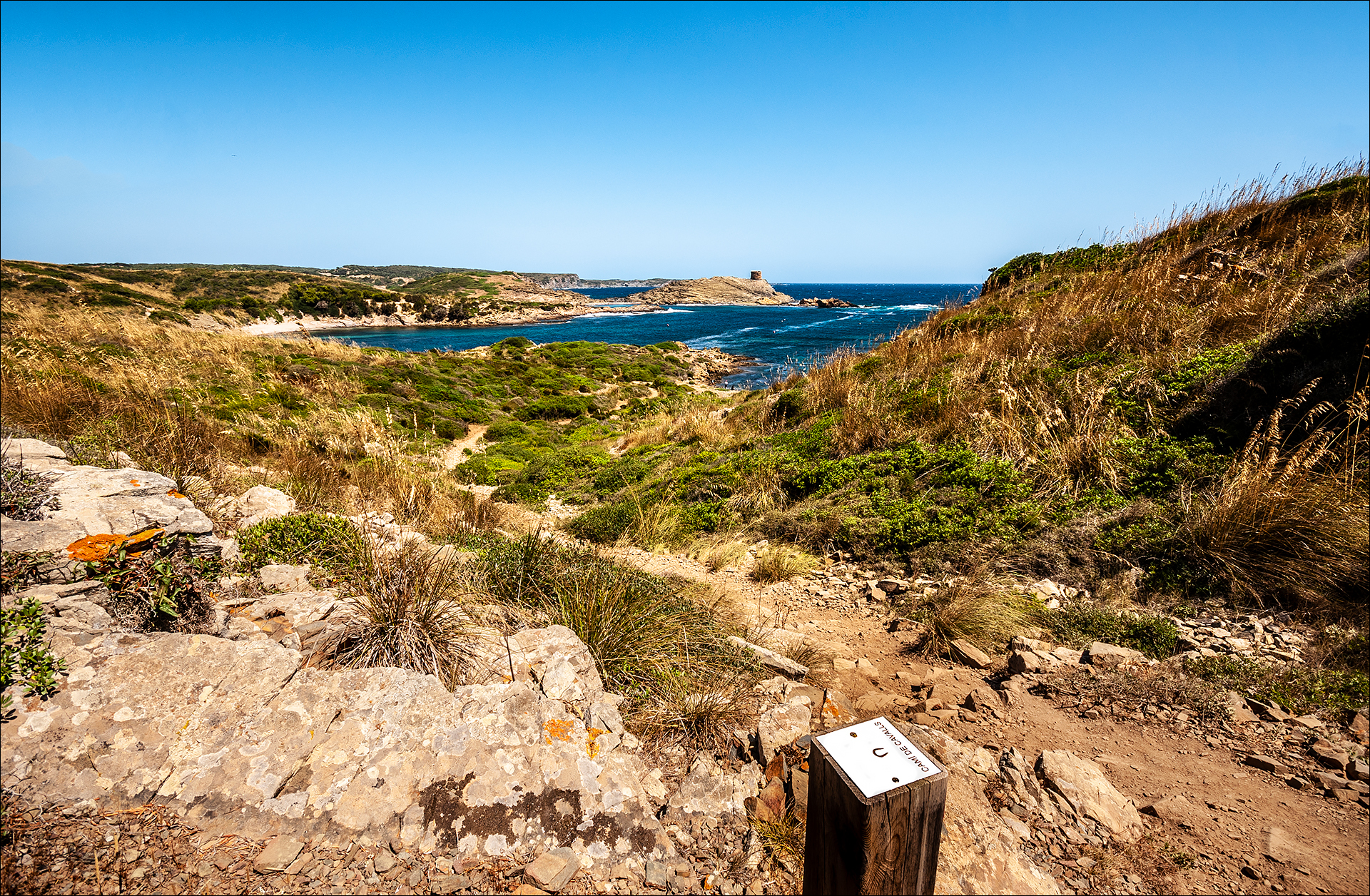
Camí de Cavalls sign. Stage 2, on the way to Cala des Tamarells del Sud.

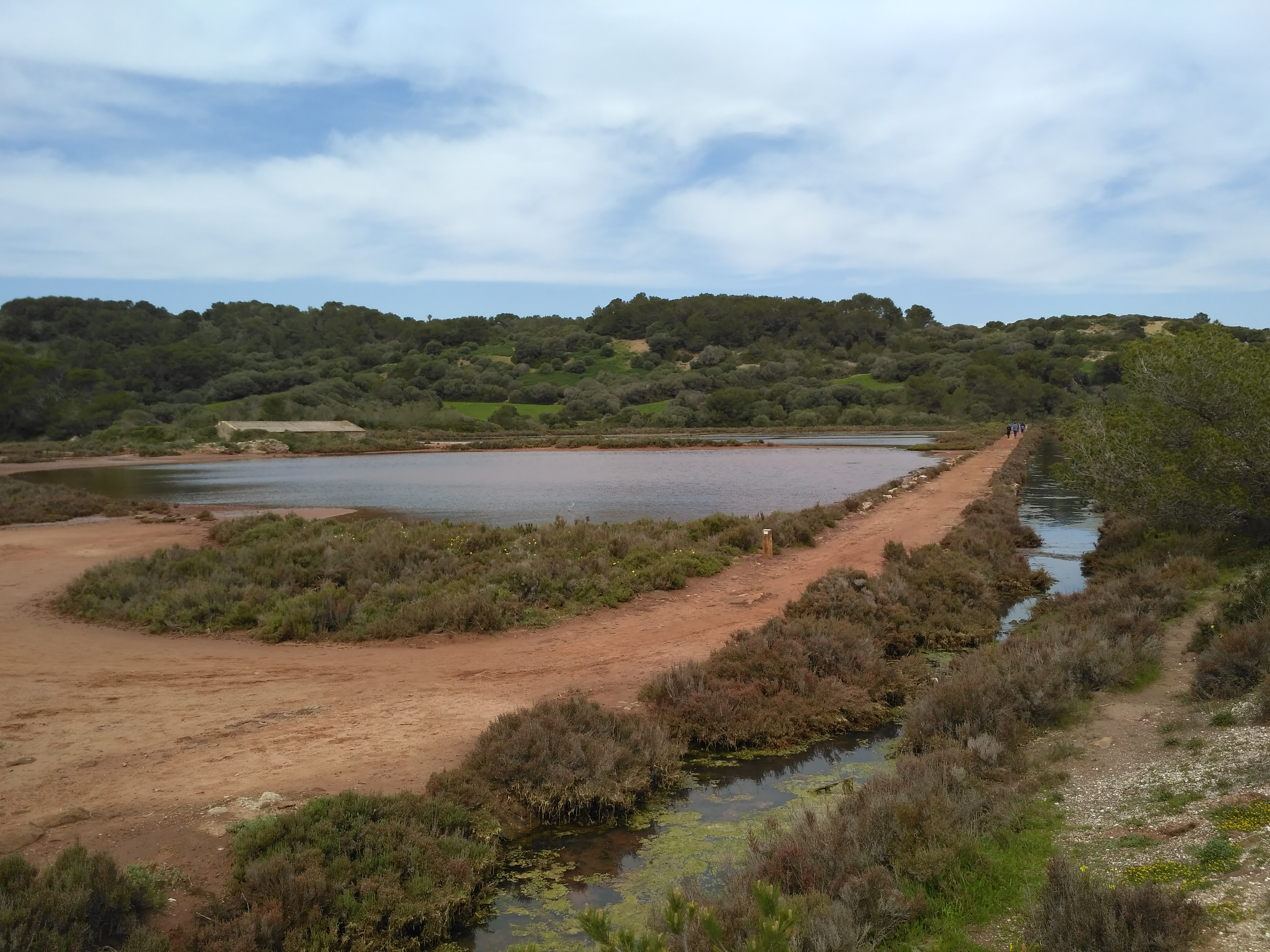
Camí de Cavalls. Stage 3. Ses Salines de Mongofre

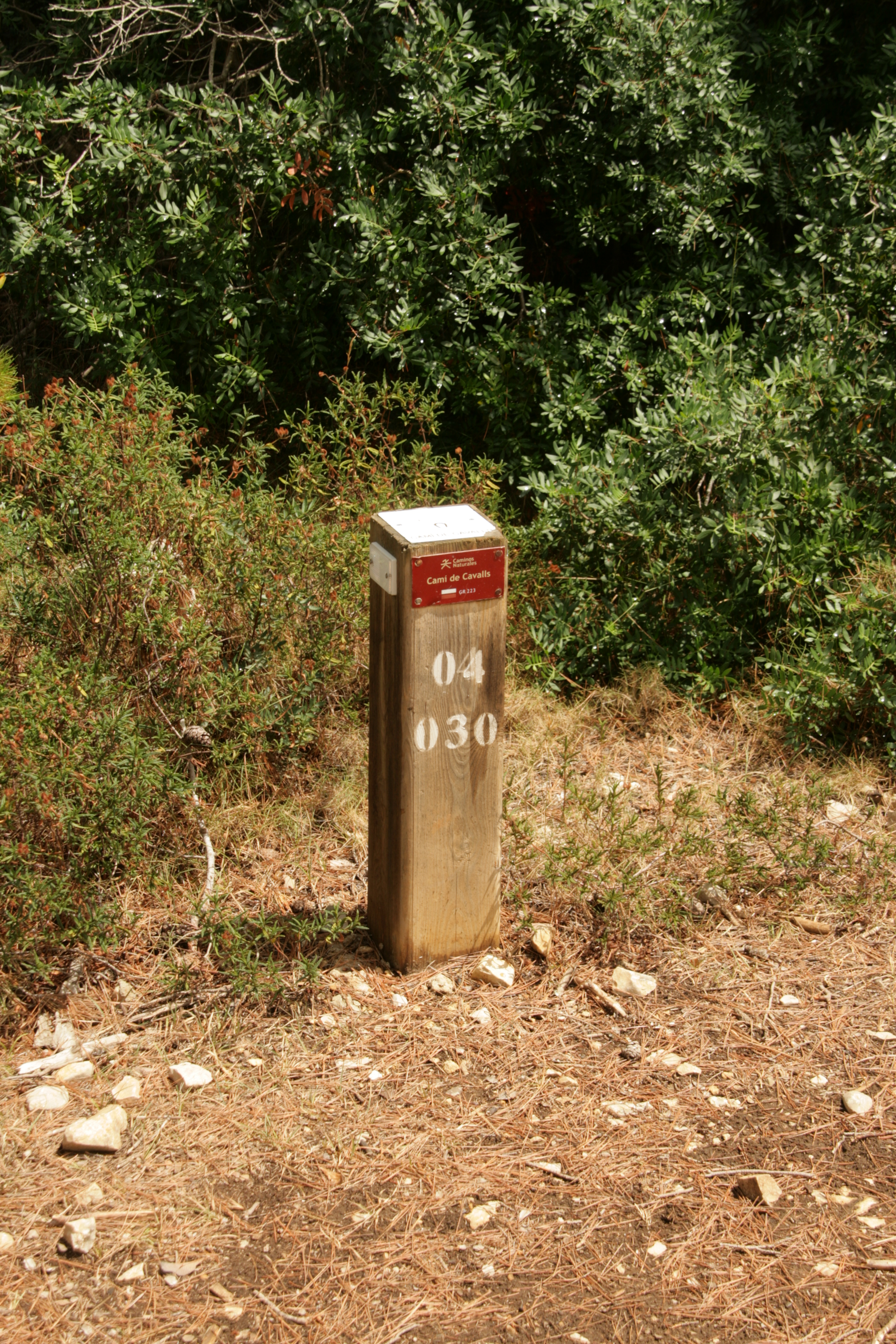
Camí de Cavalls sign. Stage 4, Boscos de s'Albufera des Compte

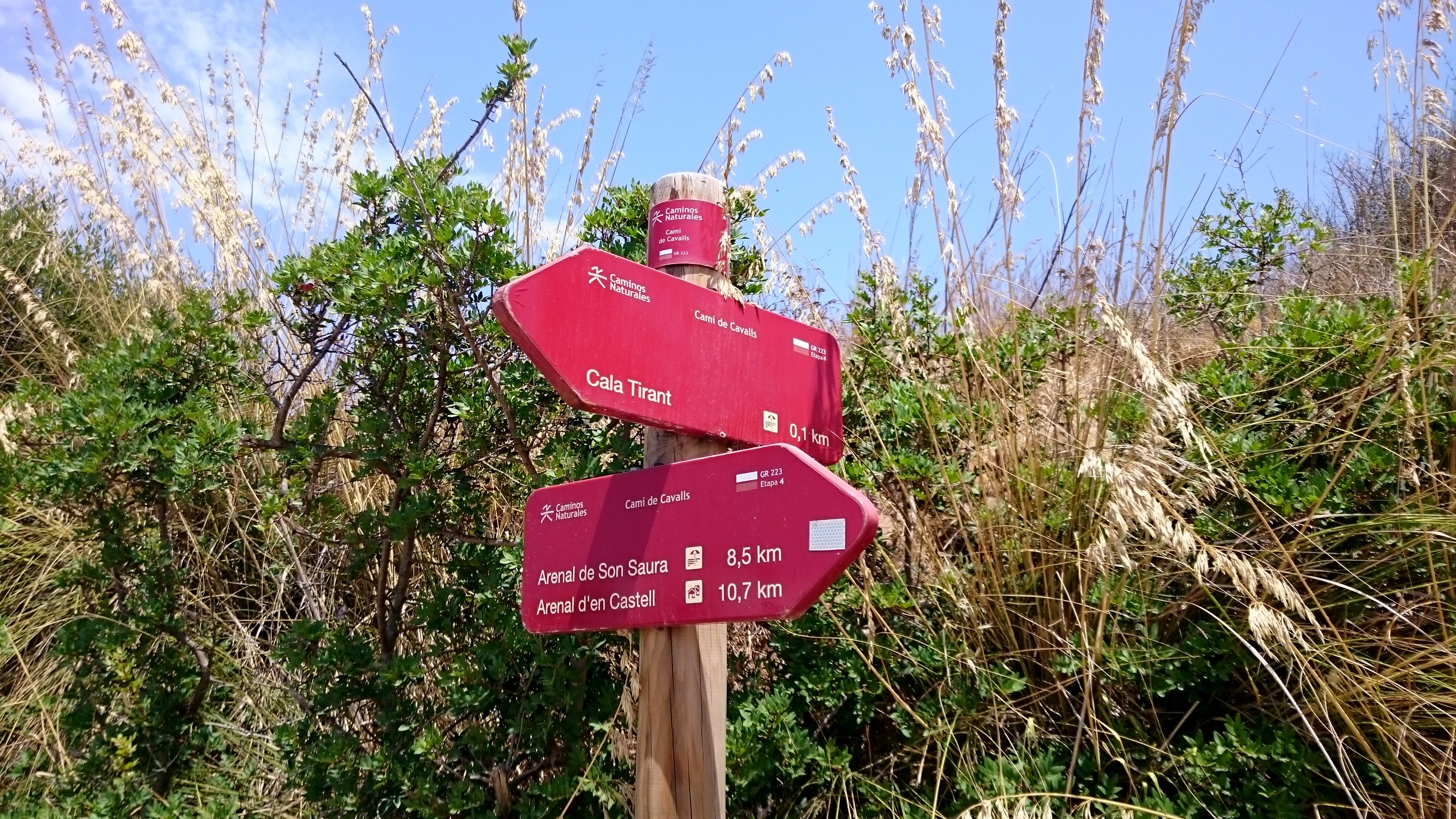
Camí de Cavalls sign. Stage 4, Platges de Fornells, close to Cala Tirant.

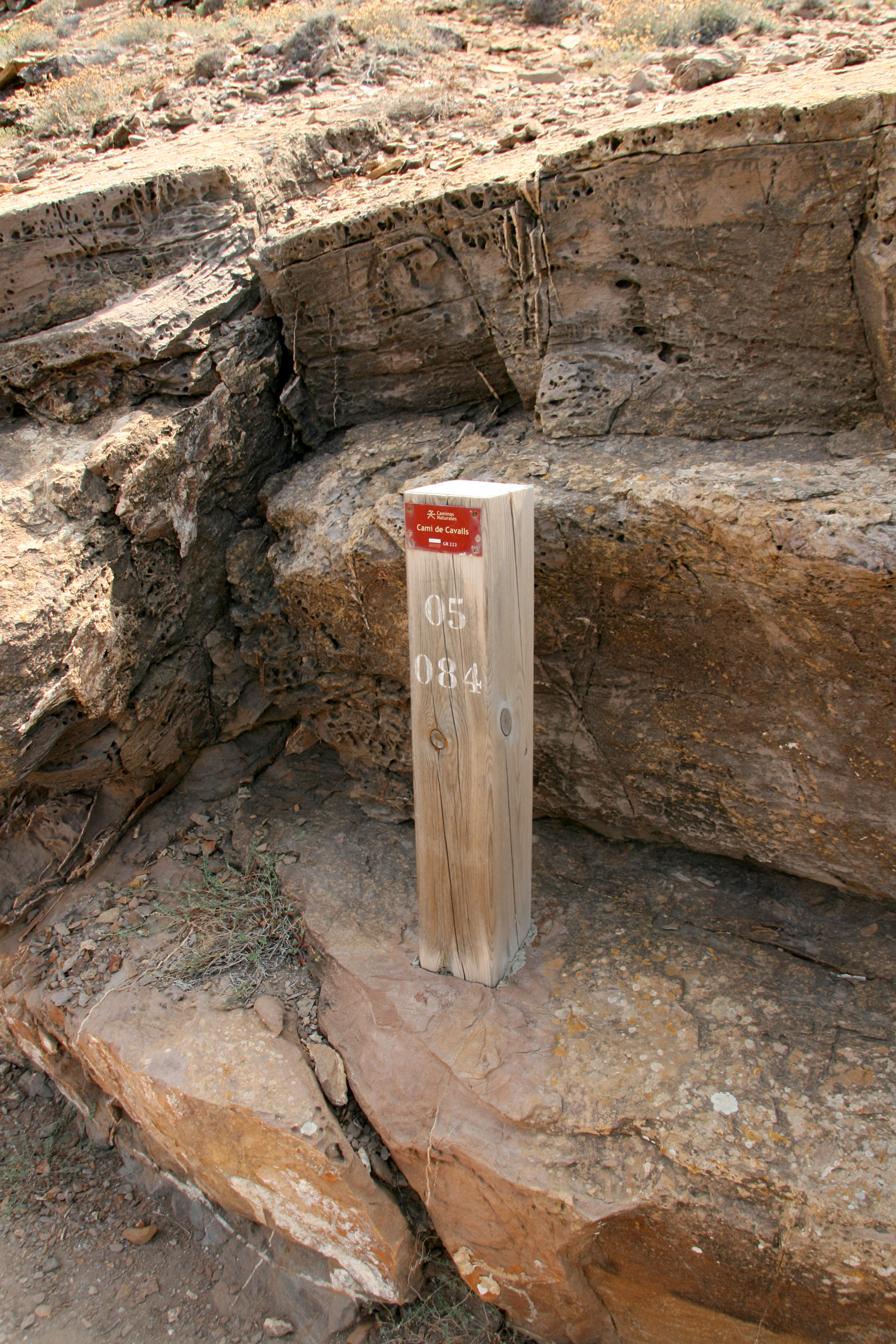
Camí de Cavalls sign. Stage 5, Platges de Cavalleria.

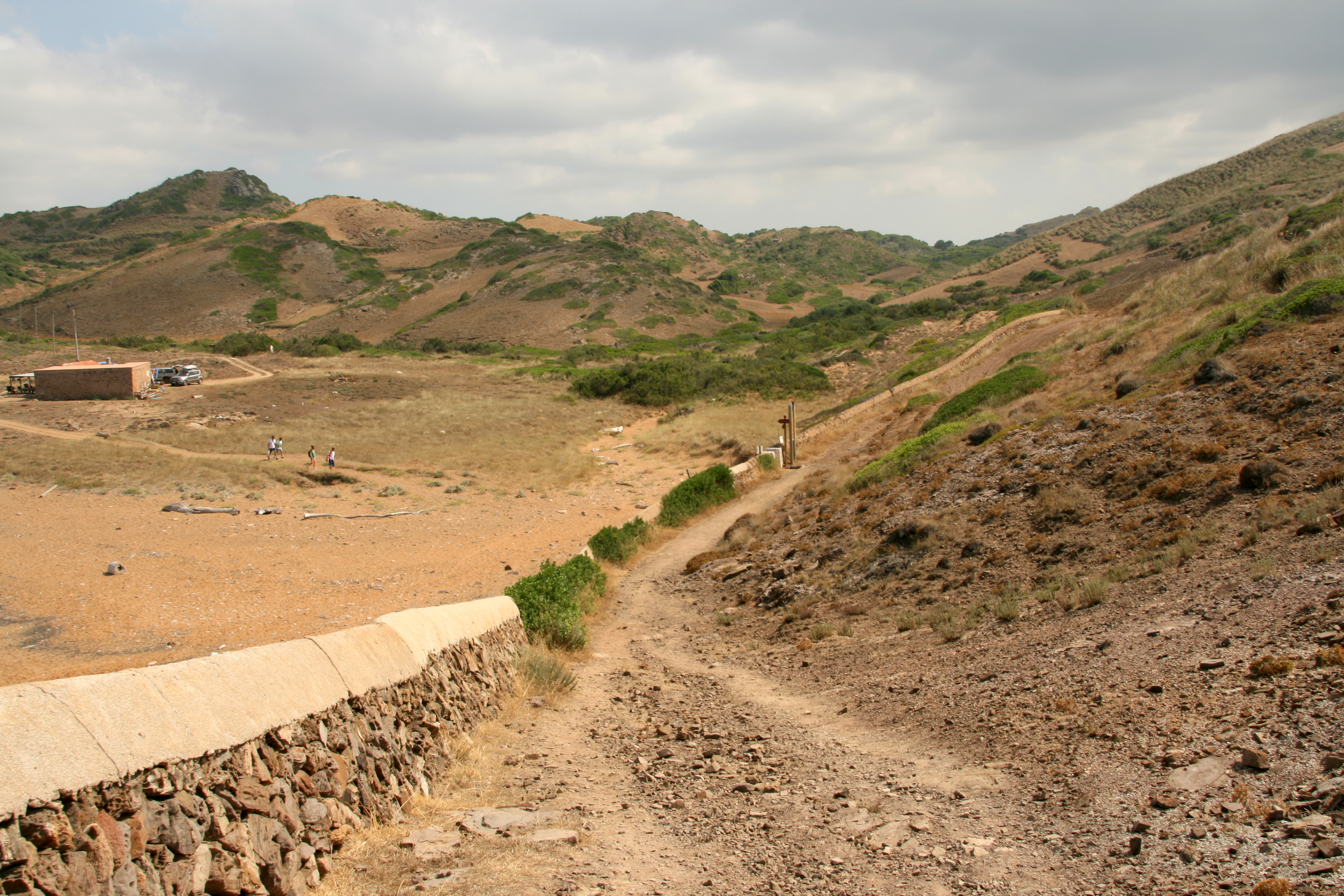
Camí de Cavalls. Stage 5, Cala Mica.

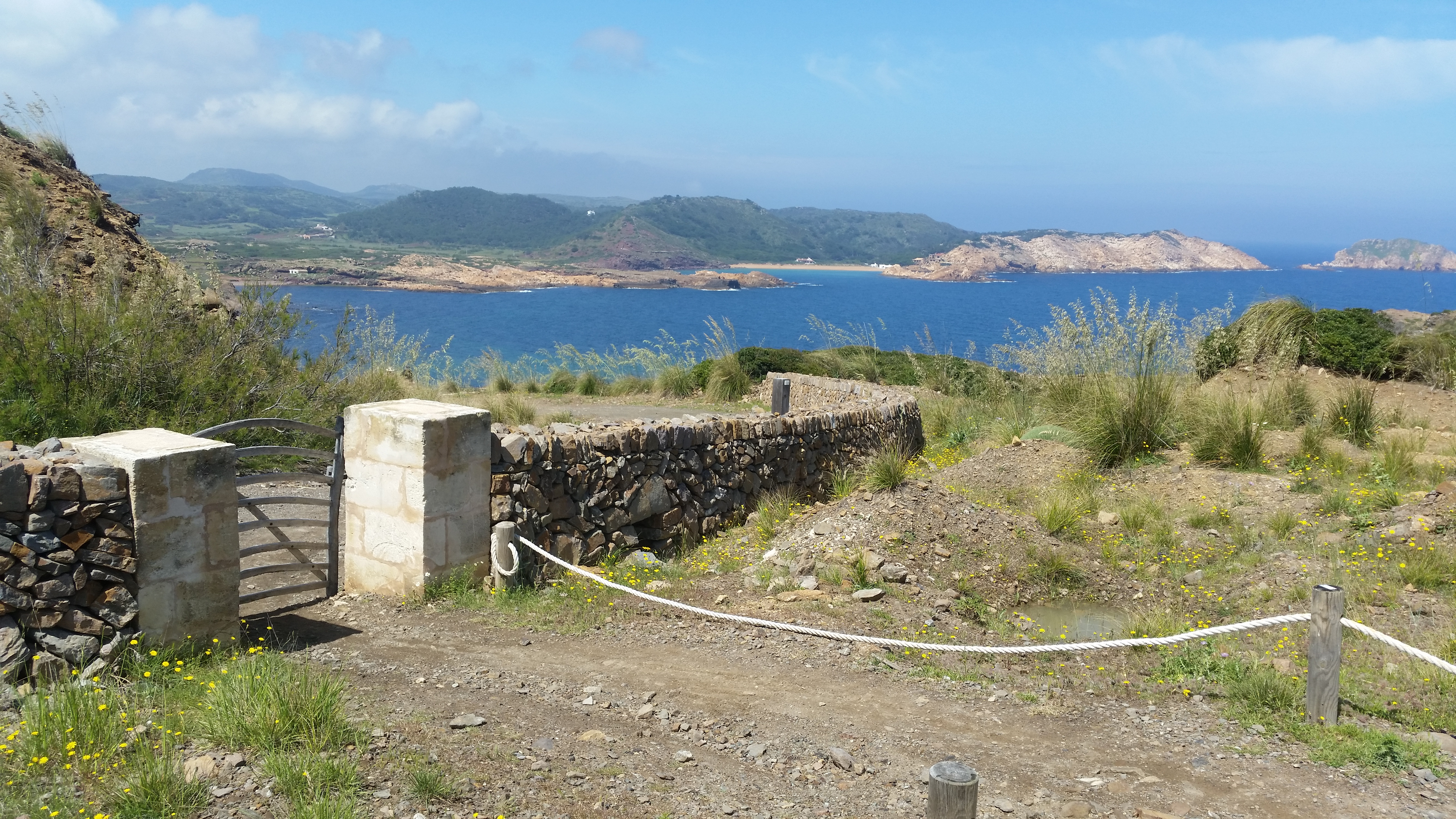
Camí de Cavalls. Stage 6, near Cala Pregonda.

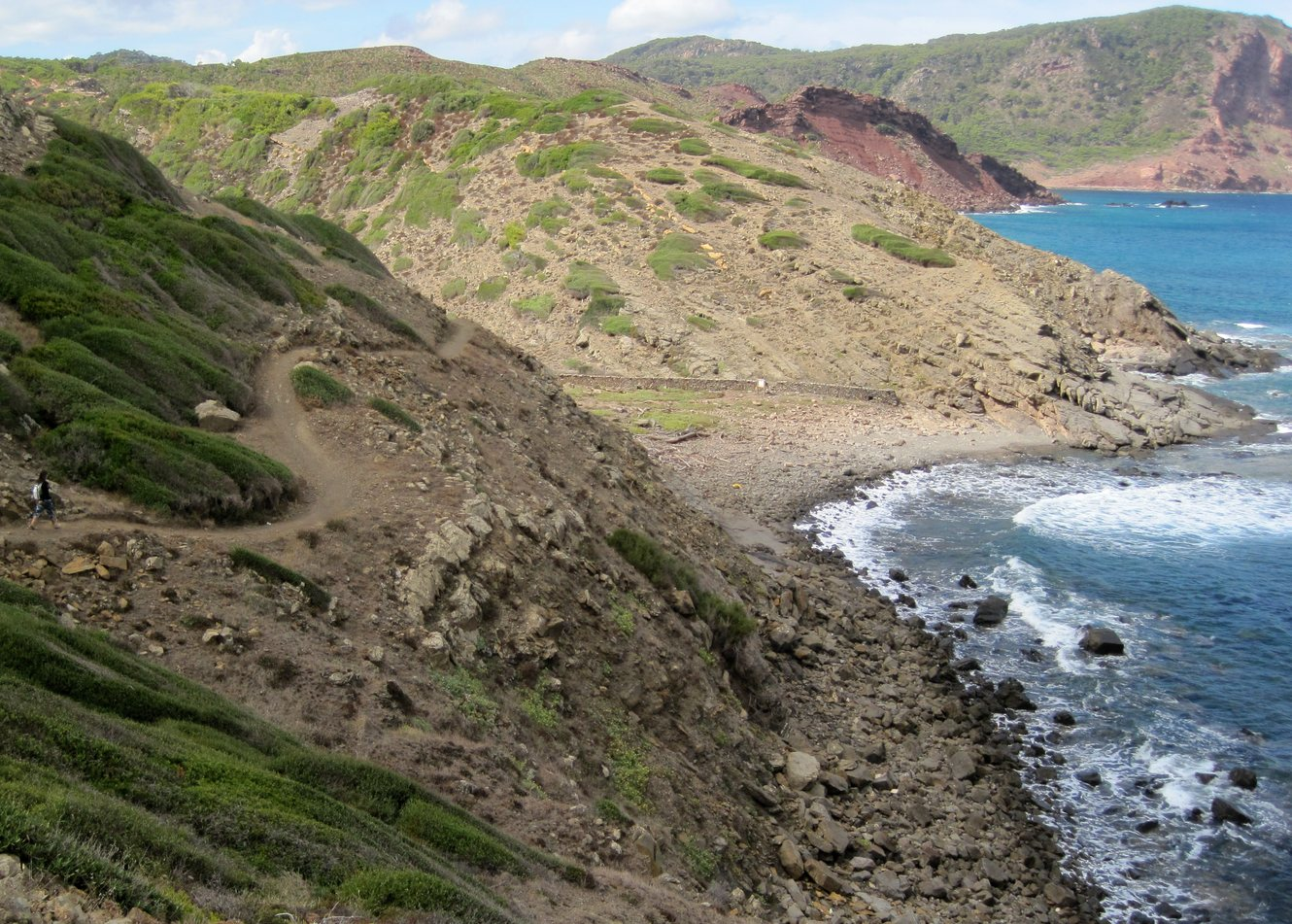
Camí de Cavalls. Stage 7, near Els Alocs

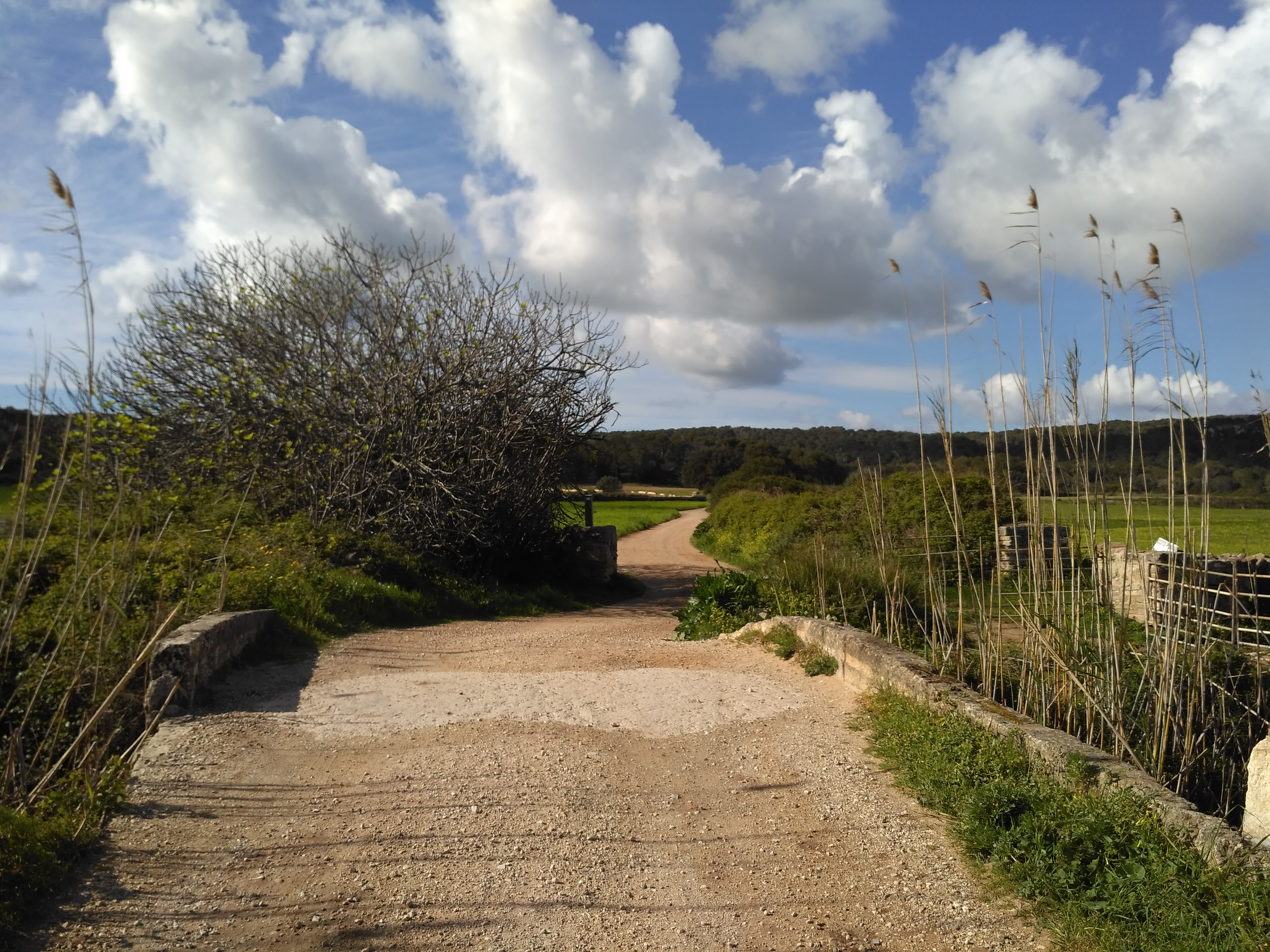
Camí de Cavalls. Stage 7, on the way to Cala Pilar

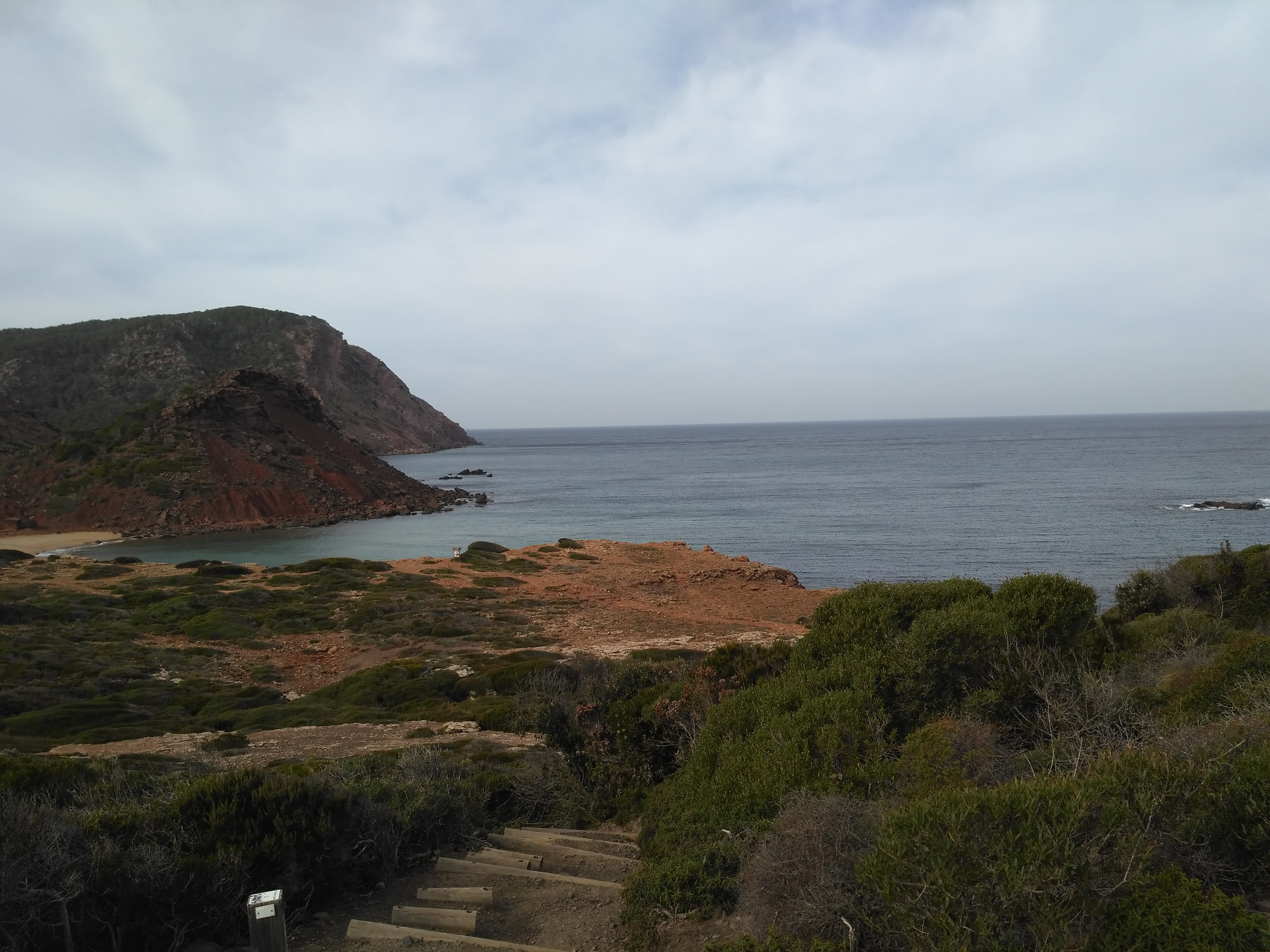
Camí de Cavalls. Stage 7, Cala Pilar

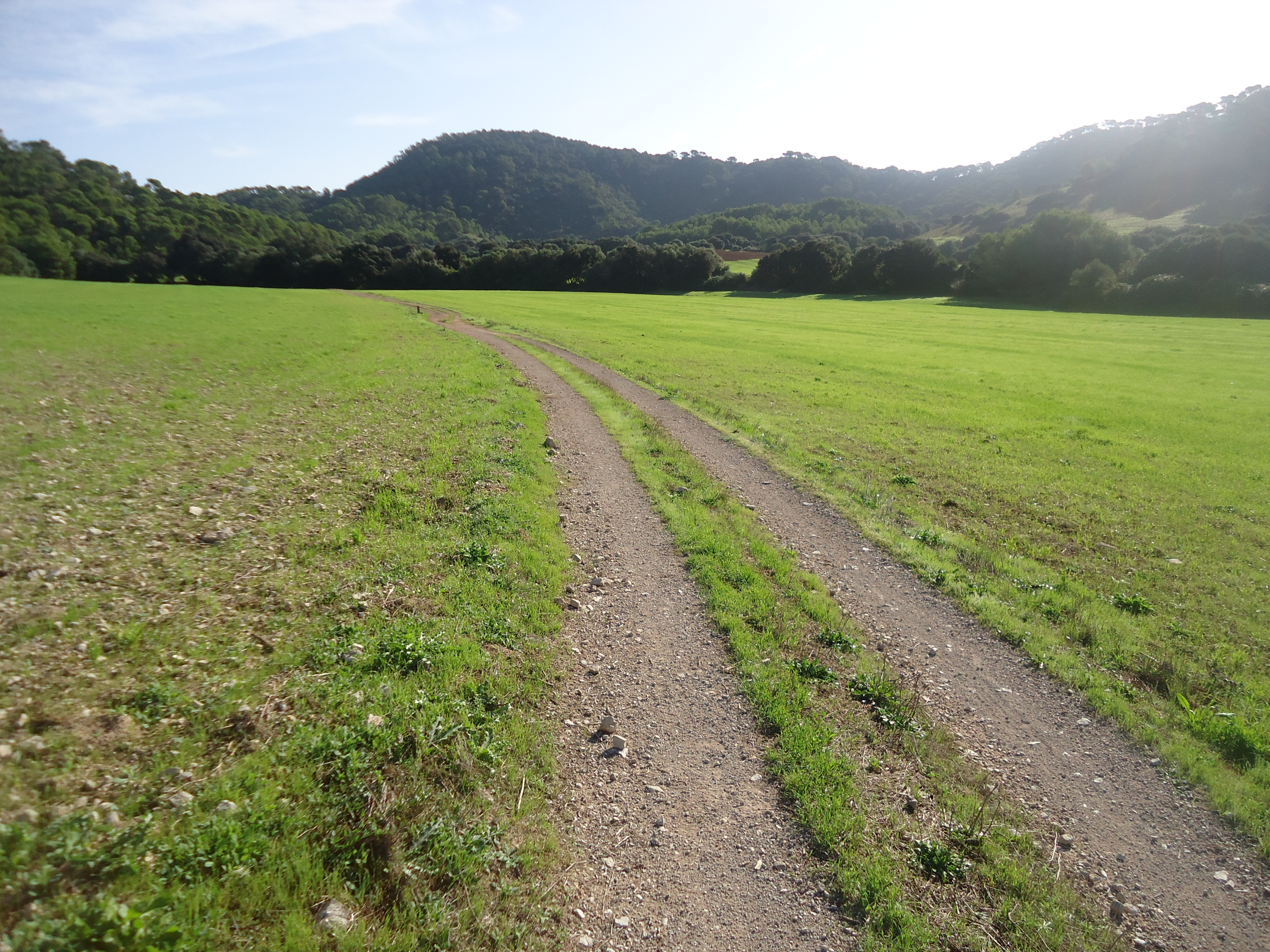
Camí de Cavalls. Stage 7, near Pla de Mar.

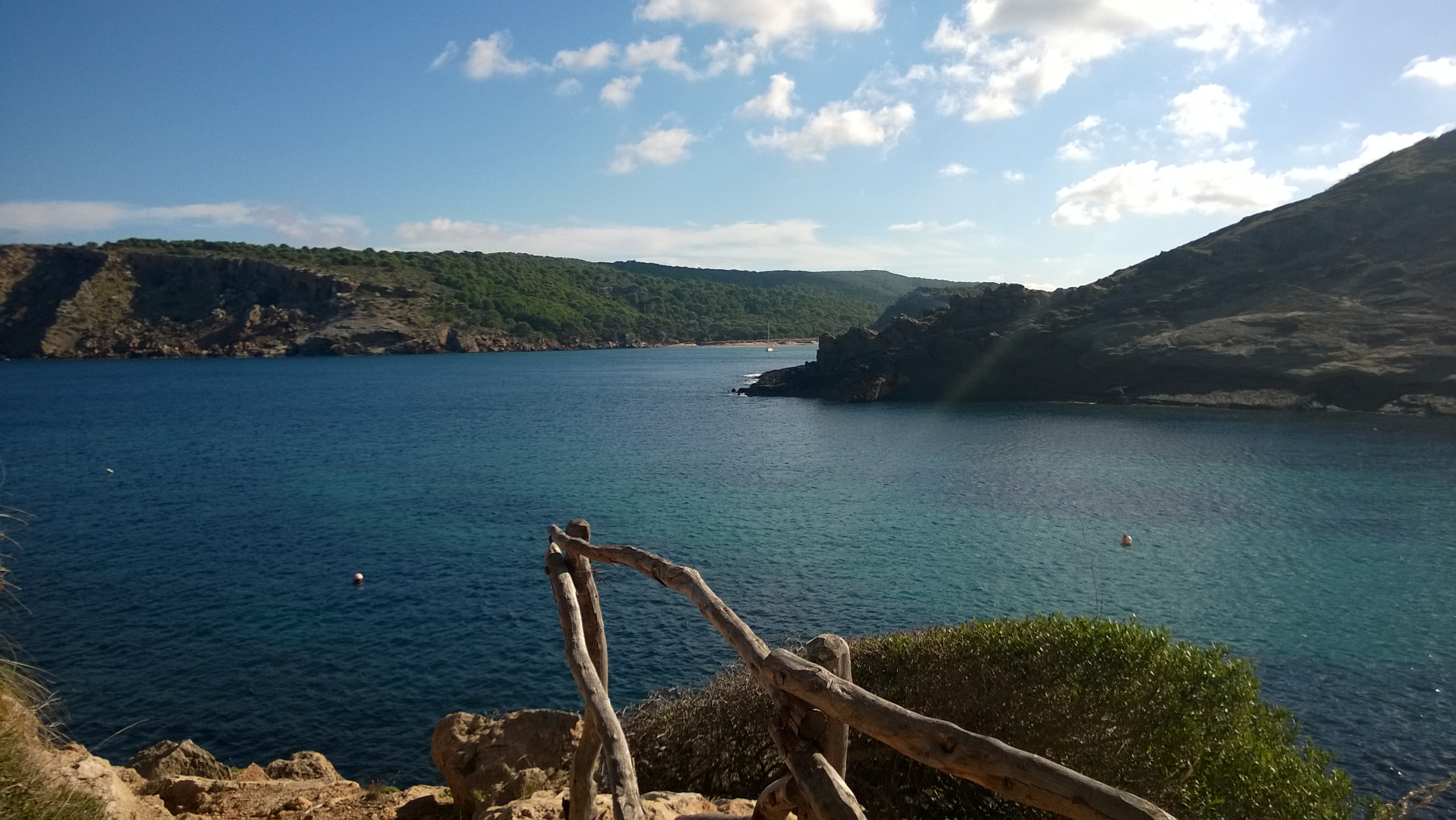
Camí de Cavalls. Stage 8, lookout in Ses Fontanelles.

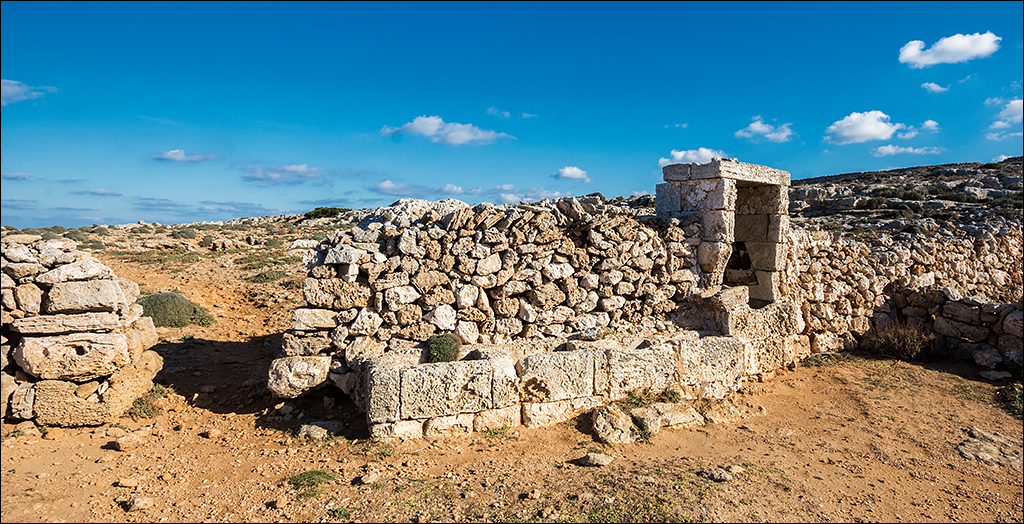
Camí de Cavalls. Stage 9, well and troughs near Punta Nati

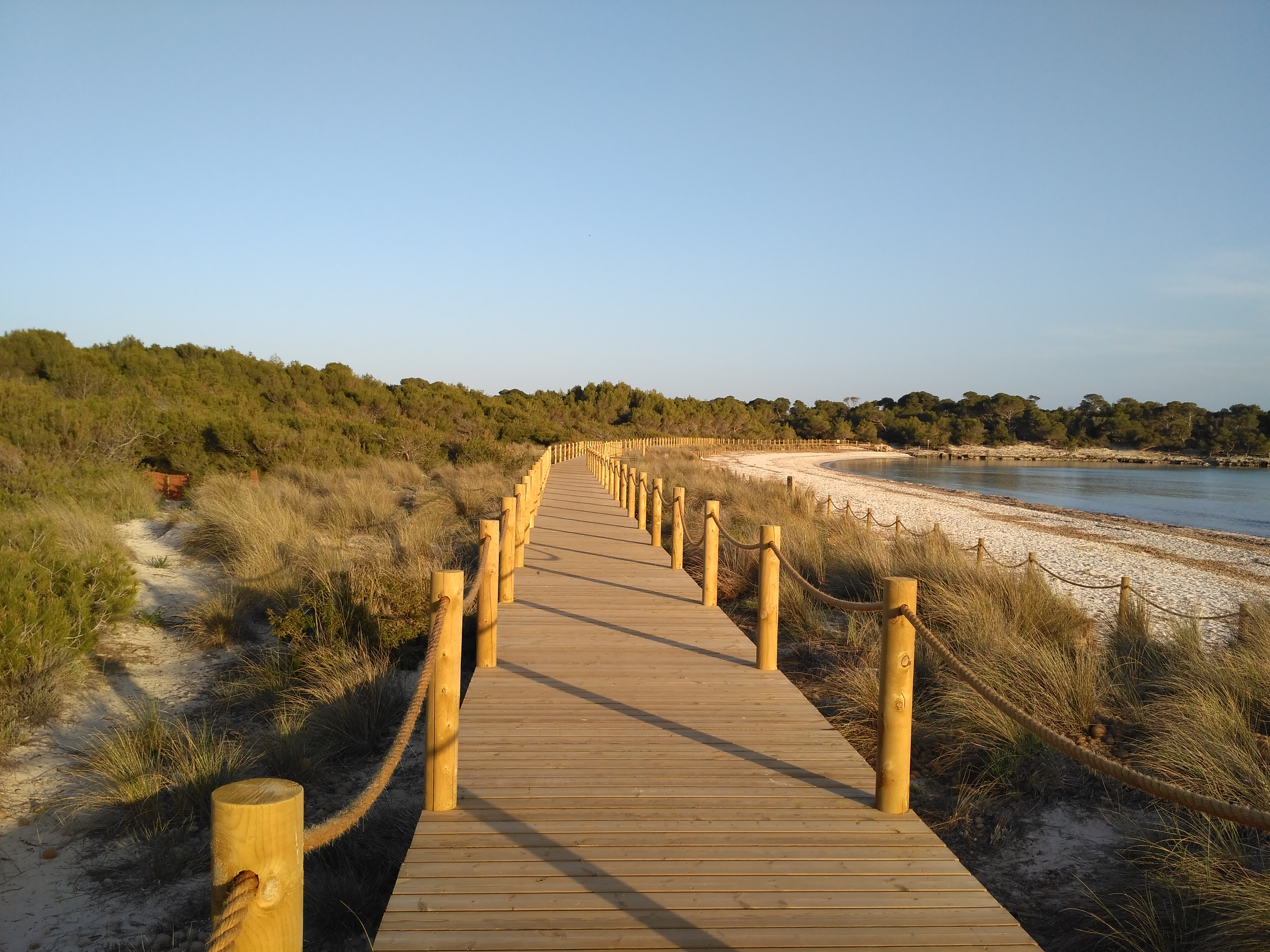
Camí de Cavalls. Stage 12, Son Saura.

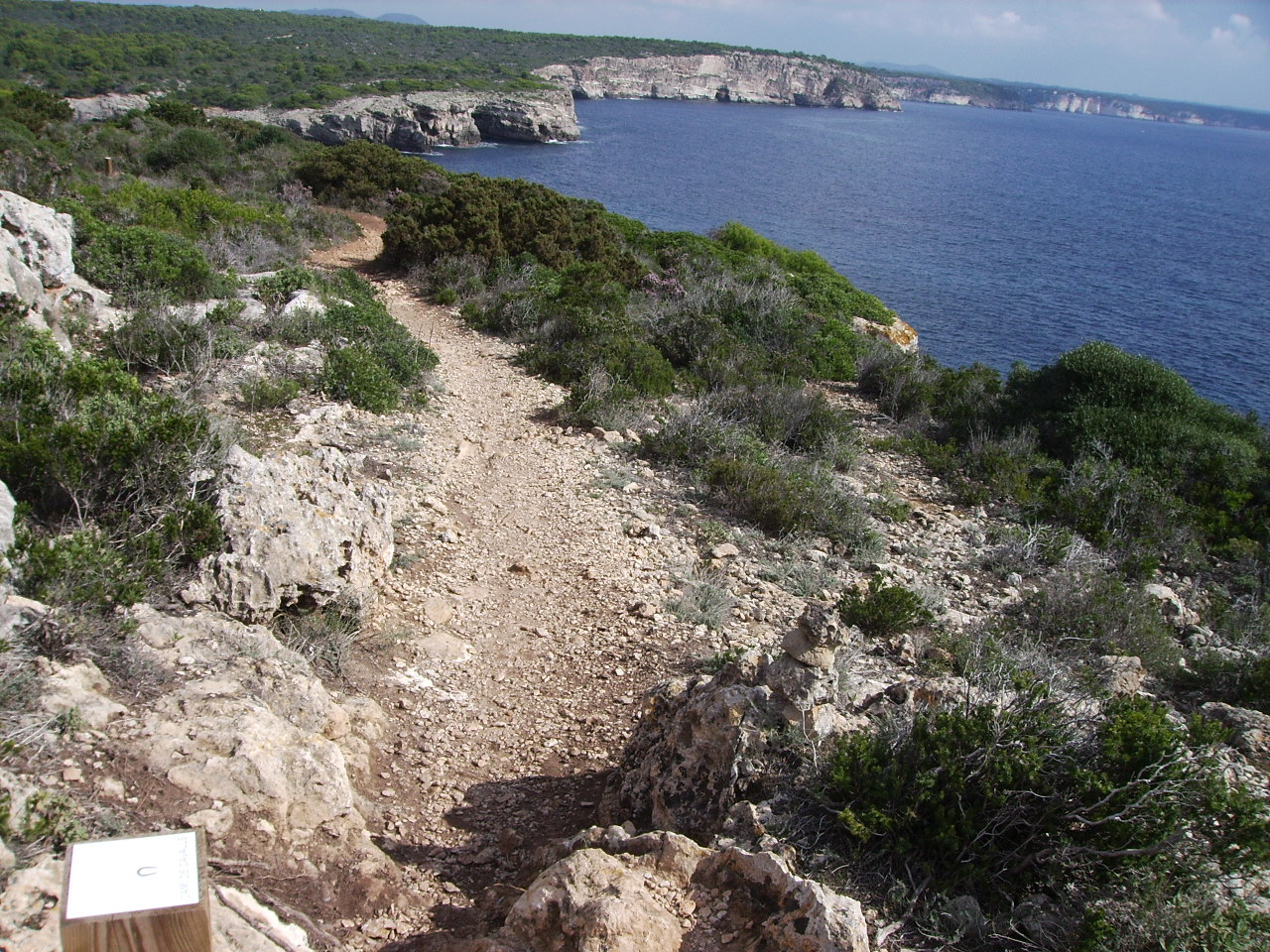
Camí de Cavalls. Stage 12, Es Talaier.

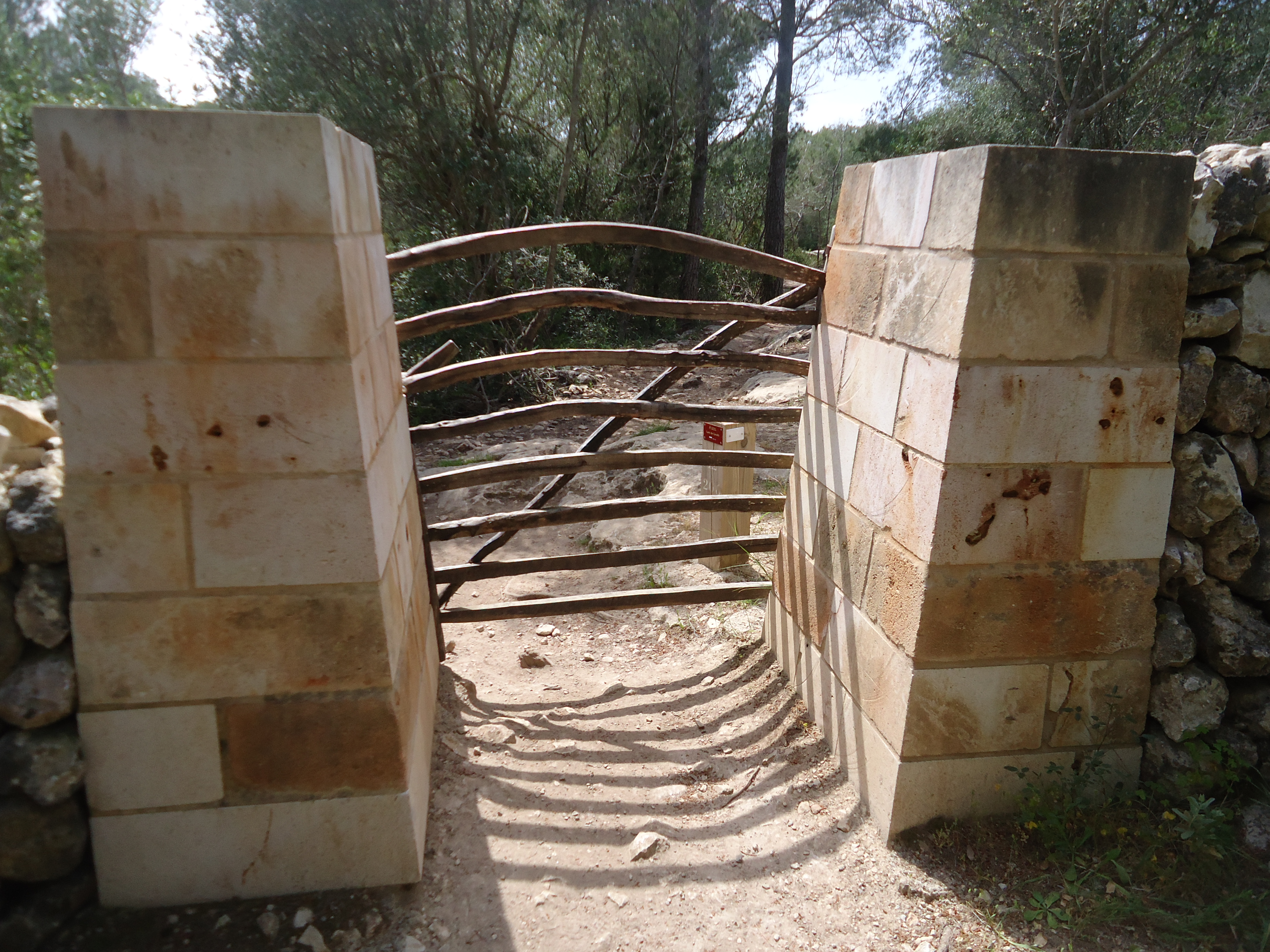
Camí de Cavalls. Stage 12, access to Cala Turqueta

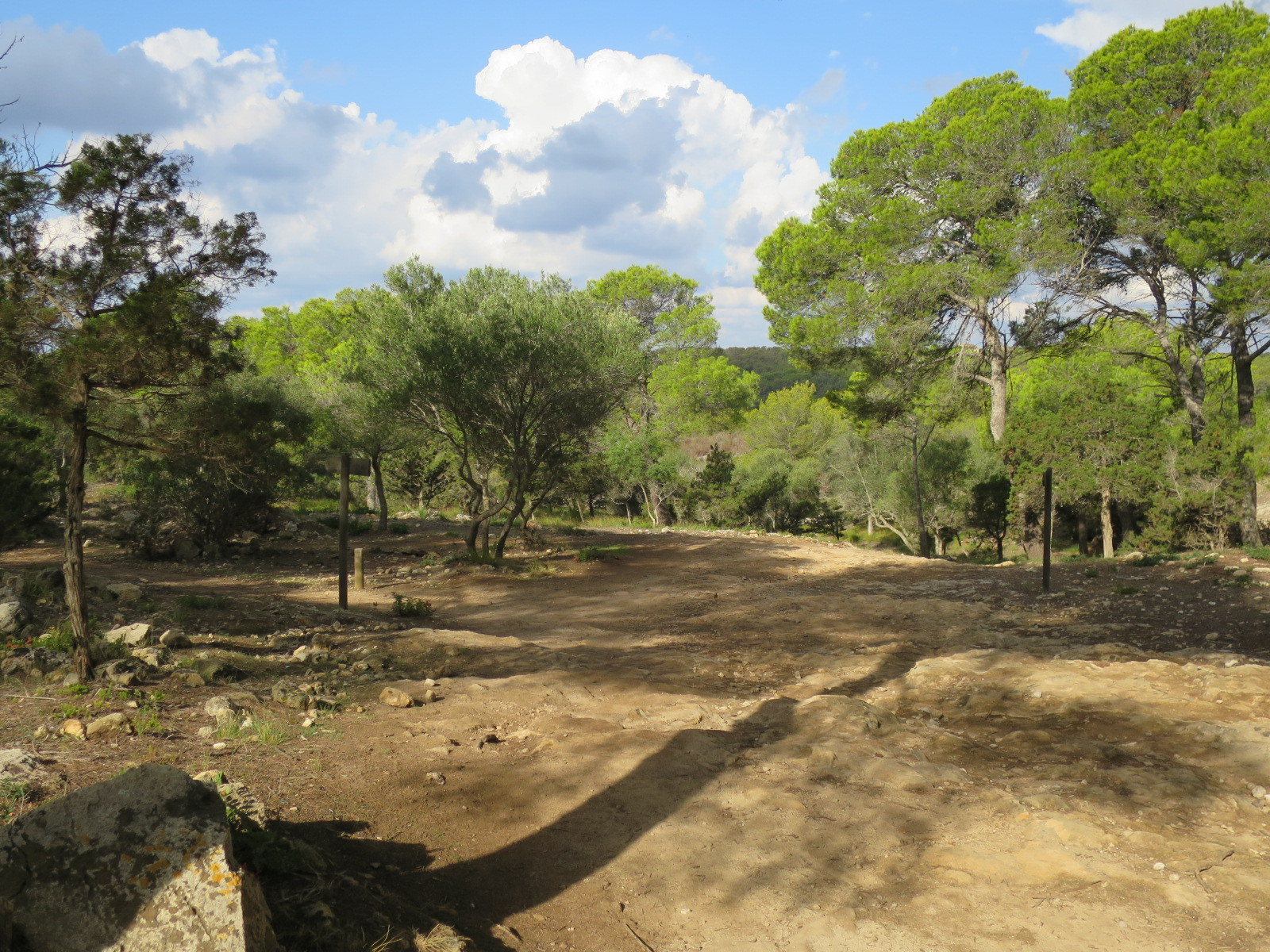
Camí de Cavalls. Stage 13, path to Macarella.

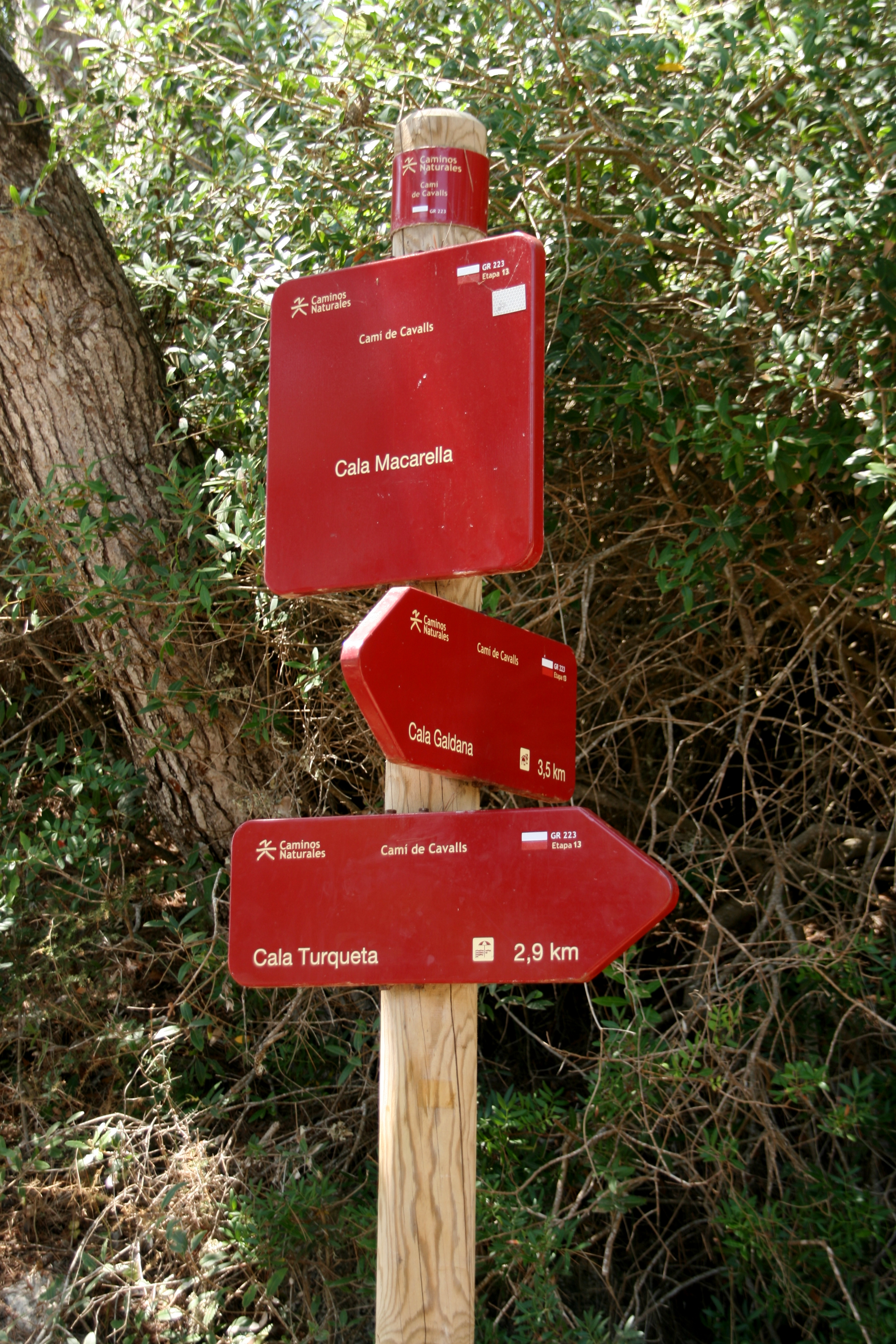
Camí de Cavalls sign. Stage 13, Macarella.

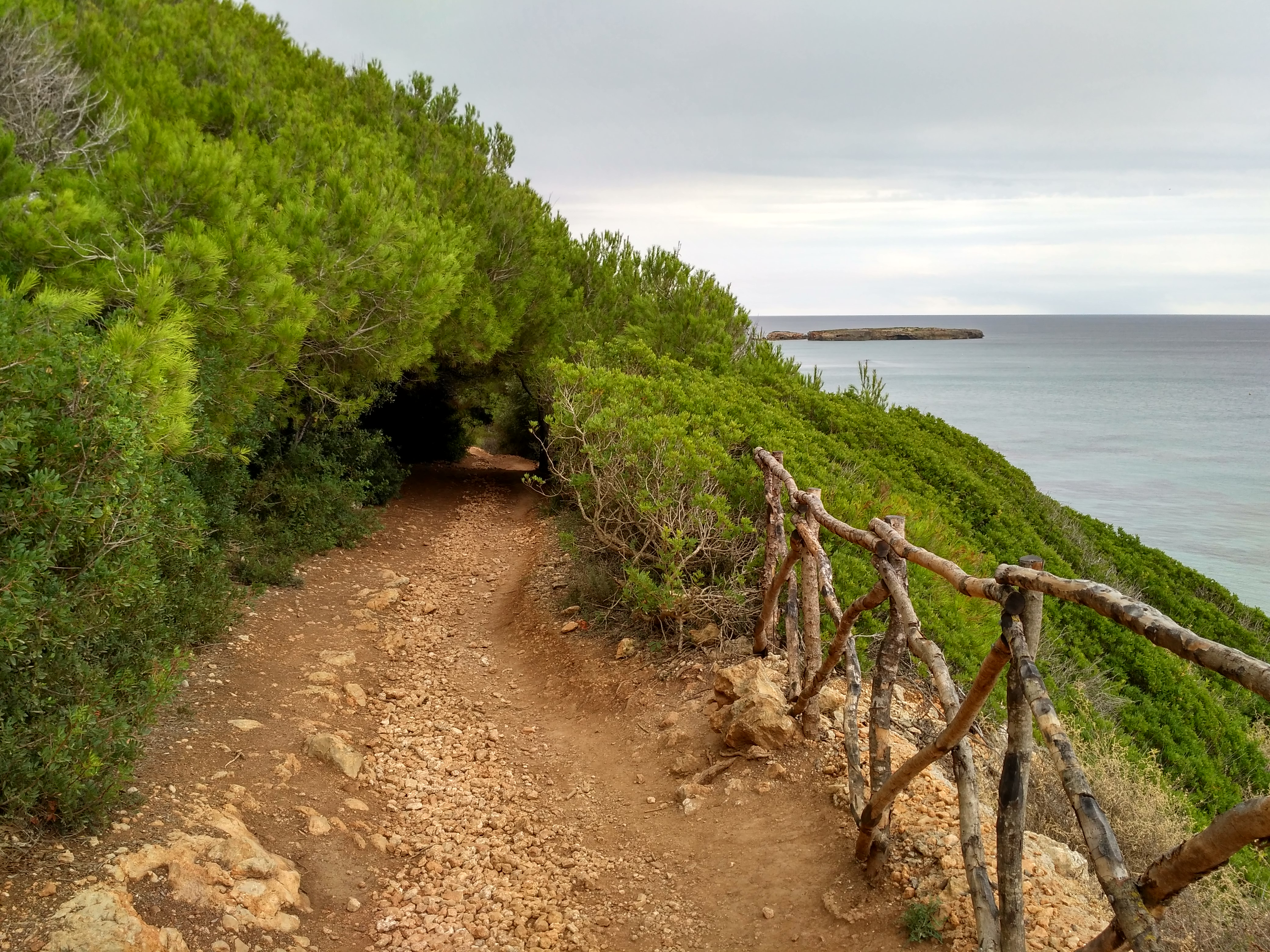
Camí de Cavalls. Stage 14, near Cala Escorxada.

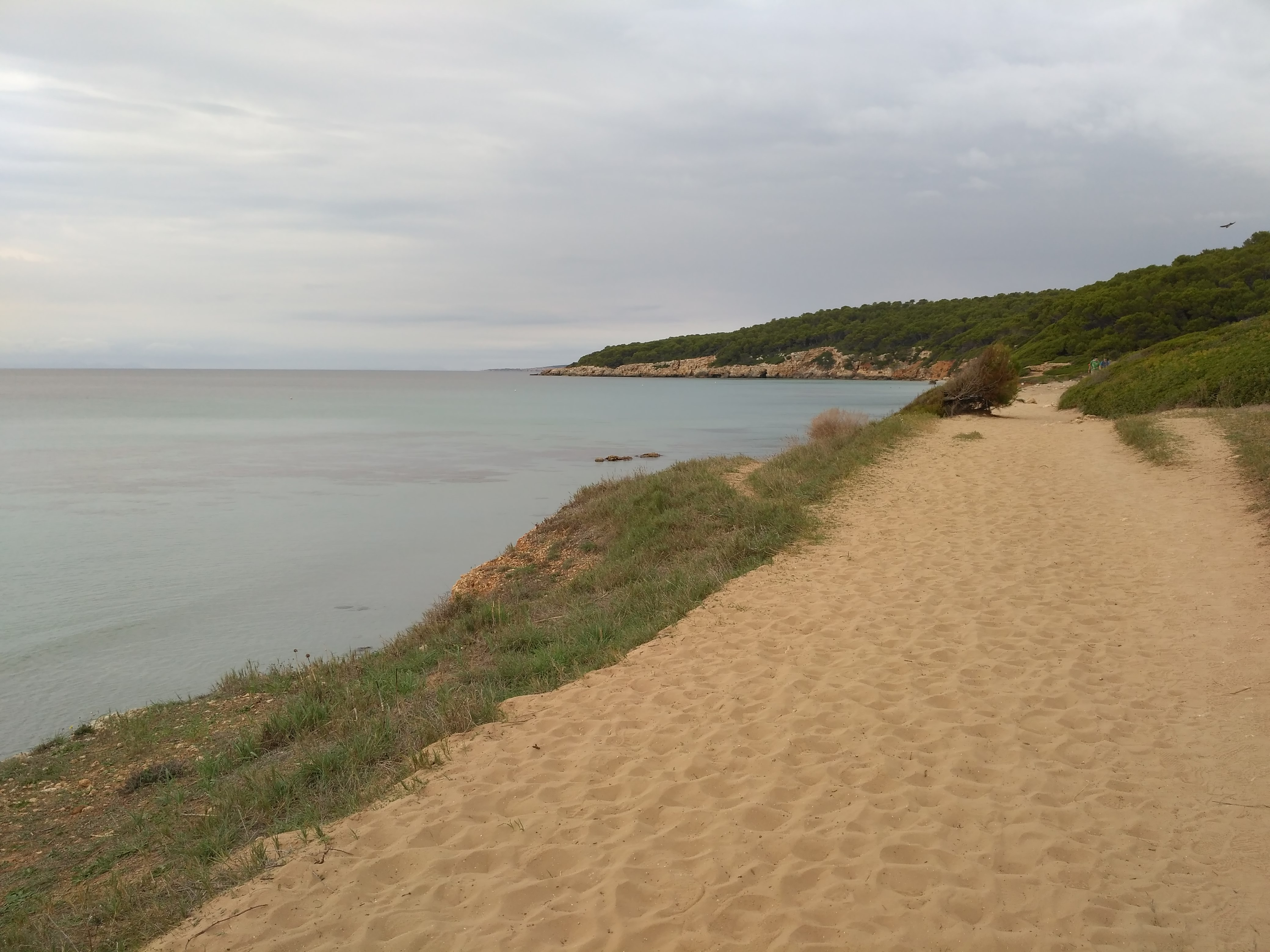
Camí de Cavalls. Stage 14, near Binigaus.

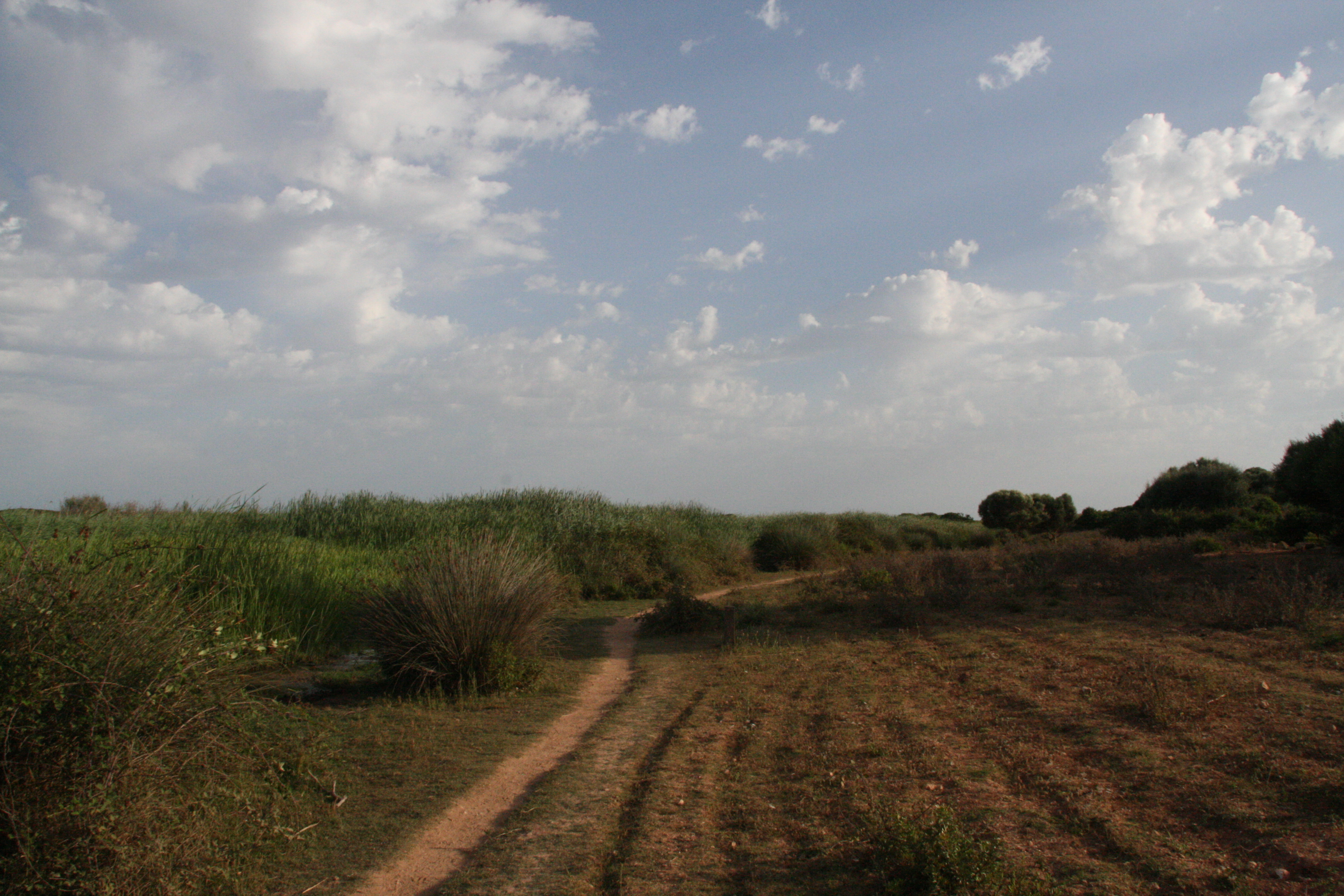
Camí de Cavalls. Stage 15, Barranc de Son Boter o de sa Vall.

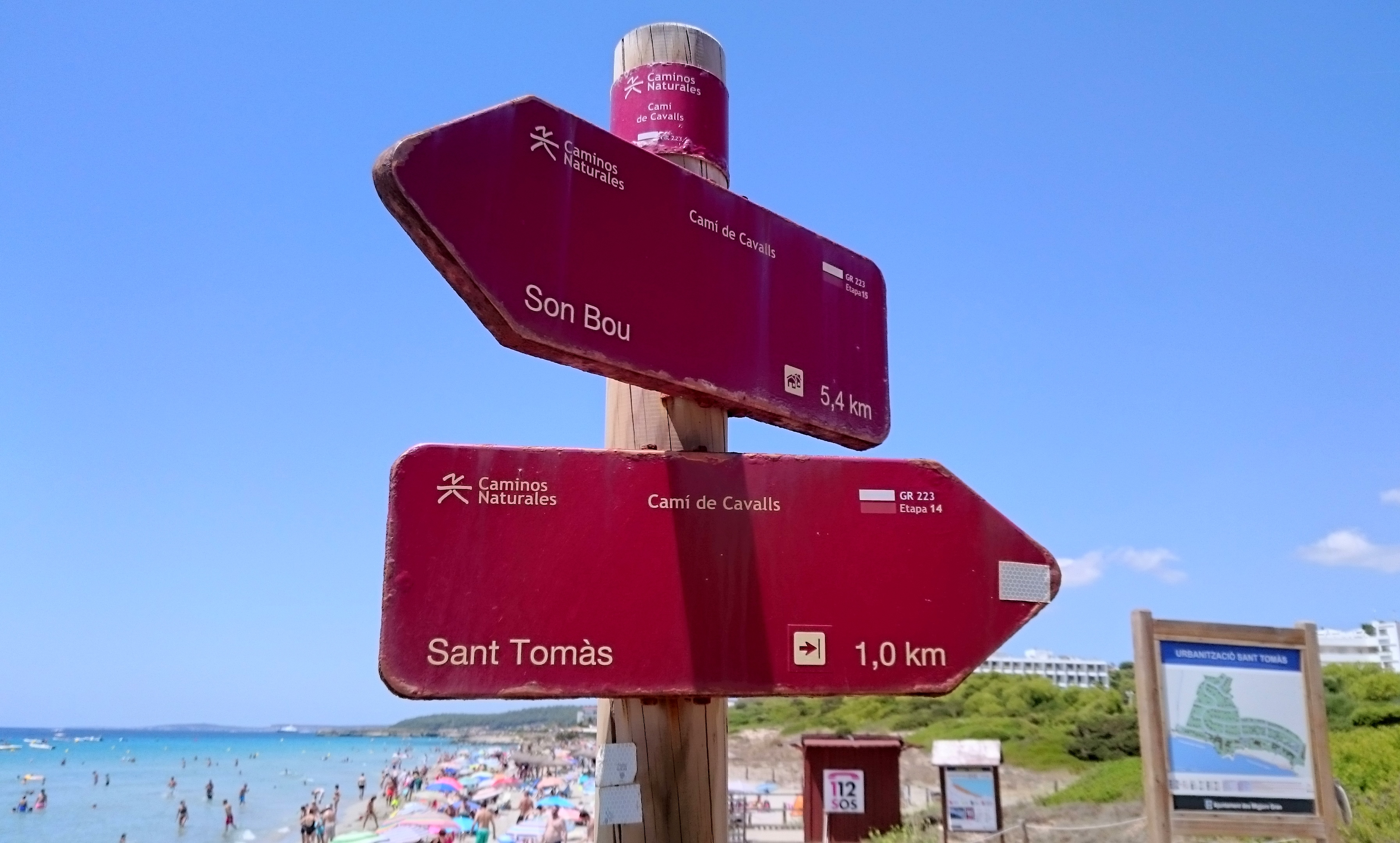
Camí de Cavalls sign. Stage 15, Sant Tomàs.

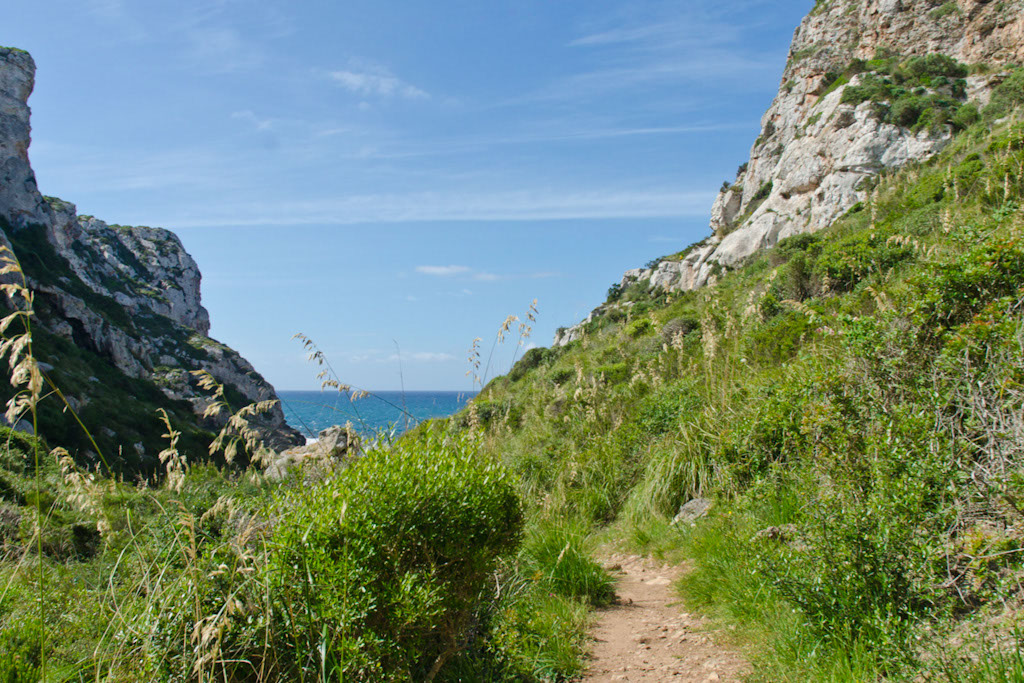
Camí de Cavalls. Stage 16, Cala Llucalari.

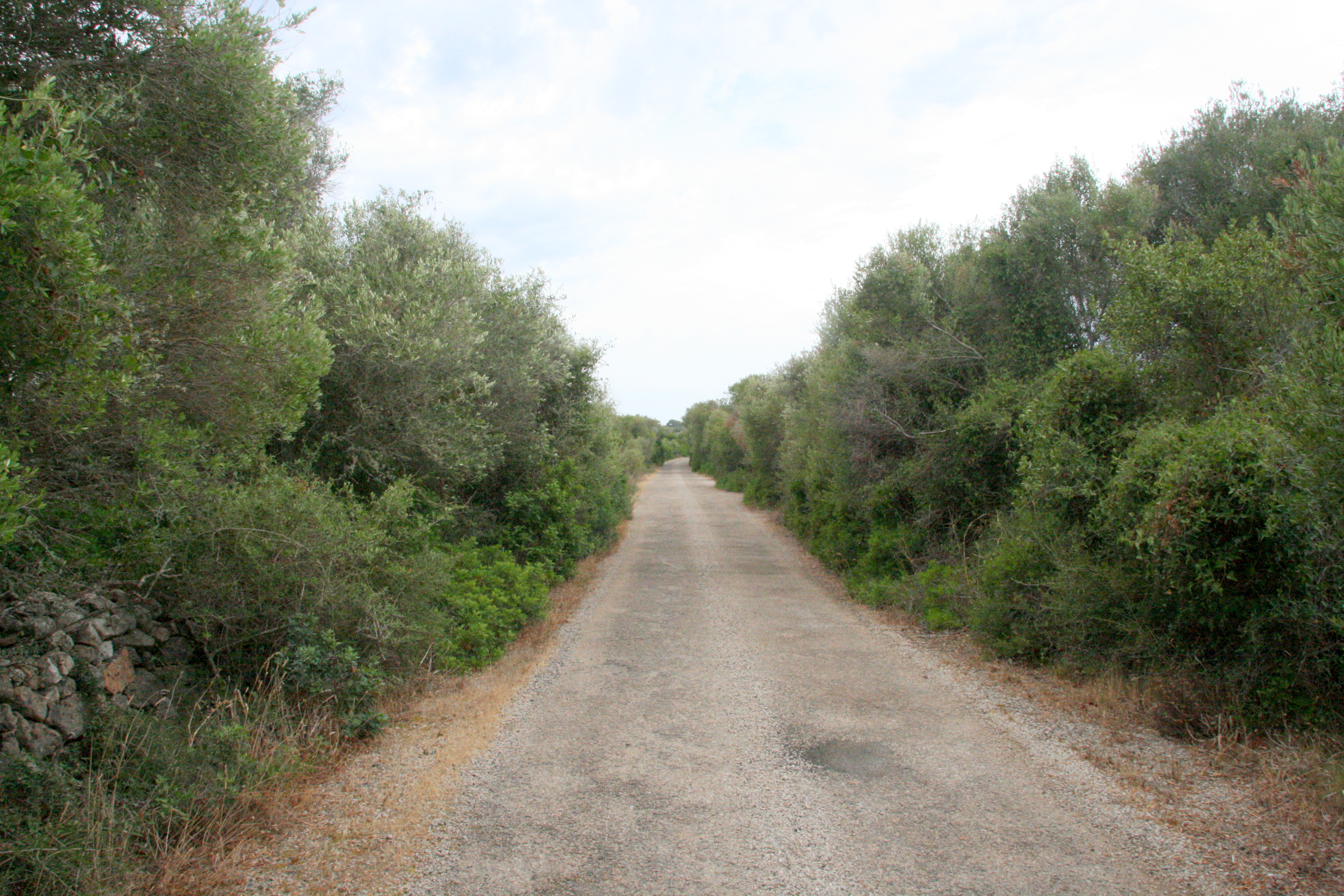
Camí de Cavalls. Stage 16, Llucalari.

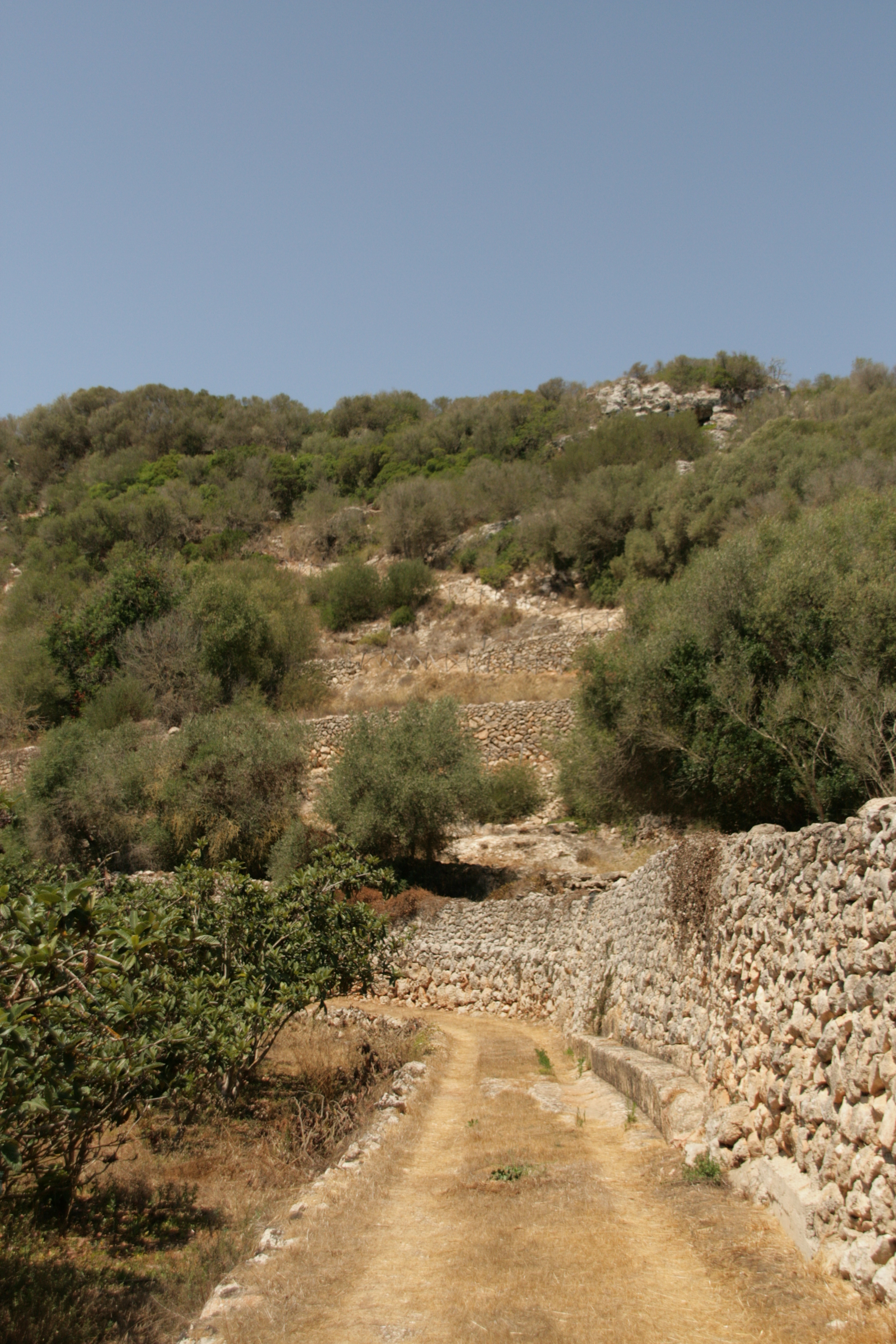
Camí de Cavalls. Stage 16, Barranc de Cala en Porter.

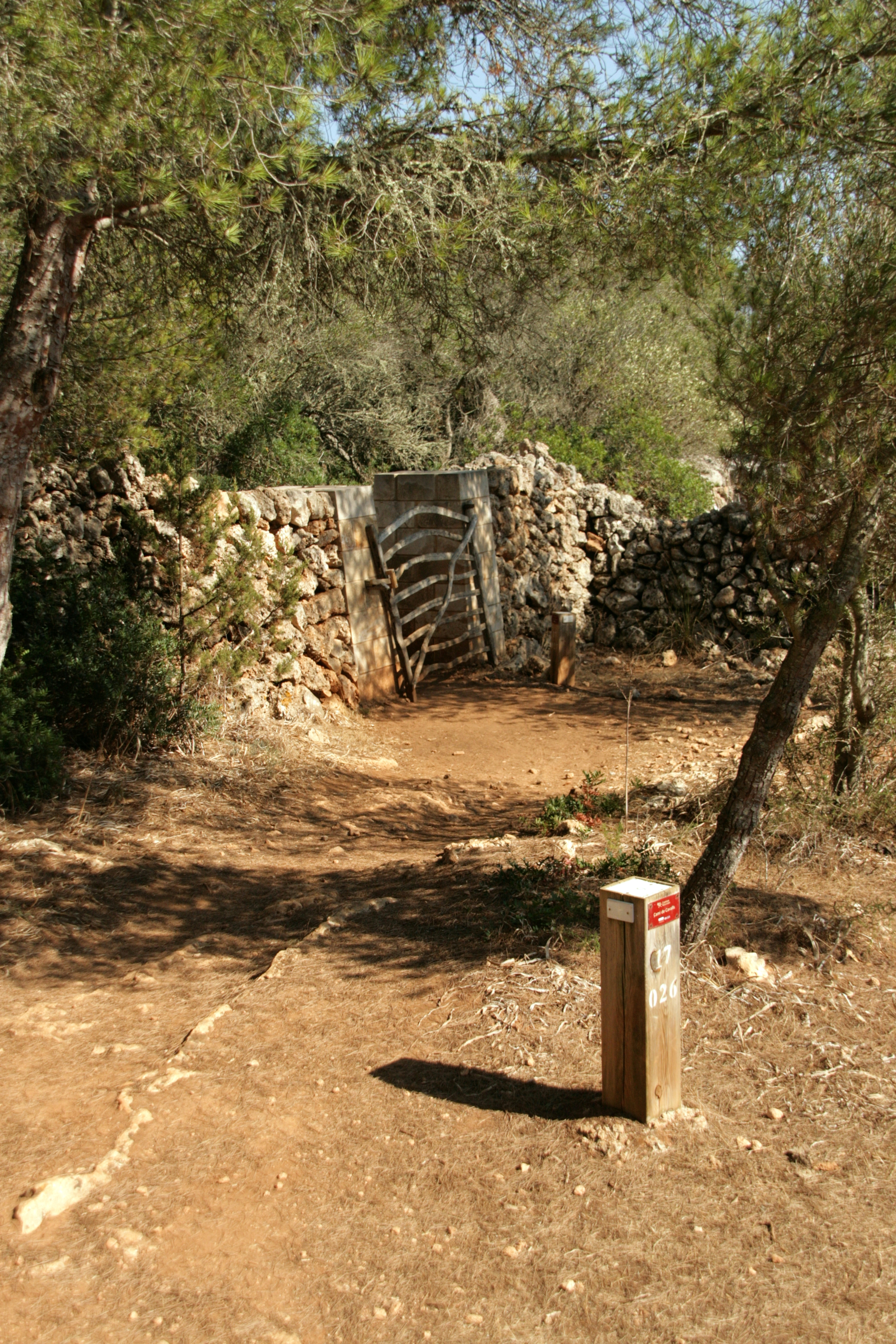
Camí de Cavalls sign. Stage 17, near Cales Coves.

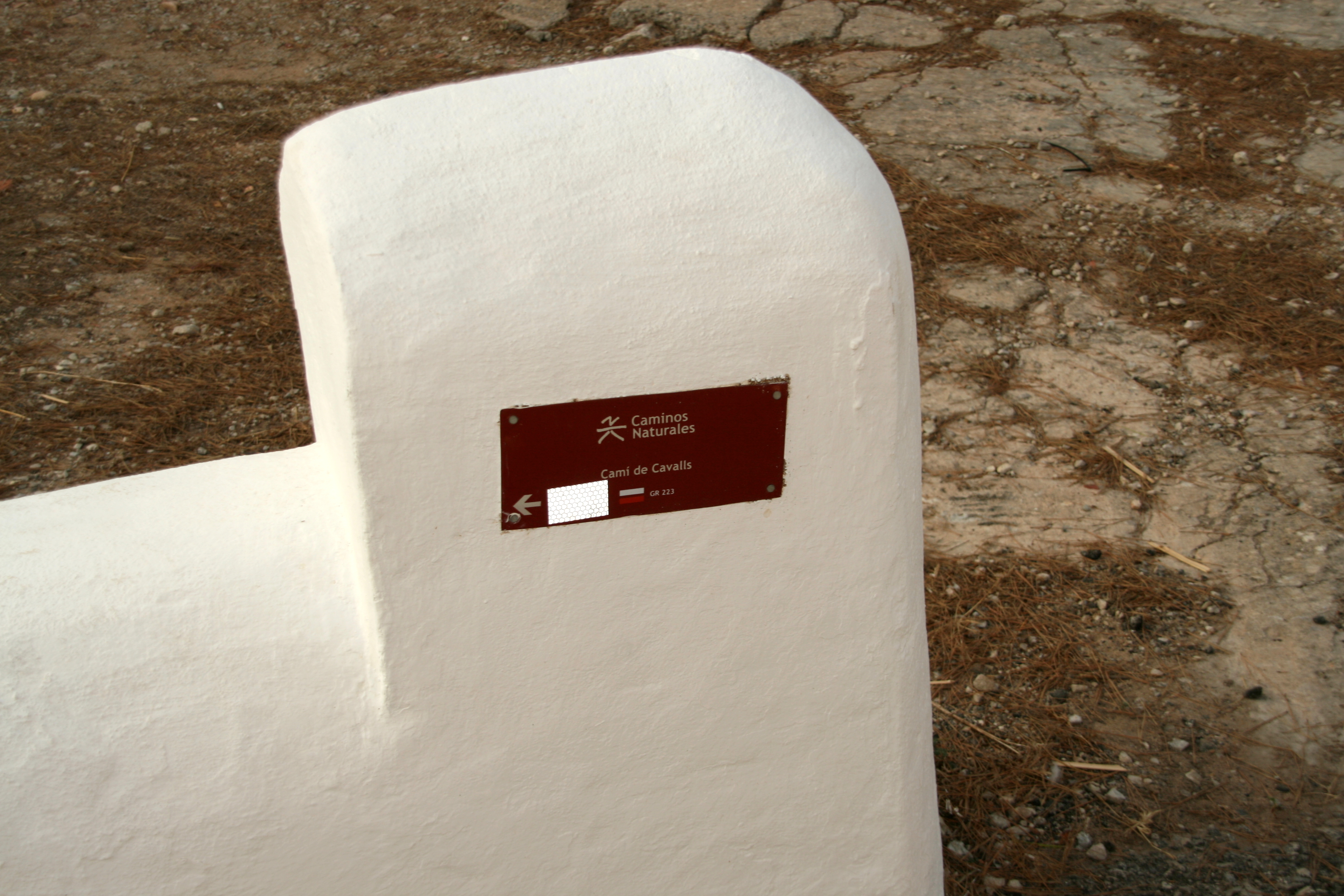
Camí de Cavalls sign. Stage 18, Binibèquer.

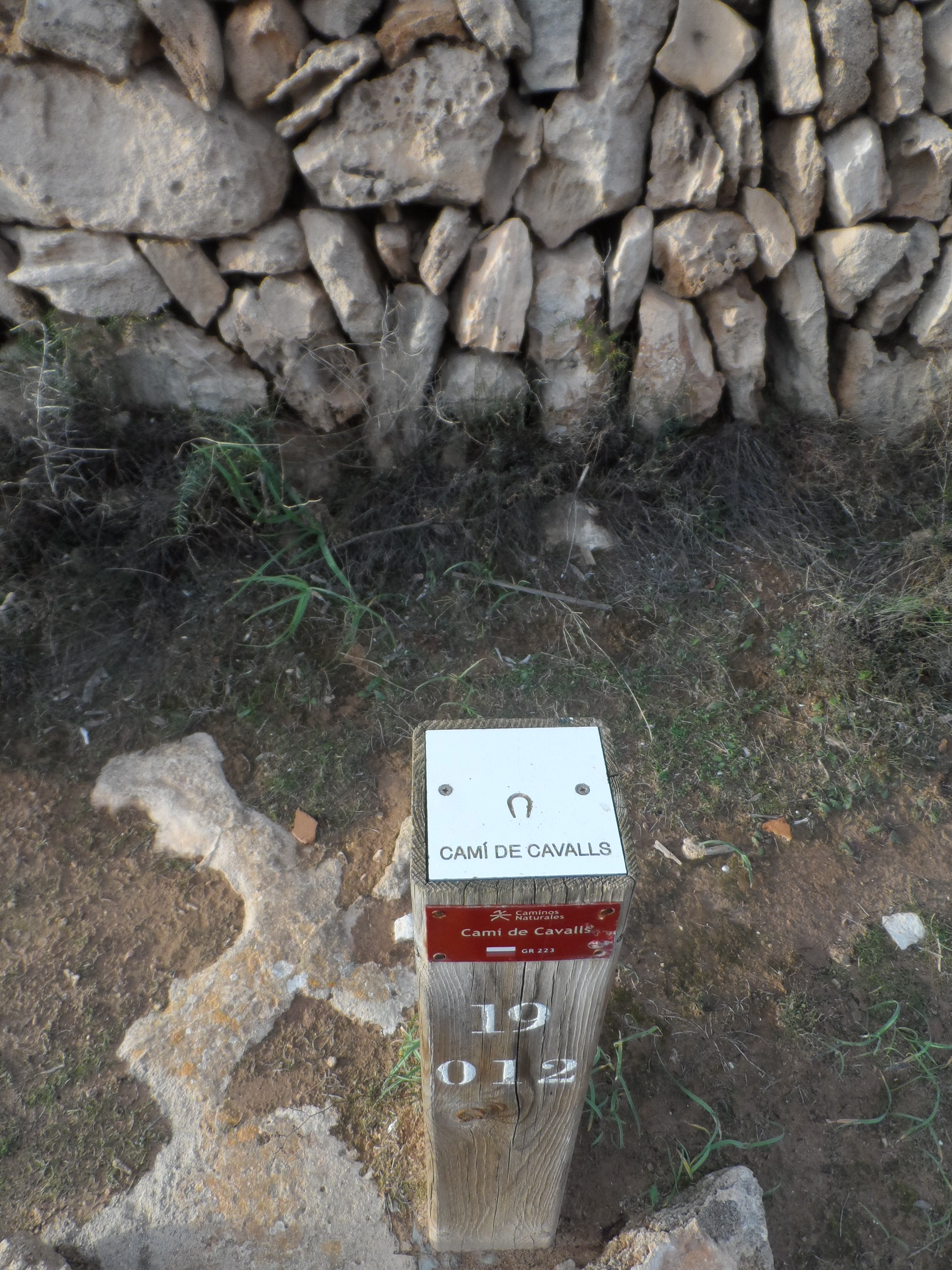
Camí de Cavalls sign. Stage 19.

== Events ==
Since the whole path is restored, activities and events around it are arising. Between April 28, 2012 and May 1, 2012, the world champion in adventure racing Arnau Julià went in 82 h 30 min three times around the path, one running, one in mountain-bike and the last one in kayak, covering in total more than 500 km (310 miles).

The Trail Menorca Camí de Cavalls was held for the first time between 18 and 20 May 2012 and 140 participants took part in the five different races of this event: Trail Cami de Cavalls 185.3 km, Trail Costa Nord – 94.2 km (North coast only), Trail Costa Sud – 91 km (south coast only), Trekking Costa Nord – 46.6 km and Trekking Costa Sud – 43.5 km.
