= Sa Torreta =

Hill in Ibiza, Spain

Coordinates: 39.052°N 1.516°E

Sa Torreta (Spanish: Furnas) is the highest point, at 416 m (1,365 ft), in the northern portion of Ibiza. It is part of the Serra de Sant Vicent, the hills which extend across the northern part of the island from the north east coast at Cala de Sant Vicent to the north west coast at Port de Sant Miguel.

The name Sa Torreta is used for a number of hotels and restaurants in Ibiza including one in Ibiza Old Town.
