= Cala Xuclar =

Beach on Ibiza, Spain

- Beach
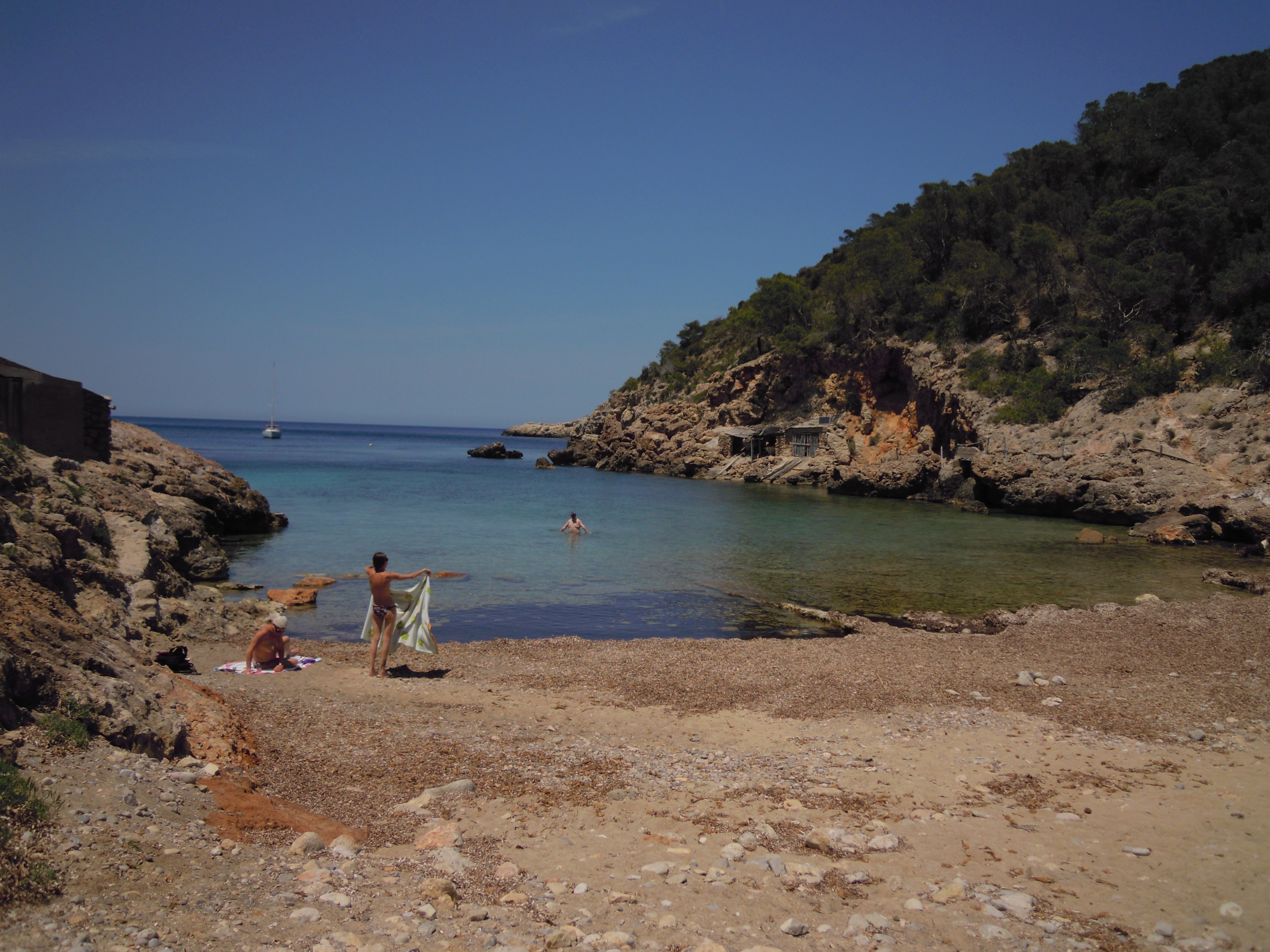
- Cala Xuclar

- Location of Cala Xuclar on Ibiza
- Coordinates: 39°6′8″N 1°30′33″E
- Location: Sant Joan de Labritja, Ibiza, Spain

Cala Xuclar (pronounced in eivissenc choocla) is a beach in the northern part of the Spanish island of Ibiza. It is in the municipality of Sant Joan de Labritja and is 3.8 miles (6.1 km) north of the village of Sant Joan de Labritja, and 1.2 miles (1.9 km) west of the beach resort of Portinatx.

== Description ==
The beach of Cala Xuclar is set in a very small cove surrounded by cliffs and is at the head of a seasonal river. This is one of the best get-away-from-it-all beaches on the island. The small bay is excellent for snorkelling and you enjoy the richness of underwater fauna and flora living in its crystal waters of this cove. On both side of the cove there are several rustic fishermens' huts and at the water line there are some sea caves. From the cove there are walks along the cliffs paths through the pine woods that clad the cliff tops here. During July and August there is a small snack bar (chiringuito) which serves visitors a selection of locally-caught fish and tapas such as Alioli potatoes.

=== Getting There ===
Leave Portinatx on the EI-300 road and after 1.1 miles (1.8 km) watch out for the small signpost on the left just after the S' Illot d'es Rencli bay. From here there is a very steep rutted dirt track down to the cove. There is very limited parking space available, which will get very full at the height of the season.

== Gallery ==
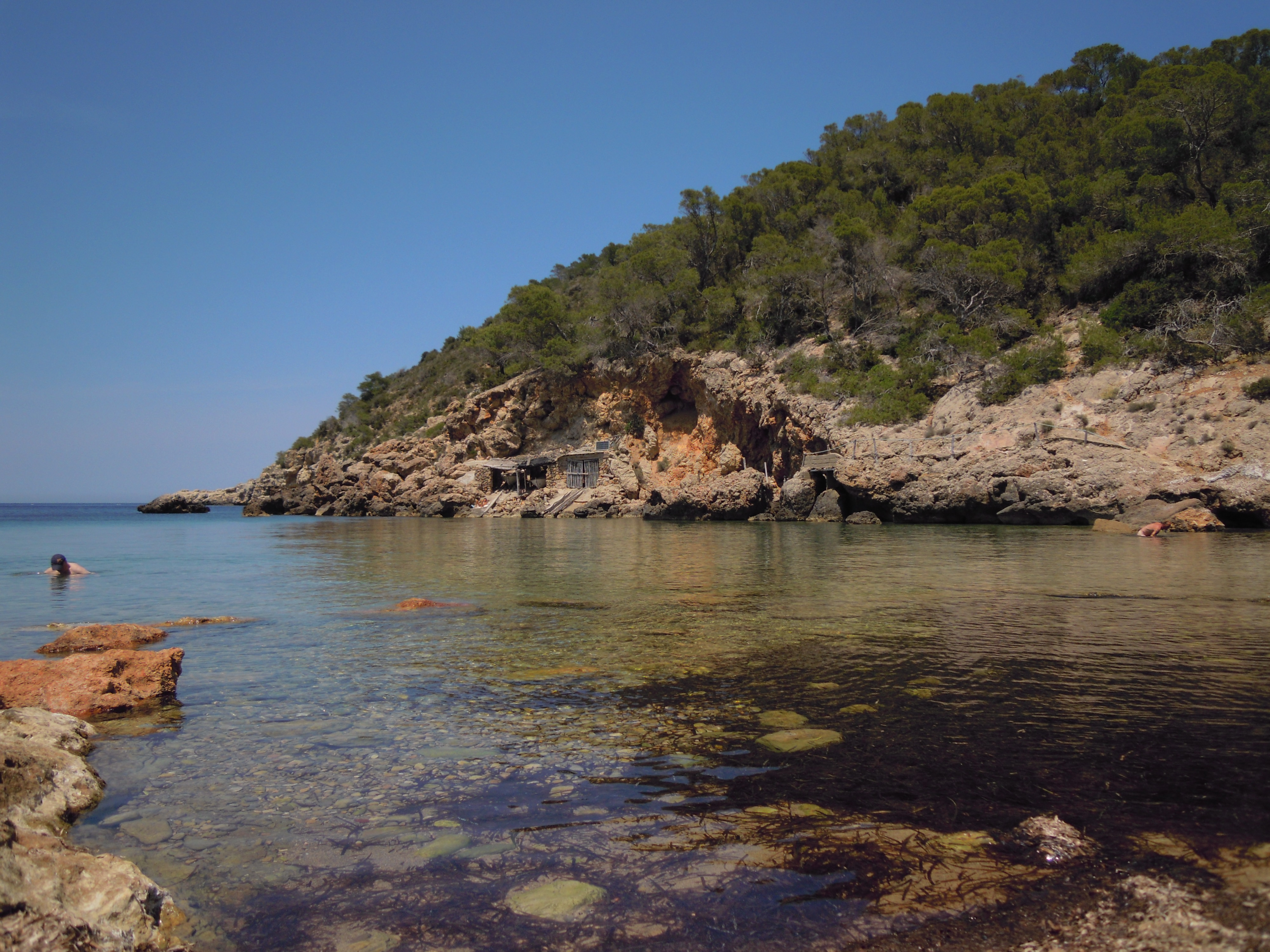
Cala Xucla
