= Sant Miquel =

Sant Miquel (Catalan for Saint Michael) may refer to:

== Buildings ==
- Sant Miquel, Benedictine monastery in Cruïlles, Monells i Sant Sadurní de l'Heura, Catalonia, Spain
- Sant Miquel del Fai, Benedictine monastery in Bigues i Riells, Catalonia, Spain

== Places ==
- Port de Sant Miguel, small beach resort on the north west coast of Ibiza
- Sant Miquel de Balansat, village in the Spanish island of Ibiza
- Sant Miquel de Campmajor, municipality in the comarca of Pla de l'Estany
- Sant Miquel de Fluvià, municipality in the comarca of Alt Empordà
- Sant Miquel de Solterra, highest mountain of the Guilleries Massif, Catalonia, Spain

== See also ==
- Miquel (disambiguation)
