= Leif Borthen =

Norwegian journalist and author

- Born: 25 January 1911; Trondheim, Norway
- Died: 9 June 1979 (aged 68); Ibiza, Spain
- Occupations: novelist, press attaché
- Writing career
- Pen name: Don Segundo
- Genres: Author, journalist,
- Notable works: Travel to Peron's Empire (1952); Tomorrow we leave for Bahia (1959); A soup in the Sun (1961); The Road to San Vincente (1967).

Leif Borthen (25 January 1911, in Trondheim – 9 June 1979, in Ibiza) was a Norwegian journalist and author.

== Early life ==
Borthen was a student of art history at the Royal Frederick University. In 1932 he gave up these studies and head for Spain for a year. This was in the time of the Second Spanish Republic, and he spent this time in the Catalan region. He spent part of the year working as a fisherman in Mallorca, where he lived in a colony of artists which included Jacob Brinchmann and Paul René Gauguin, the grandson of the French artist Paul Gauguin. In 1933 he moved to Ibiza and settled in the remote village of Sant Vicent de sa Cala in the north east of Ibiza. During this time he began writing for the Norwegian newspaper Dagbladet.

== 1940 to 1950s ==
At the outbreak of the Second World War, Borthen went to London, England, later to Argentina, where he worked in the Norwegian embassy in Buenos Aires as press attaché from 1945 until 1950. He wrote his first book in 1952 about his experiences there. It was called Reise til Peróns rike ("Travel to Peron's Empire") which was published in 1952. In 1955 Borthen along with Jan Wihbourg took a year out to travel the Brazilian rainforest. During this time he made a film and also wrote I morgen drar vi til Bahia ("Tomorrow we're off to Bahia")

== 1952 to 1960 ==
Between 1950 and 1952 Borthen reported for the newspaper Arbeiderbladet. He also made appearances on the Norwegian Broadcasting Corporation (NRK), and contributed to the leading Norwegian daily newspaper Verdens Gang, under the pseudonym Don Segundo, with articles on the cinema, cookery and current affairs. He also became a film and theatre critic, chairing the Norwegian Film Critics between 1959 and 1960.

In 1960 Borthen returned to Sant Vicent de sa Cala. He purchased a house and Borthen continued to write from there. In 1967 he published Veien til San Vicente ("The Road to San Vicente"). Borthen continued to work and live on Ibiza until his death in 1979.
