= The Road to San Vicente =

1967 novel by Leif Borthen

- English Translation edition
- Author: Leif Borthen
- Language: Norwegian
- Genre: Historical novel
- Publisher: Barbary Press
- Publication date: 1967
- Publication place: Norway
- English publication date: 2007
- Media type: Print paperback)
- Pages: 201 (first edition)
- ISBN: 978-84-611-8119-3

The Road to San Vicente is a book by Leif Borthen about life in the tiny village of Sant Vicent de sa Cala in the far north east of the Spanish island of Ibiza. In 1933 Borthen had arrived in Ibiza and settled in the remote village, along with René Paul Gauguin, the grandson of the French artist Paul Gauguin.

== Synopsis ==
The book is set in the remote valley in which Sant Vicent is situated. The story begins with Borthen's arrival in 1933 and also on his return to the village in 1960, just before a road was completed into the valley. It chronicles the life of the local people and of the foreigners who live amongst them. Characters include a notorious assassin, a roguish art dealer and an eccentric aristocrat. The story leads the reader into a world of rich island traditions with house blessings, blood feuds and a fast-vanishing rural way of life that would disappear for good following the road construction in 1963.

== Translation ==
The book has been translated into English by the author Martin Davies and Björn Lindholm but doesn't include the first three original chapters, but starts at the end of the fourth chapter. The text includes a number of footnotes which help the reader with Scandinavian references and rounds out and updates historical material mentioned in the text.

== Additional Texts ==
The last part of the book includes six additional text which are written by other authors who have recollections, researched or lived in the valley of Sant Vicent de sa Cala.

== Contents ==
- Preface: The Pityusan Tibet By Martin Davies
- A Note on the Text

=== The Book ===
- Chapter 1 Ibiza Revisited
- Chapter 2 Flotsam and Jetsam
- Chapter 3 Return to San Vicente
- Chapter 4 Antique Hunter
- Chapter 5 Priests and Postmen
- Chapter 7 A Ghost from the Past
- Chapter 8 Villain

=== The Additional Texts ===
- An Excursion to San Vicente By Walter Benjamin
- The Passing of San Vicente By Norman Lewis
- San Vicente By Enrique Fanjarnés Cardona
- The tax Collector’s Bread Oven By Jacques Massacrier
- A Brief History of Sant Vicent By Emily Kaufman
- Epilogue By Paul Richardson
- Glossary
- Contributors
- Sources and Acknowledgements
- Barbary Press
- Index
