= Vicent Tur =

Spanish school teacher and PSIB politician (1959–2021)

Vicent Tur Torres (1959 ― 17 January 2021), was a Spanish school teacher and PSIB politician from Eivissa island. He was councilor of the opposition of the Insular Council of Ibiza and Formentera between 1984 and 1987, and its vice president between 1999 and 2003, under the presidency of Pilar Costa. He was also mayor of Sant Joan de Labritja between 1987 and 1989. Between 1984 and 1987, and again between 1991 and 2007 he was member of the Parliament of the Balearic Islands. He was a politician very dedicated to the agrarian causes, becoming Insular Director of Agriculture.

He died on 17 January 2021 from cancer, after being admitted to the ICU at the Son Espases hospital in Palma de Mallorca.
