= Portinatx =

Urbanization and former fishing village on Ibiza

Coordinates: 39°06′44″N 1°31′04″E

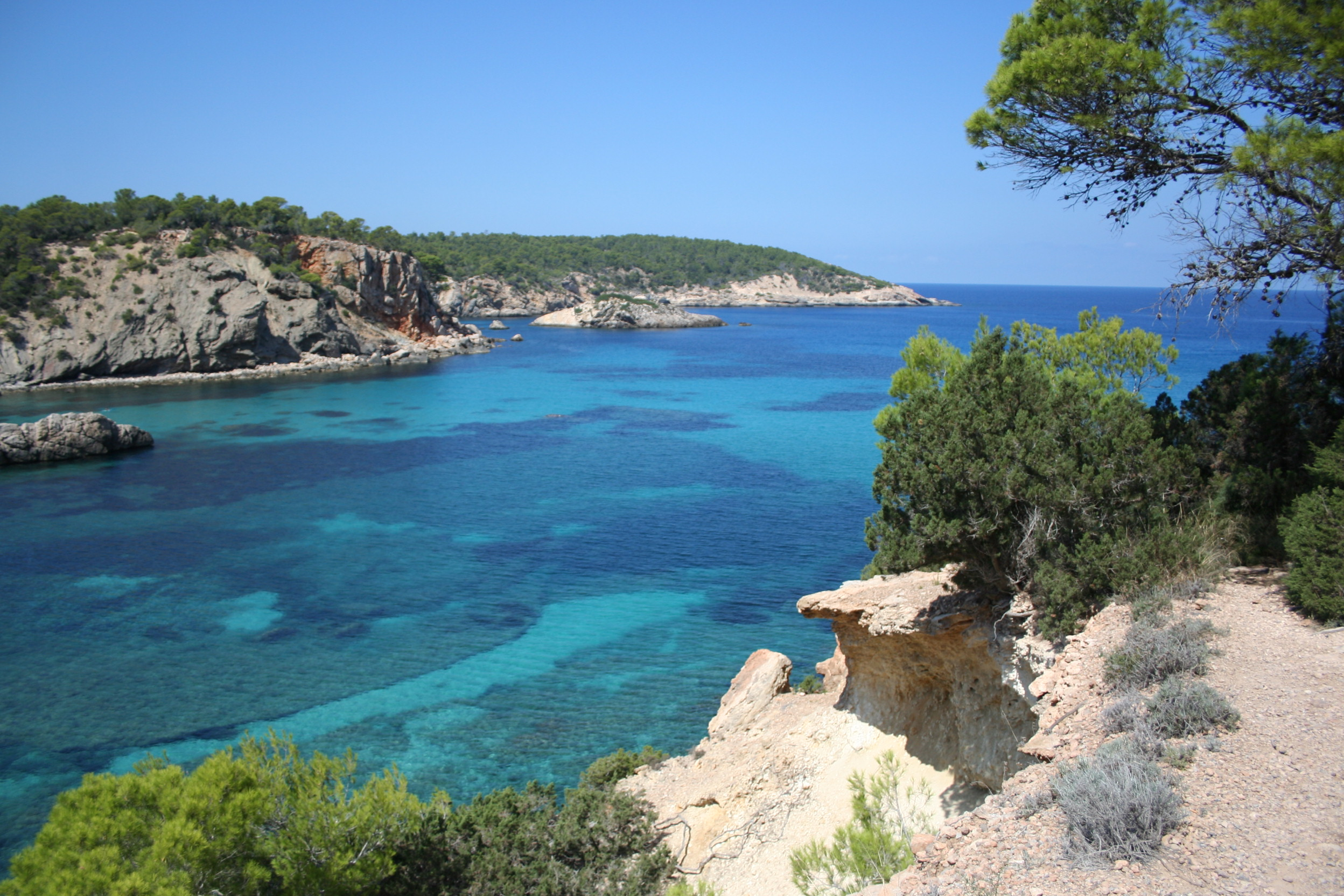
Cala de Portinatx

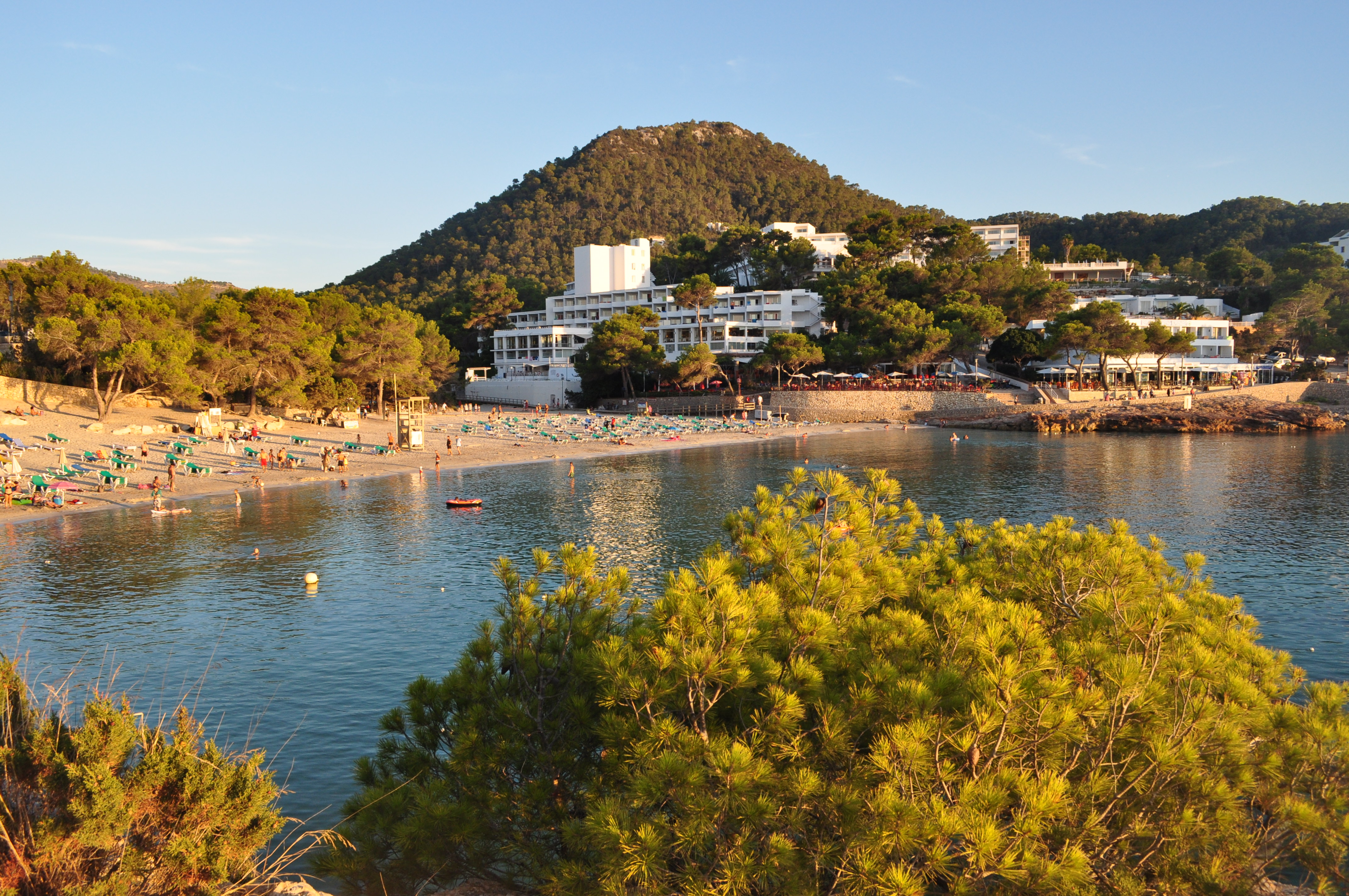
s'Arenal Gros Bay, Portinatx

Portinatx (Catalan pronunciation: [puɾtiˈnatʃ]) is a small urbanization, formerly a very small fishing village, on the island of Ibiza. It is located 1 hour from the island airport in the municipality of Sant Joan de Labritja and is the most northern bay on the island.

Portinatx is a remote part of Ibiza, making it difficult to get to other parts of the island. There is a scarce bus service to Ibiza Town (bus number 20), however it only runs every few hours in summer and twice a day in the winter season. There is also an infrequent boat service to Es Canar and Port de Sant Miguel. The town has a tobacco's shop, many restaurants and supermarkets.

Landmarks include the Punta Moscarter Lighthouse that is 1 hour walking from Portinatx center and 20/30 minutes by car. Like most of Ibiza, the surrounding countryside is heavily forested, as opposed to the more bare neighboring islands of Mallorca and Menorca. The town is shadowed over by sa Descoberta, a large wooded hill rising up to roughly 250 metres above sea level.

Portinatx is family oriented rather than a party place, with warm seas off of its small beaches that remain shallow for some distance, and with a few shops, rare bars and small number of places to eat of various national cuisines and price brackets. It has three cash points.

It is claimed by the Ibithencans (natives of Ibiza) that Portia was used in several outdoor scenes during the filming of South Pacific.
