= Miquel =

Miquel may refer to:

- the Catalan form of the given name Michael
- Amandine Miquel (born 1984), French football manager
- Beate von Miquel (born 1968), German academic and women's rights advocate
- Friedrich Anton Wilhelm Miquel (1811–1871), a Dutch botanist
- Gérard Miquel (born 1946), a member of the Senate of France
- Ignasi Miquel (born 1992), a Spanish football player
- Joaquín Miquel (1903–1929), Spanish Olympic runner
- Johann von Miquel (1828–1901), a German statesman
- Miquel's theorem, a result in geometry, named after Auguste Miquel
- Miquel Brown (born 1945), a Canadian actress and disco/soul singer

== See also ==
- Sant Miquel (disambiguation)
