= Sant Llorenç de Balafia =

Sant Llorenç de Balàfia San Lorenzo (Spanish)
- Village
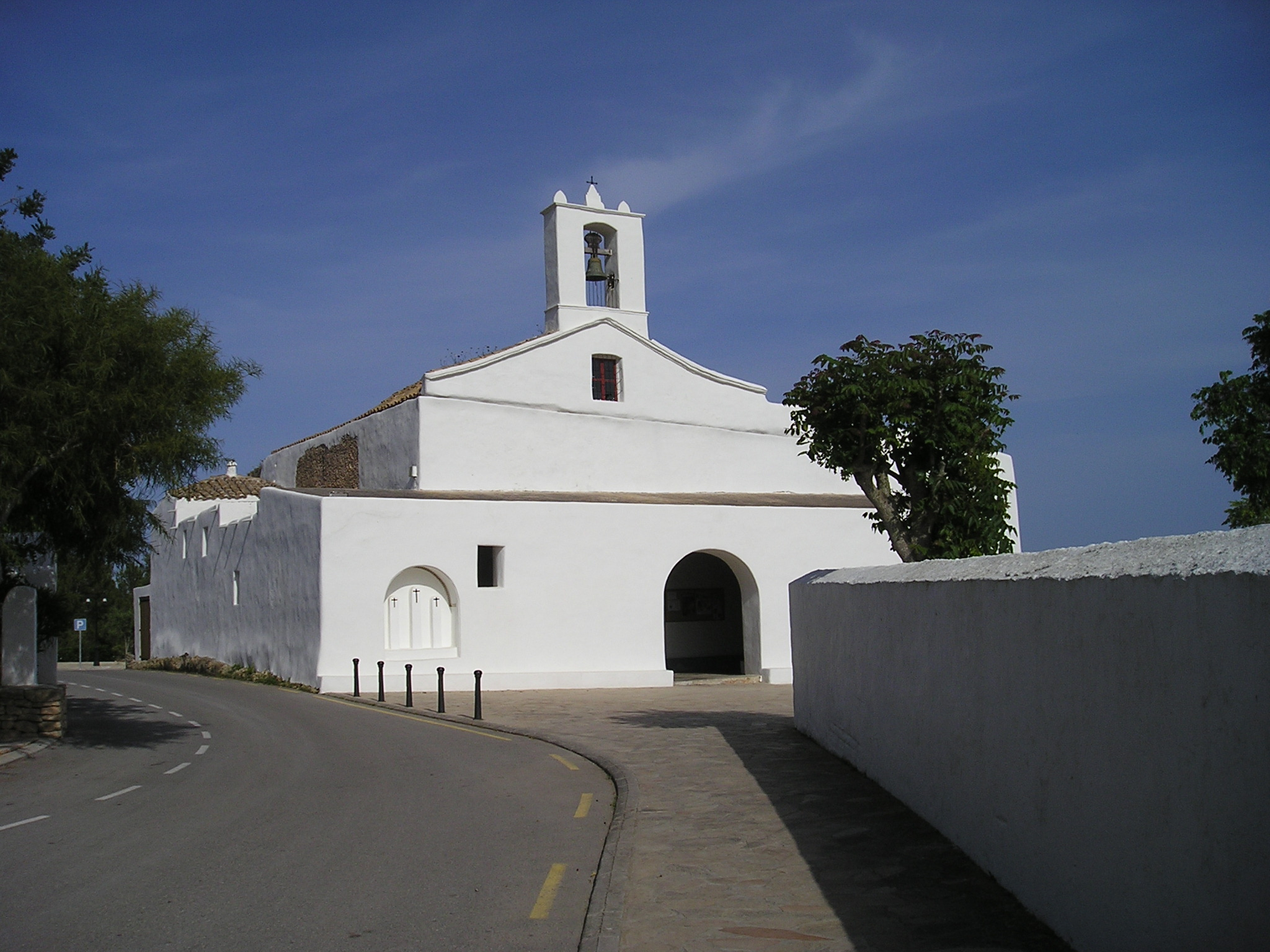
- The Church at Sant Llorenç de Balafia

- Location of the village in Ibiza
- Coordinates: 39°1′53″N 1°28′37″E
- Country: Spain
- Region: Balearic Islands
- Time zone: UTC+1 (CET)
  - Summer (DST): UTC+2 (CEST)

Sant Llorenç de Balàfia is a small village in the north central area of the Spanish island of Ibiza. The village is in the municipality of Sant Joan de Labritja. The village lies to the west the designated road EI-300 which connects Ibiza town with the village of Sant Joan de Labritja. The village is 9.9 miles (15.9 km) north of Ibiza Town and 14.5 miles (23.3 km) from Ibiza Airport.

== Description ==
The ancient village of Sant Llorenç de Balàfia, is often just known by the name Balàfia. This name derives from a time past when this was a Moorish village. The oldest part of the village consists of a grouping of seven houses which includes two refuge towers and two trulls (Olive Oil Press). From the main road (EI-300) a narrow lane branches away and passes close to an old well before winding its way through the aforementioned group of houses. The original builders believed in strength through numbers as shown by the way this settlement was built, with the dwellings close to each other. The seven house are strung out along a gently sloping ridge running north to south.
