= Punta Moscarter Lighthouse =

Lighthouse on Ibiza, Spain

Punta Moscarter Lighthouse Moscarté
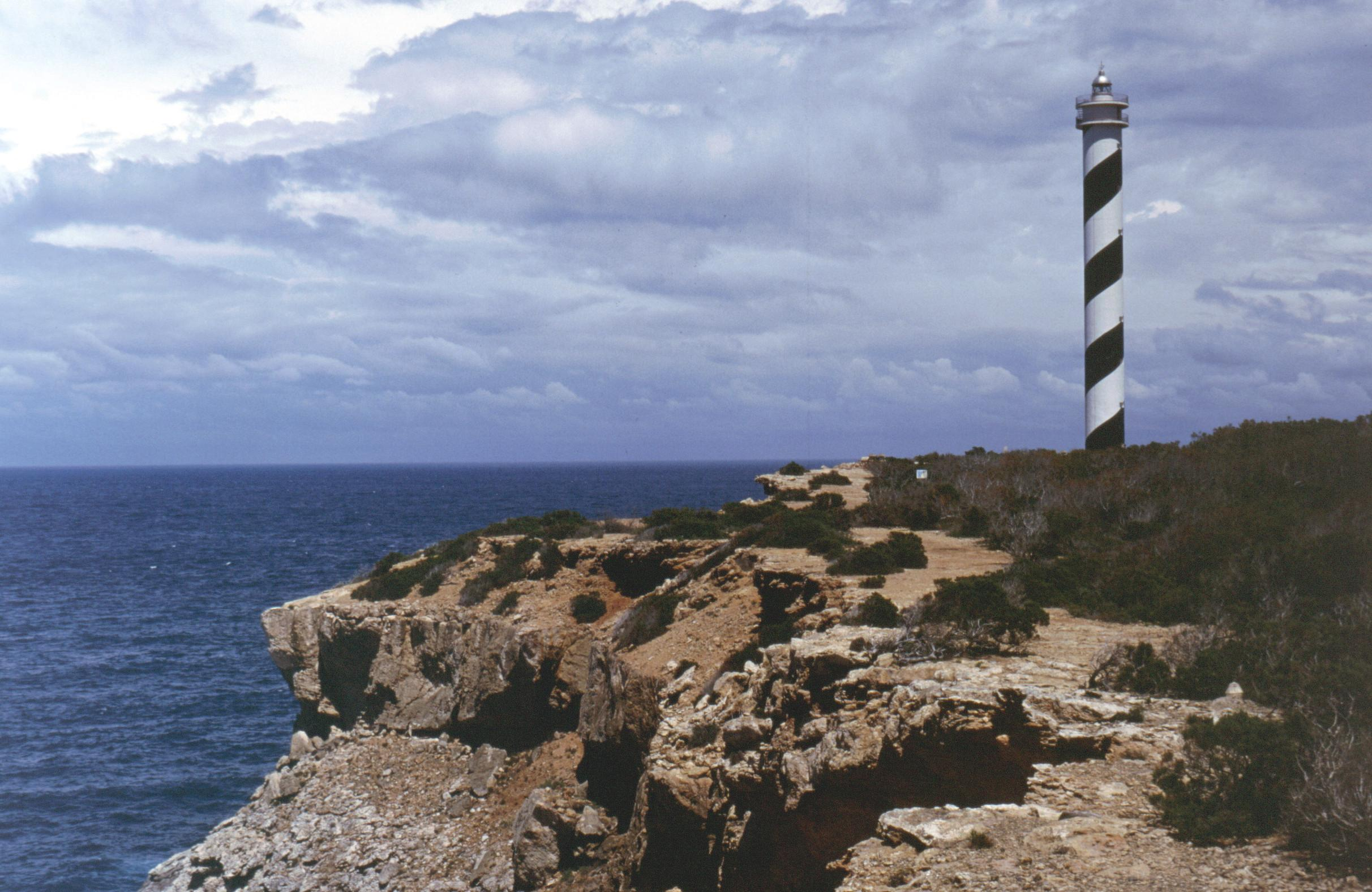
- Location: Portinatx; Ibiza; Spain
- Coordinates: 39.117698°N 1.533212°E

Tower
- Constructed: 1977
- Construction: concrete tower
- Height: 52 metres (171 ft)
- Shape: cylindrical tower with double balcony and lantern
- Markings: black and white spiral, grey lantern
- Power source: mains electricity
- Operator: Comisión de faros

Light
- First lit: 1978
- Focal height: 93 metres (305 ft)
- Range: 18 nautical miles (33 km; 21 mi)
- Characteristic: Fl W 5s.
- Spain no.: ES-31900

The Punta Moscarter Lighthouse is an active lighthouse, near Portinatx on the northern coast of the Spanish island of Ibiza.

Work began on the lighthouse in 1975 and it became operational in November 1978. The 52-metre-high (171 ft) concrete tower then became the tallest in the Balearic Islands, superseding the Illa de l'Aire Lighthouse on Menorca which has a masonry tower of 38 m.

== See also ==
- List of lighthouses in Spain
- List of lighthouses in the Balearic Islands
