= Cala de Sant Vicent =

Beach resort village on Ibiza, Spain

- Beach resort village
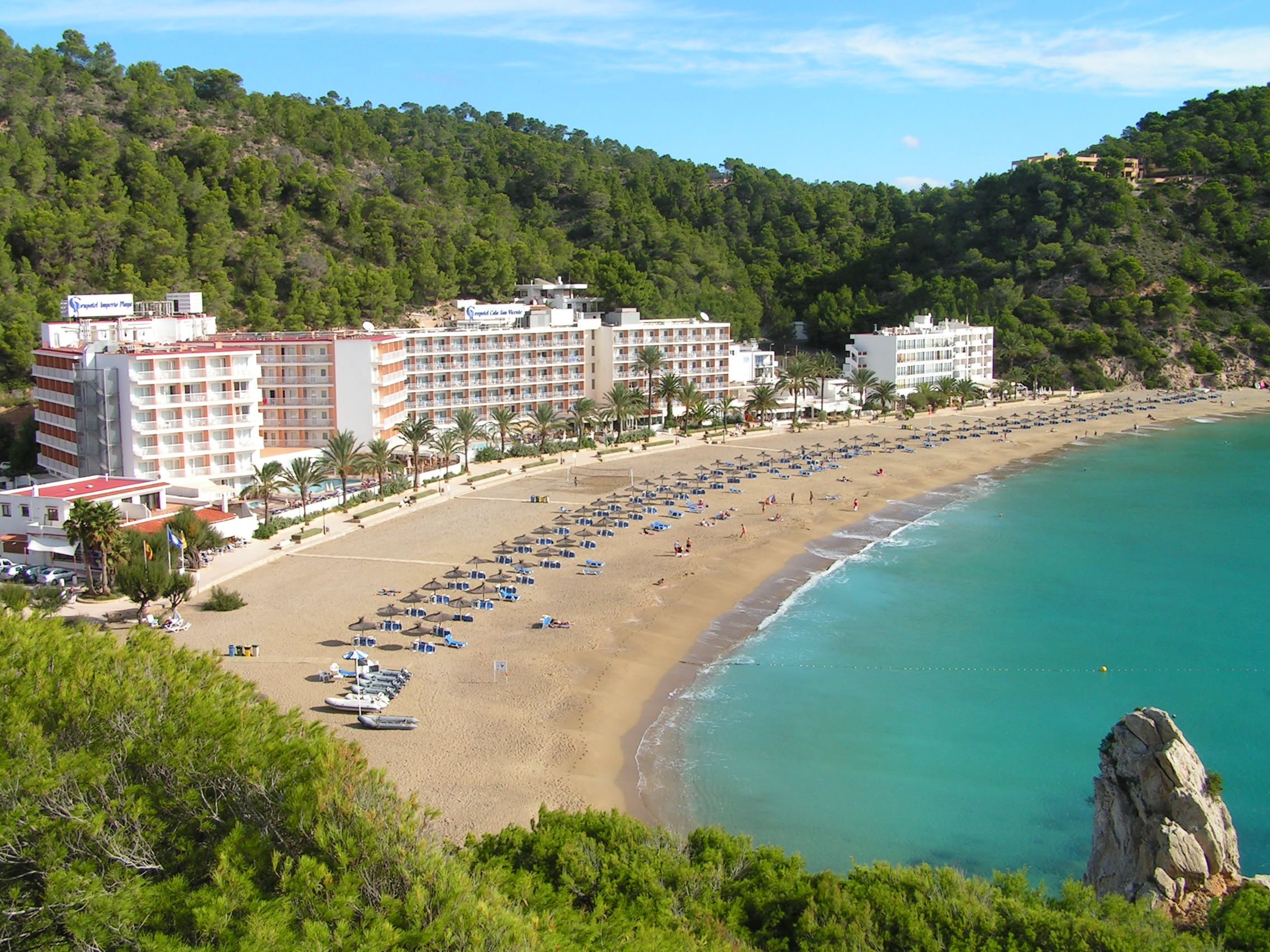
- The Bay of Cala de Sant Vicent

- Location of the resort in Ibiza
- Coordinates: 39°4′33″N 1°35′24″E
- Country: Spain
- Region: Balearic Islands
- Time zone: UTC+1 (CET)
  - Summer (DST): UTC+2 (CEST)

Cala de Sant Vicent is a beach resort village on the Spanish island of Ibiza. The resort is in the municipality of Sant Joan de Labritja. The resort is reached along the designated roads EI-321 east from Sant Joan de Labritja, and on the EI-200 north from Santa Eulària des Riu. The resort is 18.9 miles (30.4 km) north east of Ibiza Town and 23.5 miles (37.8 km) of Ibiza Airport. The resort is 3.0 kilometres (1.9 mi) along a valley, east of the small community of Sant Vicent de sa Cala.

This resort is in the isolated north-eastern tip of the island. It is a relatively quiet and child-friendly bay with a wide sandy beach. The bay is enclosed by steep cliffs to the south and the Sa Talaia which at its peak is 303 meters above sea level. The beach has clear, clean shallow waters.

== History ==
=== Cova des Culleram ===
In the hills above the resort there are a series of caves which encompass some of the islands oldest History. These caves can be found on the steep rocky slopes of the Cas Rierons uplands between Cala de Sant Vicent and the village of Sant Vicent de sa Cala. The small cave system was an important place and lay at the heart of Punic religious life more than two thousand years ago. The caves were first inhabited by Bronze Age settlers around 1600 BC and later was made into a shrine by Carthaginian colonist around 500 BC until 300 BC, The Carthaginian came here to worship their deities Reshef and Melkart, after which the caves became a shrine to the goddess Tanit. The caves were rediscovered in 1907 when a series of excavations took place, the last being in 1981. These dig uncovered hundreds of votive offerings which had been placed in the dark recesses of the caves to honour the gods of the ancient world. Many of the objects recovered from the caves can be seen in the Archaeological Museum in Dalt Vila (High Town) in Ibiza Town. On one side of the entrance to the cave there can be seen a cistern which has been cut into the rock. The water gathered here would have been used by the priests. Pilgrims who had made the trek here would have been ceremonially cleansed before entering the shrine.

=== The Spanish Civil War ===
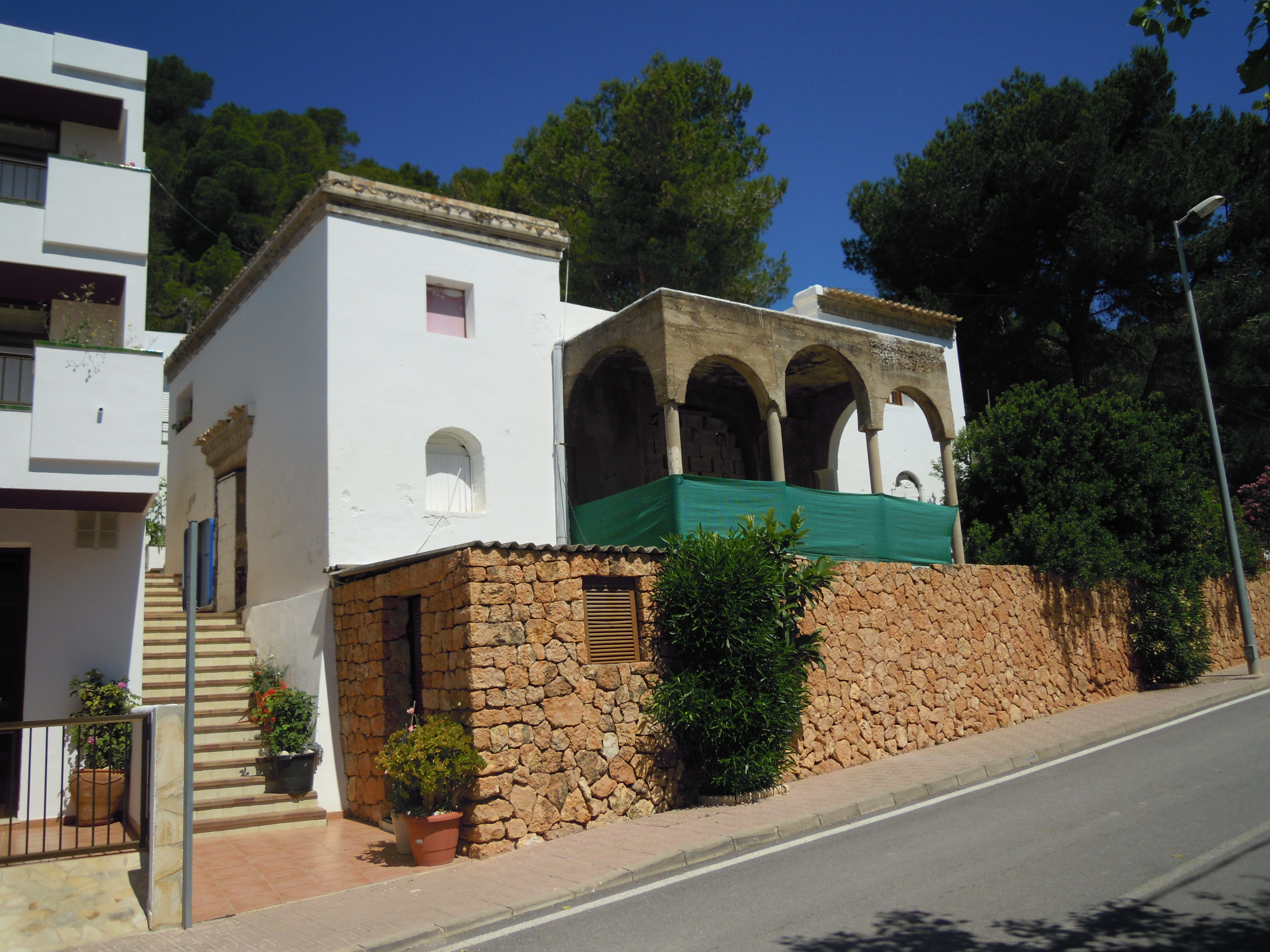
The house that Raoul Villain had built in the village

The bay of Cala de San Vicent has the unenviable claim to fame of being the scene of one of the first war crimes committed on the island of Ibiza. A Frenchman by the name of Raoul Villain had arrived in Ibiza to hide from his turbulent previous life in France. Villain had been a political assassin and had murdered the leader of the French Socialist Party, Jean Jaurès in a Paris café in 1914. Villain was brought to trial for the crime in 1919, and despite overwhelming evidence to the contrary, he was acquitted. In fear for his life following threats and intimidation from militant socialists, he fled France and arrived in Ibiza via Mexico. Villain thought that hiding in the remote north eastern corner of Ibiza he could live anonymously and be forgotten. In 1933 the Bay of Cala de San Vicent was a quiet backwater with no development, there was not even a road into the valley. Villain decided to make his home there. Using local labour and help from Paul René Gauguin the grandson of Paul Gauguin, he built a house from concrete and had almost finished the building by August 1936. On 13 September a small detachment of soldiers arrived on the beach of Cala de San Vicent by rowing boat. Eyewitness reported that they thought that they may have been Anarchists of the FAI. These soldiers were part of a larger detachment. The Force had arrived to re-secure the island following the mini-coup which had been orchestrated by the Nationalists under the command of Infantry Commander Juli Mestre. Villain had been away visiting a French woman in Santa Eulària des Riu but then quickly returned home when he heard of the soldiers' arrival. Feeling vulnerable, he feared that the soldiers would steal his valuables which he had hidden in the unfinished house. Despite being repeatedly warned by his neighbours not to go back to the cove, he still went home.

=== Execution ===
The Officer and troops who arrived on the beach that day seemed very suspicious of this Frenchman, who also antagonised the officer with his explanation of why he had set a crucifix on the hill behind his house. Apart from this outward show of religious zeal, the officer was also suspicious of were Villain had been that day, and decided to confine him to his house. He was considered to be a Fascist and a spy and as such a threat to their plans to reoccupy the island. The details of what happened next are sketchy, but what is certain, Villain end with a bullet wound which eventually killed him. It is true that, that afternoon three bombers from the Italian air force had flown along the coast over Cala de Sant Vicent and bombed Ibiza town which could be heard even this far up the coast. It is thought that the troops, on hearing the attack decided to return to the capital and tried to take Villain and his valuables with them. He reacted violently to this extradition, and as a consequence was shot in the back with the bullet exiting via his throat. Unfortunately for Villain he had only been wounded. The officer in charge warned the villages that had come down to see what had happened, not to assist or disturb the mortally wounded man. ‘‘Villain’’ lay alone on the sand for two days before he finally died. The locals then placed his body in a makeshift coffin, draped it in a French tricolour they found in his house, and buried him in the cemetery at nearby Sant Vicent de sa Cala.

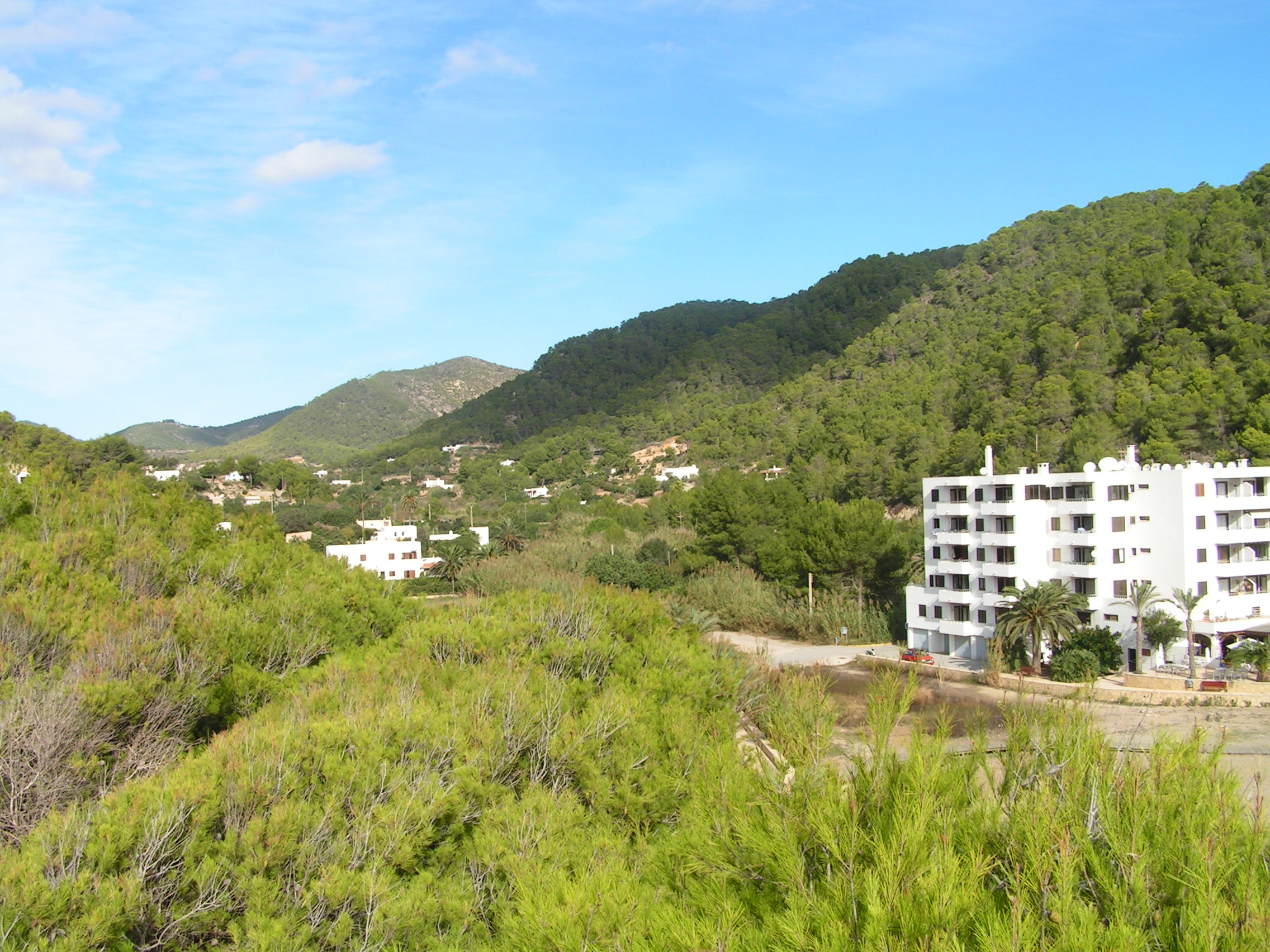
Looking North West up the valley from Cala de San Vicent towards San Vicent de Sa Cala
