= Sant Joan de Labritja =

Sant Joan de Labritja San Juan Bautista
- Village & Municipality
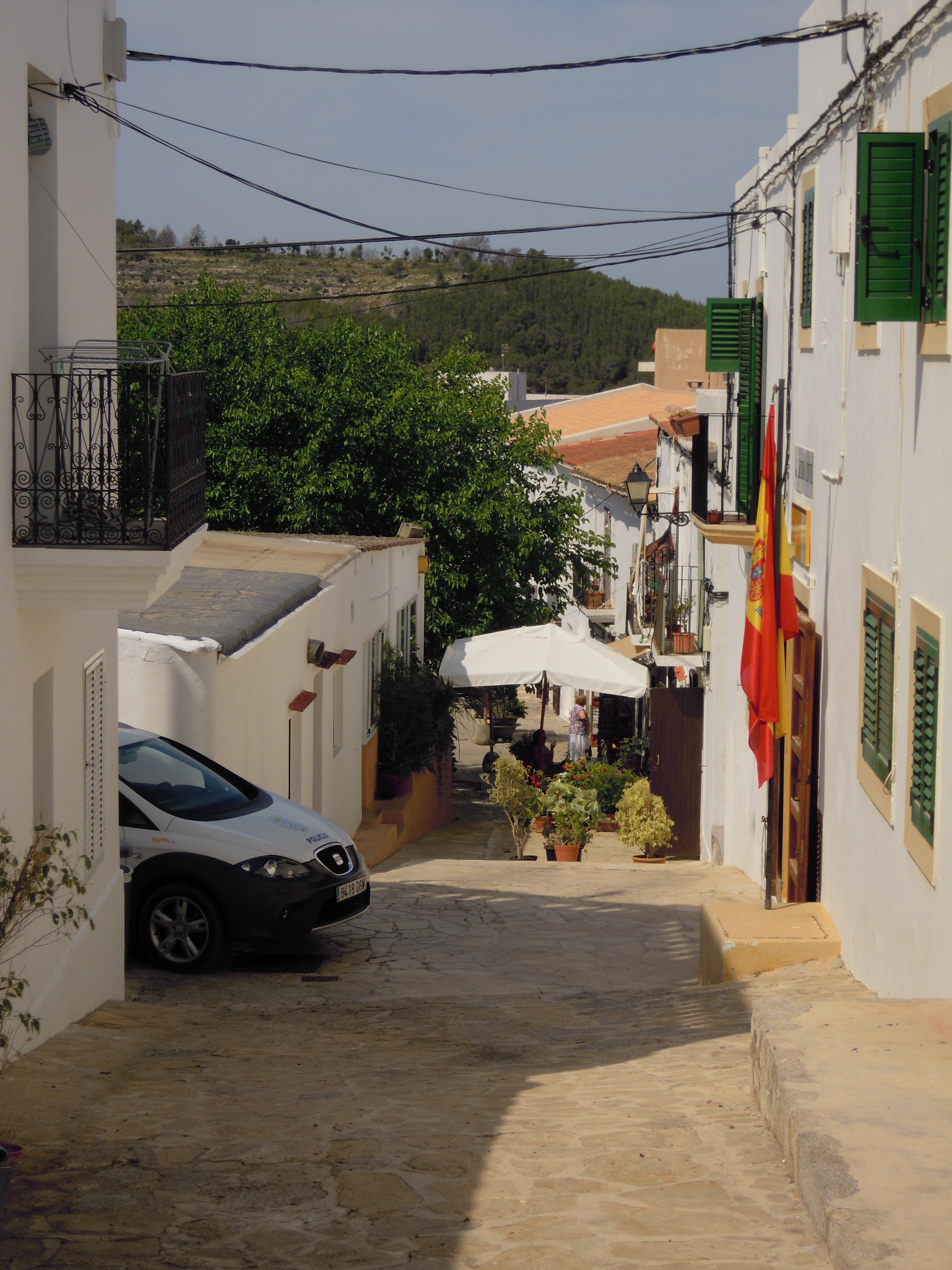
- The village of Sant Joan de Labritja

- Coat of arms

- Municipal location

- Location in Ibiza Sant Joan de Labritja (Balearic Islands) Sant Joan de Labritja (Spain)
- Coordinates: 39°4′40″N 1°30′48″E
- Country: Spain
- Region: Balearic Islands

Population (2025-01-01)
  - Total: 7,046
- Time zone: UTC+1 (CET)
  - Summer (DST): UTC+2 (CEST)

Sant Joan de Labritja (Balearic Catalan: [ˈsaɲ ʒuˈan də ləˈbɾidʒə], Spanish: San Juan Bautista) is a village and municipality of the Balearic Islands on northern Ibiza. Among others, the resorts of Portinatx and Cala de Sant Vicent are located there. The actual village of Sant Joan is a quiet street, dominated by an imposing Christian church, and is the meeting point of Sant Joan de Labritja Municipal Council. One may find several small cafés and restaurants, as well as a taxi rank, outside the Municipal Council building and the local office of the Guardia Civil, the Spanish Civil Guard. Towards the west of the village is the origin of the Torrent de Labritja, a tributary of the Riu de Santa Eulària, the Balearic Island's only constant-flowing river, although the Torrent only contains water during the winter months; throughout the tourist season, the stream is a dry river bed full of green vegetation.

== History ==
For many years, especially throughout much of the 20th century, the municipality was known by its Spanish name, San Juan Bautista. However, in 1981, following the establishment of the Autonomous Region of the Balearic Islands, where Catalan was the official language, all place names were reverted to their Catalan names, in this case it became Sant Joan de Labritja.

== Geography ==
The municipality is the least-populated municipality in Ibiza, and is almost entirely rural. The village of Portinatx on the northern coast is the only major tourist resort as well as the western port of Sant Miquel (San Miguel).

== Settlements ==
The municipality encompasses the following towns and villages:

Town/village	Population (2005)
Cala de Portinatx	458
Cala de Sant Vicent	117
Sant Miquel de Balansat	
Port de Sant Miquel	109
Sant Joan de Labritja	956
Sant Llorenç de Balàfia	1341
Sant Miquel de Balansat	1544
Sant Vicent de sa Cala	313

== See also ==
- The village of Sant Joan de Labritja
