= Sant Vicent de sa Cala =

- Hamlet
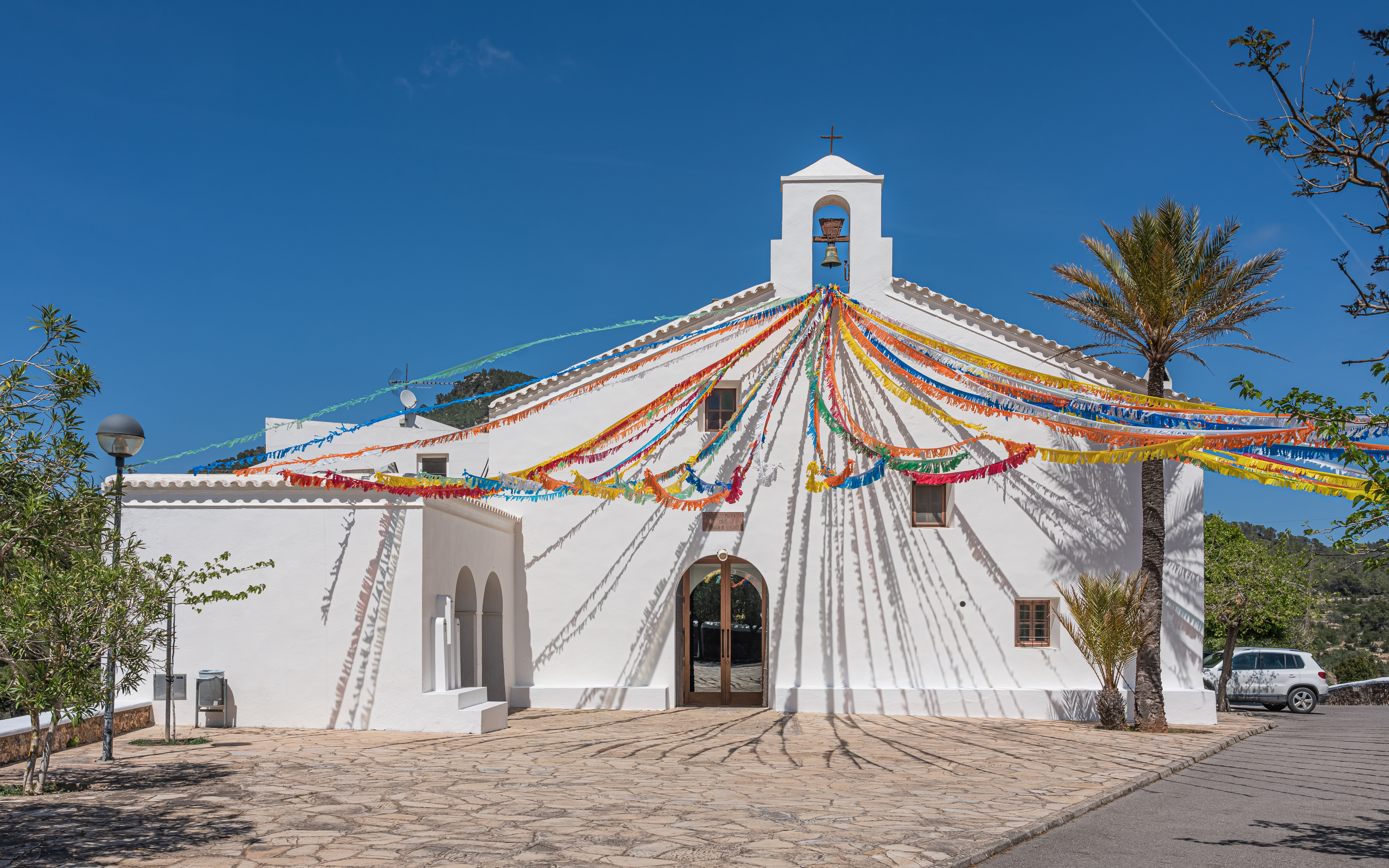
- The Church at Sant Vicent de sa Cala

- Location of the Hamlet in Ibiza
- Coordinates: 39°4′44.45″N 1°33′35″E
- Country: Spain
- Region: Balearic Islands
- Time zone: UTC+1 (CET)
  - Summer (DST): UTC+2 (CEST)

Sant Vicent de sa Cala is a hamlet in the northeast of the Spanish island of Ibiza. Sant Vicent de sa Cala is in the municipality of Sant Joan de Labritja and is a short distance west of the beach and holiday resort of Cala de Sant Vicent. The hamlet is on the north side of the designated road EI-321 which runs west to south between Sant Joan de Labritja and Cala de Sant Vicent. It is 18.8 miles (30.3 km) north east of Ibiza Town and 23.4 miles (37.7 km) from Ibiza Airport.

== Description ==
Sant Vicent de sa Cala is the smallest settlement on the island of Ibiza and is 3.0 kilometres (1.9 mi) west along a valley from the resort of Cala de Sant Vicent. The hamlet consists of several houses around a small rural church which is reached by taking a turn off the EI-321 northwards. The Església Sant Vicent was constructed between 1827 and 1838. The church has a double arched porch and sits in front of a tiny plaza contains a solitary palm tree. The façade is very plain except for a small plaque which states that the church is the "house of God and gate to heaven".
