= Sant Miquel de Balansat =

- Village
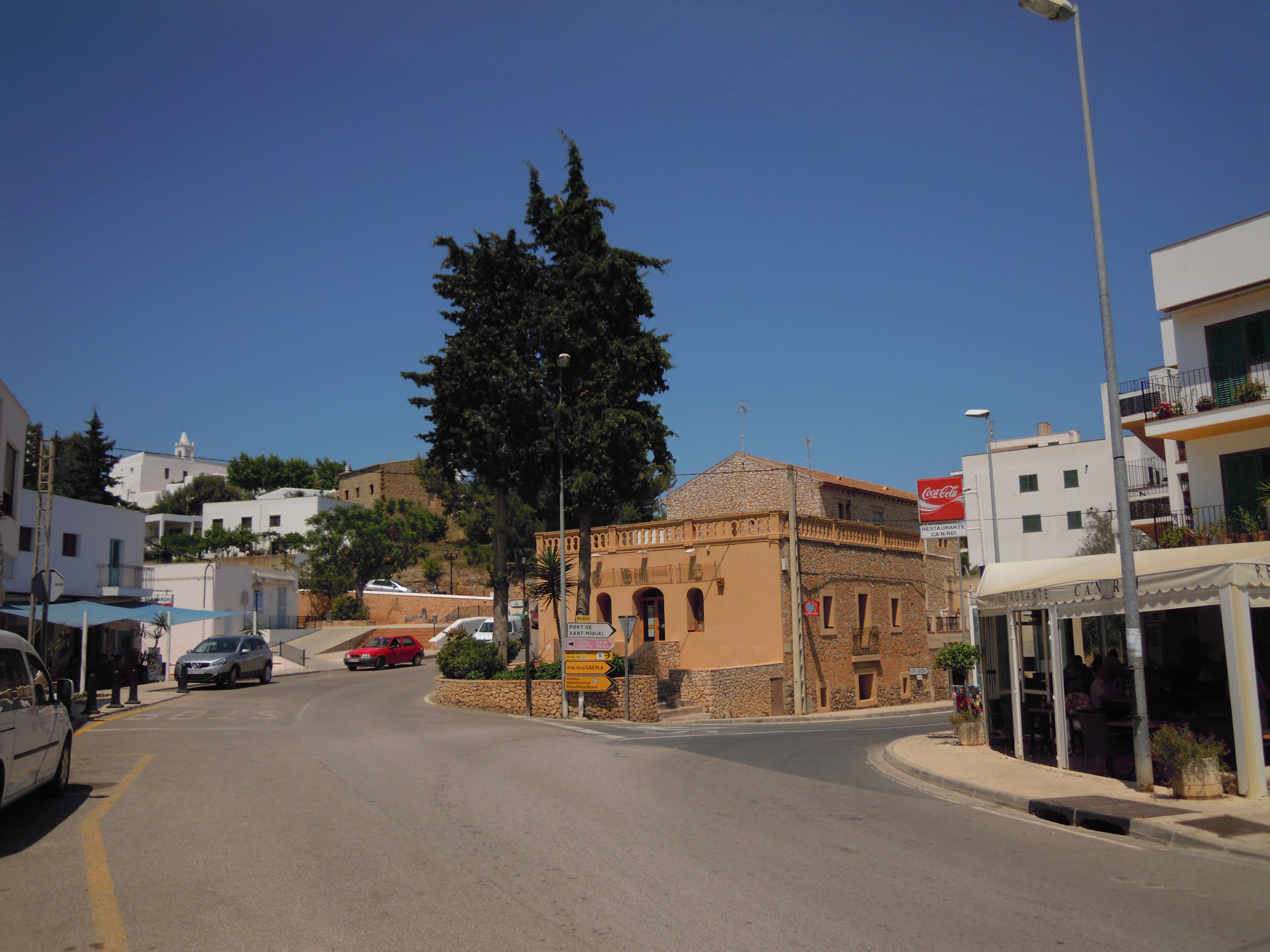
- Centre of Sant Miquel

- Location of the village in Ibiza
- Coordinates: 39°3′26″N 1°26′17″E
- Country: Spain
- Region: Balearic Islands

Population (2005)
  - Total: 1,544
- Time zone: UTC+1 (CET)
  - Summer (DST): UTC+2 (CEST)

Sant Miquel de Balansat is a village in the northeast of the Spanish island of Ibiza. The village is in the municipality of Sant Joan de Labritja and is located on the designated road EI-400. The village is 10.9 miles (17.5 km) north of Ibiza Town and 15.1 miles (24.3 km) from Ibiza Airport. 5.0 kilometres (3.1 mi) to the north of the village is the coastal resort of Port de Sant Miquel.

== Description ==
Sant Miquel is the largest urban centre in the municipality of Sant Joan de Labritja. The village still retains a few of the older houses which sit amongst much newer shops and apartments. On the north edge of the village is the hill top parish church. The church is dedicated to the Archangel Saint Michael.
