= Port de Sant Miguel =

Beach resort in Ibiza, Spain

- Beach
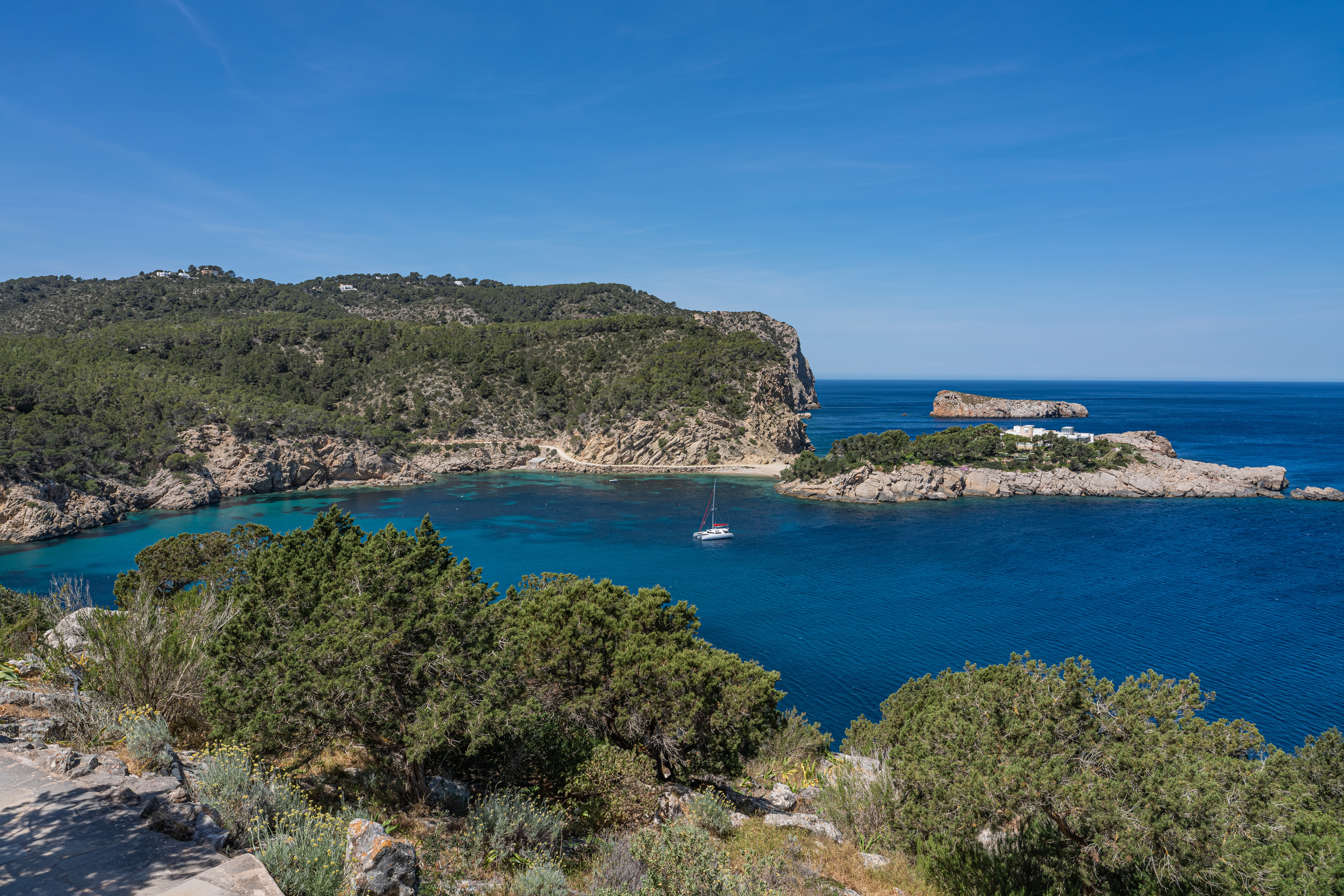
- Port de Sant Miguel

- Location within Ibiza
- Coordinates: 39°4′46″N 1°26′24″E
- Location: Sant Joan de Labritja, Ibiza, Spain

Port de Sant Miguel is a small beach resort with a white, sandy beach on the north west coast of Ibiza. This small settlement was once the fisherman's port for the nearby village of Sant Miquel de Balansat. The resort is situated in a small, sheltered inlet surrounded by steep cliffs which are topped with pine woodland and scrub. At the head of the cove is a small sandy beach. Behind the beach there are a number of shops, bars and restaurants. Beyond the commercial area and set on the side of the inlet there are several large hotels and apartment developments as well as some private residential property.

== Environment ==
Steps leading up the cliffs from the beach offer good vantage points for photographers wanting shots of the bay. There are several large concrete hotels and apartment blocks including around the bay but a short walk to a cove called Cala d'es Multons shows how the area would have looked before these developments. The resort is home to the Cova de Ca'n Marçà, a natural cave system once home to pirate smugglers.

== Hotels and accommodation ==
Located on the eastern side of the narrow inlet of Puerto San Miguel, the Hotel San Miguel is part of the largest hotel in the area. The complex also includes the Hotel Galeon and the San Miguel Beach club. Built as part of the building boom of the late 1970s, this Hotel caters almost exclusively for package tour guests, many of whom are on all-inclusive holidays.
