= Coyote vs. Acme (soundtrack) =

2026 film soundtrack album

Coyote vs. Acme (Original Motion Picture Soundtrack)

Film score by Steven Price
- Released: August 21, 2026
- Recorded: 2023
- Studios: Abbey Road Studios, London
- Genre: Film score
- Length: 60:54
- Label: WaterTower Music
- Producer: Steven Price

Steven Price chronology
The Running Man (2025)	Coyote vs. Acme (2026)

Coyote vs. Acme (Original Motion Picture Soundtrack) is the film score to the 2026 legal comedy film Coyote vs. Acme directed by Dave Green. The film score is composed by Steven Price which was recorded at the Abbey Road Studios in 2023, even before the film's initial cancellation. Much of his work remained unchanged for its theatrical release. The soundtrack featuring Price's score was released on August 21, 2026, through WaterTower Music, with a vinyl edition being planned for early 2027 through iam8bit.

== Background and development ==
The original score for Coyote vs. Acme was composed by Steven Price. Price sought to combine the traditional orchestration of Looney Tunes cartoons, courtesy of composer Carl W. Stalling, with the emotional requirements of the film's courtroom drama. Price drew inspiration from Stalling's works by revisiting numerous classic animated shorts to study their use of orchestral arrangements, rapid musical transitions and synchronization with on-screen movements. He established several recurring musical themes early in the process, which were subsequently adapted to accommodate the film's contrasting comedic and dramatic sequences.

The score featured two principal musical identities: a theme associated with Wile E. Coyote and the Road Runner, and another representing the ACME Corporation, alongside additional motifs for characters including Kevin Avery and Bugs Bunny. The latter incorporated elements of Western music to reflect the desert setting and the corporation's increasingly sinister nature. Price also collaborated closely with Green throughout the composition process, exchanging musical demonstrations and experimenting with different thematic arrangements to establish the appropriate tone for individual scenes.

One of the score's distinctive elements was the use of a professional choir to perform the Road Runner's signature "Meep Meep" sound. Price conceived the idea as a representation of Coyote's growing obsession with his elusive nemesis, imagining the sound as a recurring, almost haunting presence in the character's mind. The concept was subsequently incorporated into an arrangement of Pyotr Ilyich Tchaikovsky's "1812 Overture", reflecting the tradition of incorporating classical compositions into the original Looney Tunes cartoons. The choir and orchestra were recorded at Abbey Road Studios' Studio One in London, while smaller instrumental recordings, including banjo parts, were completed at Price's own studio.

The recording sessions were conducted with the musicians watching the film footage on a large screen, allowing the performances to correspond closely with the animation and comedic timing. Price and Green also worked extensively with the film's editors, making minute adjustments to musical cues, sometimes by just a few frames, to ensure that the music complemented the visual gags and sound effects. The same thematic material was gradually developed into more emotionally expressive arrangements for the courtroom sequences, particularly those emphasising Coyote's resilience and determination. The score was recorded and mixed before the film's initial cancellation in 2023 and remained unchanged for its eventual theatrical release.

== Release ==
The soundtrack was released through WaterTower Music digitally on August 21, 2026, one week prior to the film's release. A physical vinyl release of the album is scheduled to be released on the first quarter of 2027 through iam8bit and WaterTower Music.

== Reception ==
Filmtracks wrote "Overall, this score is remarkably smart instrumentally, thematically, and technically. Its shift from typical cartoon conventions to thoughtful drama is extremely well handled, and the presence of the contemporary elements is withheld to a perfect degree, helping rather than harming in almost all circumstances [...] Price's strategy for this score is very admirable, and it is a pleasure to hear such a well-reasoned and balanced approach to a potential Acme landmine of a narrative mash-up." Amy Nicholson of Los Angeles Times wrote "composer Steven Price playfully asks his choir to sing the Roadrunner's signature sound atop his dramatic orchestral score, saving a few "beep beeps" to censor the DJ Shadow rap track that grooves as lawyers try to serve the bird a subpoena."

== Track listing ==
No.	Title	Length
1.	"I Know Too Much"	2:38
2.	"Acme"	1:13
3.	"Fastas Hellus vs. Hungrious Carnivorus"	3:15
4.	"Thwarted Plans"	2:44
5.	"The Sky Is Not the Limit"	3:13
6.	"We Wrote the Law"	0:55
7.	"We Will Be Polite"	2:42
8.	"You May Be Seated"	1:15
9.	"My Client Is Innocent"	2:52
10.	"What’s Up Doc?"	2:16
11.	"That Looks Unspeakably Dangerous"	3:32
12.	"It Is Really Super Easy to Lose"	2:22
13.	"We Were Having a Heart to Heart"	1:24
14.	"Roadrunner Stew"	1:10
15.	"I Tawt I Taw"	2:14
16.	"This Calls for a Flashback"	3:17
17.	"Bombs, Boulders and Pianos"	1:44
18.	"The Whole World Will Be Watching"	1:48
19.	"You Wanted a Drumstick"	2:36
20.	"Stop Stop Stop Stop Stop Stop Stop"	3:16
21.	"He Wakes Up with Purpose"	3:23
22.	"Business Is Complex"	1:42
23.	"A Little Pain for the Greater Good"	2:29
24.	"Are You Coming Back"	2:34
25.	"They Trust You"	1:58
26.	"The Sky's the Limit"	1:24
27.	"1812 Overture"	0:58
Total length:		60:54

== Personnel ==
Credits adapted from Film Music Reporter:

- Music composer and producer: Steven Price
- Music supervisors: Andrew Kahn, Marielle Jade TE
- Music editors: Connor Hughes, Bradley Farmer
- Music clearances: Emily Richardson, Jackie Joseph
- Studio: Abbey Road Studios, London
- Recording: John Barrett
- Mixing: Gareth Cousins
- Pro-tools operator: Neil Dawes
- Music preparation: Dave Hage
- Orchestrator: David Butterworth
- Conductor: Geoff Alexander
- Orchestra leader: John Mills
- Choir: The London Voices

== Release history ==
Region	Date	Format(s)	Label(s)	Ref.
Various	August 21, 2026	Digital download; streaming	WaterTower Music	
Various	Early 2027	LP	Iam8bit	

== Accolades ==
Award	Date of ceremony	Category	Nominee(s)	Result	Ref.
Hollywood Music in Media Awards	November 18, 2026	Best Original Score – Animated Film	Steven Price	Nominated	
