= Kevin Avery =

American biographer and short story writer

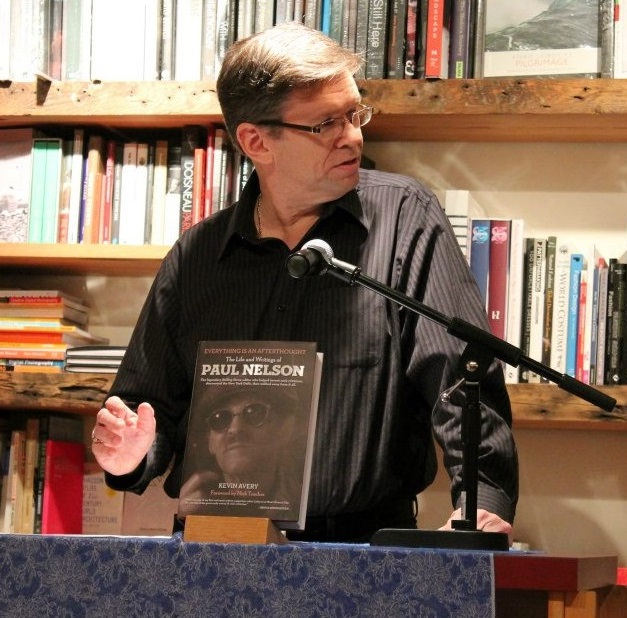
- Avery reading at Bookcourt in Brooklyn, New York, December, 2011
- Born: June 24, 1957 (age 69); Salt Lake City, Utah, U.S.
- Occupations: Biographer; short story writer; editor
- Writing career
- Period: 1986 - present
- Website: kevinavery.com

Kevin Avery (born June 24, 1957) is an American biographer, short story writer, and editor. His first two books, Everything Is an Afterthought: The Life and Writings of Paul Nelson and Conversations with Clint: Paul Nelson's Lost Interviews with Clint Eastwood, 1979–1983, were published within weeks of each other by two different publishers, Fantagraphics Books and Continuum Books, respectively, in 2011.

== Early life ==
Kevin Avery was born and raised in Salt Lake City, Utah.

== Career ==
Prior to publishing his first book, Avery was vice-president of Yield Management for Motor Cargo, a Western regional transportation company that was acquired by UPS Freight, the Less-Than-Truckload (LTL) trucking division of UPS.

Avery's first published works were short stories, which were published by periodicals including City Weekly, Gallery, Weber Studies, Utah Holiday, California Quarterly, and Mississippi Review.

In 1992, he began writing nonfiction, mainly rock & roll criticism, for CATALYST Magazine, The Event, Penthouse, and Salt Lake magazine. Interview subjects included NBA star Shaquille O'Neal, musical acts Radiohead, Freedy Johnston, Los Lobos, Tori Amos, Moody Blues, Graham Parker, and Sheryl Crow, cartoonist John Callahan, and late impresario Eugene Jelesnik. Avery's music criticism was greatly influenced by the work of Paul Nelson, whose work he'd begun reading as a teenager.

Beginning in 2006, upon learning of Nelson's death, Avery spent four years researching and writing Everything Is an Afterthought: The Life and Writings of Paul Nelson, an anthology-biography compiling some of Nelson's best works while also documenting the critic's tragic life. In addition to interviewing Nelson's friends, family, and fellow critics, Avery interviewed some of the artists about whom Nelson wrote, including Bruce Springsteen, Jackson Browne, Elliott Murphy, Bruce Hornsby, Suzanne Vega, and Rod Stewart.

From 2010 to 2011, Avery edited Conversations with Clint: Paul Nelson's Lost Interviews with Clint Eastwood, 1979–1983, compiled from interview tapes with Clint Eastwood found in Paul Nelson's apartment after his death. Critic Robert Christgau called the book, which was published eight weeks before Everything Is an Afterthought, "astonishingly thorough."

In October 2016, he published his third book (his second for Fantagraphics) It's All One Case: The Illustrated Ross Macdonald Archives, editing Paul Nelson's forty hours of interviews with detective writer Ross Macdonald.

He founded Mere Words Media Relations, a boutique public relations firm that provides a full array of affordable publicity services.

== Personal life ==
In 2005, Avery moved to New York City to pursue his writing career, and married there in 2006. He now lives in Brooklyn, New York, with his wife Deborah Avery.

== Bibliography ==
- Everything Is an Afterthought: The Life and Writings of Paul Nelson, Fantagraphics Books, 2011. ISBN 1606994751
- Conversations with Clint: Paul Nelson's Lost Interviews with Clint Eastwood, 1979–1983, Continuum Books, 2011. ISBN 144116586X

=== Short fiction ===
- "A Daughter Is a Different Matter", Weber Studies, Winter 1994
