= Change Will Come =

Studio album by Elliott Murphy
- Released: 1987
- Studio: Record Plant, New York City
- Genre: Rock
- Label: New Rose
- Producer: Jim Ball

Elliott Murphy chronology
Milwaukee (1985)	Change Will Come (1987)	Après le Déluge (1987)

Professional ratings
Review scores
Source	Rating
Allmusic	4/5 stars

Change Will Come was recorded at Record Plant Studio in NYC where Elliott Murphy had recorded his first album Aquashow. Murphy worked with producer James A. Ball and featured special guest vocalist Shawn Colvin and Jim Babjak of The Smithereens on 12 String Guitar.

== Track listing ==
All tracks composed by Elliott Murphy

1. "Change Will Come"
2. "Many Can Read (Few Can Reason)"
3. "Chain of Pain"
4. "The Eyes of the Children of Maria"
5. "Something Ain't Right"
6. "And That's Called Insanity"
7. "Theme Song"
8. "Acting So Friendly"
9. "Feel That Way"
10. "The Goodbye Song"
11. "Time Flies"

== Personnel ==
- Elliott Murphy - vocals, guitar, harmonica, keyboards
- Tommy Mandel - piano, keyboards
- Lewis King - drums
- Ernie Brooks - bass
- Shawn Colvin - vocals
- Jim Babjak - 12-string guitar
- Paul Prestopino - mandolin
