= Lost Generation (album) =

Studio album by Elliott Murphy
- Released: 1975
- Recorded: January 1975
- Studios: Elektra, Los Angeles, California
- Genre: Rock
- Label: RCA
- Producer: Paul A. Rothchild

Elliott Murphy chronology
Aquashow (1974)	Lost Generation (1975)	Night Lights (1976)

Professional ratings
Review scores
Source	Rating
Allmusic	4/5 stars
Christgau's Record Guide	B

Lost Generation was the second major label album by singer-songwriter Elliott Murphy produced by Paul A. Rothchild and recorded at Elektra Studio in Los Angeles and was reviewed by Paul Nelson in Rolling Stone. The album featured an all-star band of top session musicians including drummer Jim Gordon and keyboardist Richard Tee. The cover photo of Murphy standing in front of an open parachute was taken by photographer Ed Caraeff. Paul Nelson's Rolling Stone review called the album "brilliant but extraordinarily difficult" and gave Murphy the Hemingwayesque accolade, "When he's on the street, the sun also rises on one of the best."

== Track listing ==
All tracks composed by Elliott Murphy

1. "Hollywood"
2. "A Touch of Mercy"
3. "History"
4. "When You Ride"
5. "Bittersweet"
6. "Lost Generation"
7. "Eva Braun"
8. "Manhattan Rock"
9. "Visions of the Night"
10. "Lookin' Back"

== Personnel ==
- Elliott Murphy – vocals, guitar, harmonica, keyboards
- Richard Tee – piano
- Wayne DeVillier – keyboards
- Jim Gordon – drums, percussion
- Ned Doheny – guitar
- Sonny Landreth – guitar
- Jackie Clark – guitar
- Bobby Kimball – harmony vocals
- Gordon Edwards – bass
- Jon Smith – saxophone

Technical

- Fritz Richmond – engineer
- Acy Lehman – art direction
- Dennis Katz – cover design
- Ed Caraeff – photography
