= Ma Mère =

2004 film by Christophe Honoré

- Theatrical release poster
- Directed by: Christophe Honoré
- Screenplay by: Christophe Honoré
- Based on: Ma Mère by Georges Bataille
- Produced by: Paulo Branco; Bernard-Henri Lévy
- Starring: Isabelle Huppert; Louis Garrel; Emma de Caunes; Joana Preiss
- Cinematography: Hélène Louvart
- Edited by: Chantal Hymans
- Production companies: Gemini Films; Les Films du Lendemain; Arte France Cinéma; Natan Productions; Clap Films; S2 International; Audiovisual Consulting
- Distributed by: Gemini Films (France); Leopardo Filmes (Portugal); Poool Filmverleih (Austria)
- Release dates: 19 May 2004 (France); 1 July 2004 (Portugal); 20 July 2007 (Austria)
- Running time: 110 minutes
- Countries: France; Portugal; Spain; Austria
- Language: French
- Budget: €2.7 million
- Box office: $1.5 million

Ma Mère (English: My Mother) is a 2004 erotic drama film written and directed by Christophe Honoré, based on the posthumous 1966 novel of the same name by French author Georges Bataille. The film follows the incestuous relationship between a 17-year-old boy and his attractive, promiscuous, 43-year-old mother. The film stars Isabelle Huppert, Louis Garrel, Emma de Caunes and Joana Preiss.

An international co-production of France, Portugal, Spain and Austria, the film was shot on location on the island of Gran Canaria, Canary Islands, Spain. Its dialogue is almost entirely in French with brief segments in Spanish, German and English. The film was released in France on 19 May 2004 by Gemini Films, in Portugal on 1 July 2004 by Leopardo Filmes and in Austria on 20 July 2007 by Poool Filmverleih.

== Plot ==
Seventeen-year-old Pierre has recently left a Catholic boarding school to live with his wealthy parents at their villa on the island of Gran Canaria. Pierre's father dies, leaving his mother Hélène to care for him. While in a restaurant, his mother reveals to him that she had been unfaithful to her husband many times with his knowledge and feels no shame about it. She then insists that her son accept her promiscuous ways. Soon after this, Pierre finds a closet full of his father's pornography. His reaction is to furiously masturbate and then to urinate on the magazine pages.

Hélène encourages her uninhibited sex partner Réa to have sex with Pierre. She does so in public at Gran Canaria's Yumbo Centrum, a popular shopping and nightlife complex. Hélène looks on longingly as the partially clothed couple copulates with passersby raising no objections.

Afterwards, Hélène includes her son in an orgy with her friends, including Hansi. After the orgy, Hélène decides that she must leave her son to travel. While saying goodbye to Pierre, she implies that something taboo has happened between them and that she must leave to prevent it from happening again.

Upon Hélène's departure, Hansi enters Pierre's life as a friend. She admits befriending Pierre at Hélène's encouragement but denies receiving a fee from her. Their friendship blossoms into a tender romance and they both fall in love. During their relationship, Hansi reveals that she has participated in sado-masochistic sex many times as a dominatrix with her friend Loulou as the willing masochist. She adds Hélène arranged these encounters as sexual exhibitions for tourists.

Hélène returns home with Réa. Upon arriving, she finds her son and Hansi socializing at a bar near the villa. Hélène and Pierre greet each other and chat while gazing into each other's eyes, with Hansi looking on jealously. Hélène invites her son to sleep with her. He agrees.

Hélène and Pierre enter the house's wine cellar. Hélène asks her son to cut her abdomen with a razor while he masturbates, and as he climaxes, she slits her own throat. Paramedics take away her body. Pierre says goodbye to his mother before the cremation. He enters the room where she lies in state and masturbates, exclaiming that he does not want to die as she is carried out.

== Cast ==
- Isabelle Huppert as Hélène
- Louis Garrel as Pierre
- Emma de Caunes as Hansi
- Joana Preiss as Réa
- Jean-Baptiste Montagut as Loulou
- Dominique Reymond as Marthe
- Olivier Rabourdin as Robert
- Philippe Duclos as Father

== Release ==
=== Theatrical ===
Ma Mère was released in France on 19 May 2004 by Gemini Films, in Portugal on 1 July 2004 by Leopardo Filmes and in Austria on 20 July 2007 by Poool Filmverleih. The film was rated NC-17 upon its release in the United States on 13 May 2005, due to "strong and aberrant sexual content". For the trailer, the film was presented as an NC-17 film while mistakenly defining the rating as "under 17 requires supervision by parent or guardian" (which is the definition of the R rating).

=== Home media ===
An edited R-rated version running ten minutes shorter was released on DVD. The reason for the R-rated version was "Strong Aberrant Sexuality, Some Language and Violent Images".

== Reception ==
On the review aggregator website Rotten Tomatoes, the film holds an approval rating of 16% based on 44 reviews, with an average rating of 3.9/10. The website's critics consensus reads, "Pretentious, overly perverse and dull." Metacritic, which uses a weighted average, assigned the film a score of 35 out of 100, based on 19 critics, indicating "generally unfavorable reviews".

Scott Foundas of Variety called the film "respectable, tightly coiled, but ultimately unrewarding". Stephen Holden of The New York Times wrote, "Ma Mère may be ludicrous, but its cast displays a commitment that deserves more than grudging admiration."

Jonathan Romney likened the film to New French Extremity.

== See also ==
- Isabelle Huppert on screen and stage
- List of NC-17 rated films
- List of French films of 2004
