= Aquashow Deconstructed =

Studio album by Elliott Murphy
- Released: 2015
- Genre: Rock
- Label: Last Call
- Producer: Gaspard Murphy

Elliott Murphy chronology
Aquashow Deconstructed (2015)	Prodigal Son (2017)

Professional ratings
Review scores
Source	Rating
PopMatters	8/10 stars

Aquashow Deconstructed was the re-recording by singer-songwriter Elliott Murphy of the ten songs off his 1973 album Aquashow in a Paris studio, produced, arranged and mixed by his son Gaspard Murphy who had previously produced French pop band Superbus.

== Track listing ==
All tracks composed by Elliott Murphy

1. "Last of The Rock Stars"
2. "How's The Family"
3. "Hangin' Out"
4. "Hometown"
5. "Graveyard Scrapbook"
6. "Poise 'N Pen"
7. "Marilyn"
8. "White Middle Class Blues"
9. "Like a Great Gatsby"
10. "Don't Go Away"

== Personnel ==
- Elliott Murphy – vocals, guitar, harmonica, keyboards
- Tom Daveau – drums
- Olivier Durand – guitar
- Gaspard Murphy – guitar, bass, keyboards, background vocals
- Thomas Roussel – violin
- David Gaugué – Cello
