= Just a Story from America =

Just a Story From America

Studio album by Elliott Murphy
- Released: 1977
- Recorded: 1976
- Studio: Air Studios, London; Marquee Studios, London; Audio International Studios, London
- Genre: Rock
- Label: Columbia
- Producer: Robin Geoffrey Cable

Elliott Murphy chronology
Night Lights (1976)	Just a Story From America (1977)	Affairs (1980)

Professional ratings
Review scores
Source	Rating
AllMusic	3.5/5 stars
Christgau's Record Guide	C−

Just a Story from America was the fourth major label album by singer-songwriter Elliott Murphy and was reviewed by Paul Nelson in Rolling Stone. The album was recorded at Air Studios in London in 1976 and featured guest artists former Rolling Stones guitarist Mick Taylor and future Genesis front man Phil Collins on drums. "Anastasia" was a minor hit in France and "Drive All Night" was a hit for the Japanese band The Roosters in 1980.

== Track listing ==
All tracks composed by Elliott Murphy

1. "Drive All Night"
2. "Summer House"
3. "Just a Story from America"
4. "Rock Ballad"
5. "Think Too Hard"
6. "Anastasia"
7. "Darlin'"
8. "Let Go"
9. "Caught Short in the Long Run"

== Personnel ==
- Elliott Murphy – vocals, guitar, harmonica, organ, marimba, tambourine
- Phil Collins – drums, backing vocals
- Mick Taylor – guitar on "Rock Ballad"
- Dave Markee – bass
- Peter Oxendale – piano, organ
- Morris Pert – percussion
- Chris Mercer, Steve Gregory – saxophone on "Drive All Night"
- Barry De Souza – drums on "Caught Short in the Long Run"
- Mike Moran – keyboards on "Caught Short in the Long Run"

Technical

- Colin Fairley, Greg Walsh, Steve Holroyd – recording
- Paula Scher
- David Bailey – photography
