= Curt Weiss =

American drummer

Curt Weiss (born 10 December 1959 in Brooklyn, New York), is an American writer, television producer, and, under the name Lewis King, musician. His writing has appeared in Classic Drummer magazine, and as author of the 2017 book Stranded in the Jungle: Jerry Nolan’s Wild Ride. As a musician he has drummed with the Rockats and Beat Rodeo and with members of Holly and the Italians and the Modern Lovers.

== Early life and education ==
Weiss grew up in Brooklyn, New York, until 1969 when his family moved to the Rockaway Beach area of Queens, New York, where he attended Beach Channel High School. He entered Berklee College of Music in 1977, dropping out after a semester.

== Career ==
=== Music (Lewis King) ===
Using the name "Lewis King," Weiss became drummer for the Anglo-American neo-Rockabilly band the Rockats in March 1981. In May 1981 the Rockats recorded and released Live at the Ritz for Island Records, produced by Kenny Vance, formerly of Jay and the Americans. The album spent seven weeks on the Record World Album Charts, hitting a high of 177 on August 22, 1981. In March 1982, the band recorded two studio tracks with producer Mike Thorne, “Make that Move”, and “One More Heartache”, which would later be released on 1983’s Make that Move EP for RCA Records.

In August 1982 King began working with former Rockat Tim Scott McConnell and recorded the Sire Records EP Swear, produced by Richard Gottehrer. The backing band included former Boyfriends, and Holly and the Italians’s bass player Mark Sidgwick. The title track was later covered by Sheena Easton.

During this period King also worked as a studio technician, assisting on a number of Richard Gottehrer recordings including the Bongos Numbers With Wings EP for RCA Records and Joe King Carrasco and the Crowns Party Weekend for MCA Records.

King joined Beat Rodeo in 1985, recording 1986’s Scott Litt-produced Home in the Heart of the Beat for IRS Records.

In 1987, King began working with singer songwriter Elliott Murphy, whose band included former Modern Lovers bass player Ernie Brooks. They recorded the album Change Will Come for the New Rose record label.

In 1988 King joined his former Beat Rodeo partner George Usher in his band House of Usher. The group recorded the 1990 release “Neptune" for the Lonesome Whippoorwill label.

Weiss reconnected with his former Rockats band-mates for sporadic reunion shows in 2008, 2012, and 2013, and recorded several tracks with them which appeared on the 2013 Lanark Records release Rockin’ Together.

=== Television ===
Returning to his given name, Weiss began working for KCTS Television, Seattle’s PBS affiliate in 1992. Through 2003, Weiss helped manage national and international productions, including documentaries which were broadcast as part of the American Experience and American Masters series.

In 2004 he began working for Seattle Channel, the city of Seattle’s government-access television station. Between 2007 and 2017, Weiss helped lead a team which won the Excellence in Government Programming award (often referred to as “the best municipal TV station in the nation”) from the National Association of Telecommunications Officers and Advisors (NATOA), eight times.

=== Author ===
Weiss’s first book, Stranded in the Jungle: Jerry Nolan's Wild Ride - A Tale of Drugs, Fashion, the New York Dolls, and Punk Rock, was released in September 2017. On September 14, 2017 it became the number one new release in Amazon.com’s “Punk Musician Biographies” category. On October 1, 2017, it hit number one. The foreword was written by Chris Stein of Blondie. Reviews were mainly positive; Rob Ross wrote in popdose.com, “…Mr. Weiss is a damned fine writer. There’s none of the deifications that writers tend to do when writing about a “hero” of theirs; it’s objective, fact-filled – painstakingly researched and simply fascinating…” Jimi LaLumia wrote in PunkGlobe that, “‘Stranded In The Jungle’ is a must read…”; Joe Whyte wrote in LouderthanWar.com, “I can safely say that Curt Weiss’s “Stranded In the Jungle”…is up there with “Please Kill Me”, “England’s Dreaming”, Andy Blade’s “Teenage Punk Rocker” and our own Brother John Robb’s “Punk; An Oral History” as one of the best accounts of the era of punk rock and the preceding years and aftermath.” Michele Kirsch wrote in Glass Magazine, “…forensically detailed and brilliantly written… It’s one of those books that is so good, you get a mild panic attack as you approach the end of it…”

Negative critiques from Simon Wright in Only Rock and Roll, point out, “…the lamentably tabloid title…,” and notes that though, “…Weiss is himself a drummer…occasionally he discusses Nolan’s technique in some detail: I wish there was more of this.”

== Discography (As Lewis King) ==
- Rockats Live at the Ritz - Island Records, 1981
- Rockats Make That Move - RCA Records, 1983
- Tim Scott Swear - Sire Records, 1983
- Joy Ryder Tired of Phoney - RCA Records, 1984
- Beat Rodeo Home in the Heart of the Beat - IRS Records, 1986
- Elliott Murphy Change Will Come - New Rose Records, 1988
- Gornack Brothers Refund - Strike Back Records, 1988
- House of Usher Neptune - Lonesome Whippoorwill Records, 1990
- Rockats Rockin’ Together - Lanark Records, 2013

== Filmography (partial) ==
- American Experience: Gold Fever, Unit Manager, 1997
- Take This Heart, Unit Manager, 1997
- American Masters: Vaudeville, Unit Manager, 1999
- The ACLU: A History, Unit Manager, 1999
- Perilous Fight: America's Second World War in Color, Unit Manager, 2003
- The Video Game Revolution, Unit Manager, 2004
- Exploring Space: The Quest for Life, Unit Manager, 2005
- KEXP: Live at the Triple Door, Producer, 2005

== Bibliography ==
- The New York Dolls Jerry Nolan; Classic Drummer Magazine #22; April/May/June 2006
- Rockats: Rockin’ Together (Liner Notes); Lanark Records; April 2013; LNR079
- Stranded in the Jungle: Jerry Nolan's Wild Ride; Backbeat Books; September 2017; ISBN 978-1495050817
