= Night Lights (Elliott Murphy album) =

Studio album by Elliott Murphy
- Released: 1975
- Recorded: Autumn 1975
- Studio: Electric Lady Studios, New York City
- Genre: Rock
- Label: RCA
- Producer: Steve Katz

Elliott Murphy chronology
Lost Generation (1975)	Night Lights (1975)	Just a Story from America (1977)

Professional ratings
Review scores
Source	Rating
Allmusic	4/5 stars
Christgau's Record Guide	C+

Night Lights is the third major label album by singer-songwriter Elliott Murphy produced by Steve Katz and recorded at Electric Lady Studio. It was reviewed by Dave Marsh in Rolling Stone, where he wrote, "In 1973 and 1974 it seemed to many of us in New York that it was a tossup whether Bruce Springsteen, the native poet of the mean streets, or Elliott Murphy, the slumming suburbanite with the ironic eye, would become a national hero." The album featured guest appearances by fellow Long Island native Billy Joel and former Velvet Underground member Doug Yule. The cover photo of Murphy standing in Times Square early one Sunday Morning was taken by photographer Michael Dakota although stylised by Steven Meisel. The song "Lady Stilletto" was thought to be an homage to Patti Smith.

== Track listing ==
All tracks composed by Elliott Murphy

1. "Diamonds by the Yard"
2. "Deco Dance"
3. "Rich Girls"
4. "Abraham Lincoln Continental"
5. "Isadora's Dancers"
6. "You Never Know What You're In For"
7. "Lady Stilletto"
8. "Lookin' For a Hero"
9. "Never As Old As You"

== Personnel ==
- Elliott Murphy – vocals, acoustic and electric guitar, harmonica, keyboards
- Billy Joel – piano on "Deco Dance"
- Mike Braun – drums, percussion
- Andy Paley – drums, percussion
- Michael Brecker, Howard Johnson, Lou Marini, Lew Soloff, Tom Malone – horns on "Deco Dance"
- Ernie Brooks – bass
- Richard Davis – double bass
- Jerry Harrison – organ, piano, ARP string synthesizer
- Steve Katz – backing vocals on "Lookin' For a Hero"
- Ralph Schuckett – organ, piano, clavichord, horn and violin arrangement
- Doug Yule – guitar, backing vocals
- Mark Horowitz – pedal steel guitar on "Never As Old As You"
- Harry Lookofsky – violin on "Deco Dance"

Technical

- Dave Wittman – engineer
- Acy Lehman – art direction
- Dennis Katz – cover concept
- Michael Dakota – photography
