= Murph the Surf (album) =

Studio album by Elliott Murphy
- Released: 1982
- Studio: Sundragon Studios, Manhattan, New York
- Genre: Rock
- Label: Courtisane
- Producer: Elliott Murphy

Elliott Murphy chronology
Affairs (1980)	Murph the Surf (1982)	Party Girls & Broken Poets (1984)

Professional ratings
Review scores
Source	Rating
Allmusic	3/5 stars
Hi-Fi News & Record Review	A:1

Murph the Surf was the second independent album by singer-songwriter Elliott Murphy and was distributed widely throughout Europe on Disc AZ in France and CBS Records in Sweden.

== Track listing ==
All tracks composed by Elliott Murphy

1. "Continental Kinda Girl"
2. "Off The Shelf"
3. "Baby I've Been Thinkin'"
4. "Modern Romance"
5. "You've Got It Made"
6. "Fall of Saigon"
7. "Dusty Roses"
8. "Calling on Cathleen"
9. "Garden City"
10. "Blue Towers"

== Personnel ==
- Elliott Murphy – vocals, guitar, harmonica, keyboards
- Tony Machine – drums
- Ernie Brooks – bass
- Richard Sohl – keyboards
- Jesse Chamberlain – drums
- Peter Gordon – saxophone, synthesizer

Technical

- Michael Ewing – engineer
- Charlie Hunter – cover art and design
