= The Running Man (soundtrack) =

2025 album by Steven Price

The Running Man (Music from the Motion Picture)

Film score by Steven Price
- Released: 14 November 2025
- Recorded: 2024–2025
- Studios: Abbey Road Studios, London
- Genre: Film score
- Length: 68:07
- Labels: Milan; Paramount Music
- Producer: Steven Price

Steven Price chronology
Oh, Hi! (2025)	The Running Man (2025)	Coyote vs. Acme (2026)

The Running Man (Music from the Motion Picture) is the film score to the 2025 film The Running Man directed by Edgar Wright and starring Glen Powell, William H. Macy, Lee Pace, Michael Cera, Emilia Jones, Daniel Ezra, Jayme Lawson, Sean Hayes, Colman Domingo, and Josh Brolin. The film score is composed by Steven Price and released through Milan Records and Paramount Music on 14 November 2025.

== Background ==
In September 2025, it was announced that Steven Price composed the film score for The Running Man. He previously collaborated with Wright on The World's End (2013), Baby Driver (2017) and Last Night in Soho (2021). The soundtrack featuring 25 tracks was recorded at the Abbey Road Studios in London. It was released through Milan Records and Paramount Music on 14 November 2025.

== Reception ==
Zanobard Reviews wrote 7/10 and wrote "Steven Price's propulsive score for The Running Man surges a determined theme for Ben Richards through a dark, moodily electronic dystopian soundscape, with a whistling Western-styled motif for the Hunters and a contrastingly upbeat piece for the Running Man show itself hurtling after him for a pretty relentless but nonetheless enjoyable soundtrack chase overall."

David Rooney of The Hollywood Reporter and Owen Gleiberman of Variety described the score "exciting" and "thrilling". Ritika Srivastav of India Today wrote "Steven Price's music hits that commercial sweet spot." Nikki Baughan of Screen International called it a "pounding score". Ronak Kotecha of The Times of India wrote "Steven Price's pulsating score complements the relentless chase, ensuring the pace rarely dips". Mark Hughes of Forbes described it "a propulsive score from Steven Price that teeters between adrenaline and irony". Meagan Navarro of Bloody Disgusting described it as "bombastic music".

== Track listing ==
No.	Title	Length
1.	"The Running Man"	4:00
2.	"I'm Not Angry"	1:52
3.	"Introducing Bobby"	1:38
4.	"Insubordination"	2:07
5.	"Rules of the Run"	2:26
6.	"If I Die on This Show"	2:45
7.	"They Will Walk Among You"	1:32
8.	"Target Acquired"	2:16
9.	"Nowhere to Run and Nowhere to Hide"	3:35
10.	"Stop Filming Me"	1:17
11.	"I'm Still Here"	1:58
12.	"The Network Owns the News"	1:27
13.	"Someones Following Us"	2:22
14.	"We Got Him"	1:15
15.	"You Can't Kill an Idea"	3:02
16.	"I Am the Initiator"	4:20
17.	"Keep Your Eyes Open"	5:45
18.	"Look at All These People Who Know the Truth"	4:03
19.	"I'm Out of Time to Save Your Life"	3:27
20.	"Altitude Alert"	1:19
21.	"This Is My Show Now"	3:41
22.	"They Can't Lie to Us If You Don't Watch"	2:57
23.	"This Time You'll Play Your Part"	1:54
24.	"Turn It Off"	3:33
25.	"This Game Is No Game"	3:52
Total length:		68:07

== Personnel ==
Credits adapted from Paramount Music:

- Music composer and producer: Steven Price
- Executive album producer: Edgar Wright
- Studio: Abbey Road Studios
- Recording: John Barrett
- Score recordist: Daniel Hayden
- Assistant engineer: Neil Dawes
- Mixing: John Barrett, Gareth Cousins
- Mixing assistant: Daniel Hayden
- Mastering: Alex Wharton
- Music editor: Bradley Farmer K.
- Assistant music editor: Charlie Curtis
- Score editor: Wes Hicks

Orchestra

- Conductor: Geoff Alexander
- Lead orchestrator: David Butterworth
- Orchestrators: Geoff Alexander, Evan Rogers
- Music preparation: Tristan Noon
- Music contractors: Amy Stewart and Amy Ewen for Isobel Griffiths
- Orchestra Leaders: Jeremy Isaac and John Mills

Musicians

- Violin: Jeremy Isaac
- Celli: Ian Burdge, Caroline Dearnley
- Piano: Dave Arch
- Drums: Freddy Sheed
- Synths, guitar: Steven Price

== Accolades ==
Award	Date of ceremony	Category	Recipient(s)	Result	Ref.
Hollywood Music in Media Awards	November 19, 2025	Best Original Score – Sci-Fi/Fantasy Film	Steven Price	Pending	
