= Emilio Ruiz Barrachina =

Spanish poet, writer and film director

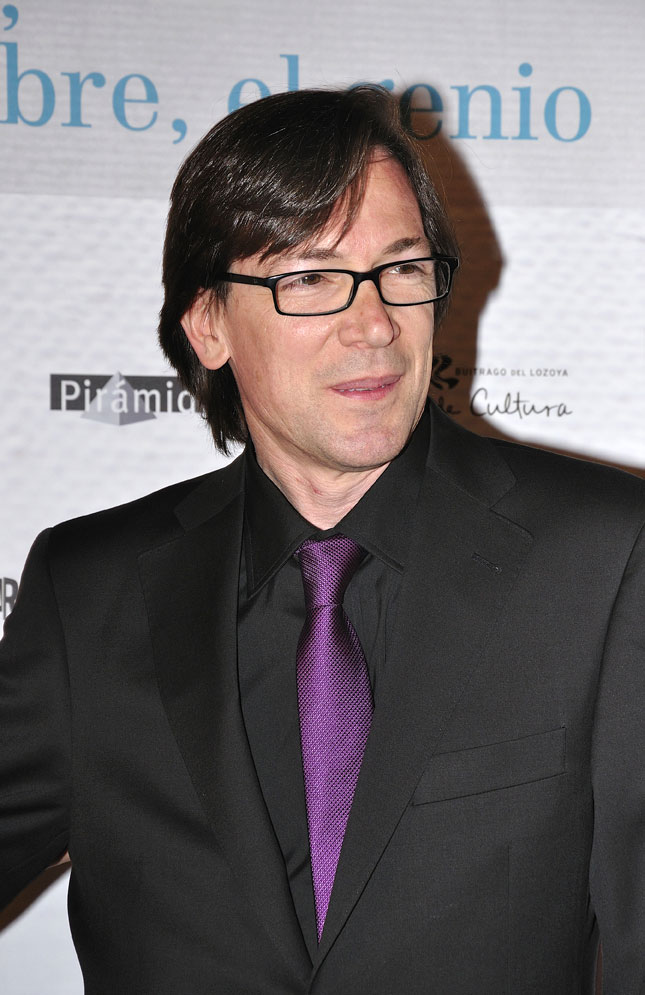
- Born: 26 June 1963 (age 63); Madrid, Spain
- Occupations: Director, writer, journalist

Emilio Ruiz Barrachina (born 26 June 1963) is a Spanish poet, writer and film director.

== Biography ==
Ruiz Barrachina was born on 26 June 1963 in Madrid. In 1997, after living for 10 years in Latin America as a journalist, including for being a correspondent for BBC Latin America, he returned to Spain.

His first novel, Calamarí (1998), has been republished in various editions. This would be followed up by A la sombra de los Sueños (2000), adapted to film; El arco de la luna (2001), winner of the X Premio Internacional de Novela Luis Berenguer; the essay Brujos, reyes e inquisidores (2003); the novel No te olvides de matarme (2004), which in 2005 made its debut as a theatrical adaption; the literary essay Tinta y Piedra. Calaceite, el pueblo donde convivieron los autores del Boom (2005); and Le ordeno a usted que me quiera (2006).

In 2007, Ruiz Barrachina won the Rubén Darío International Award of Poetry with the book Arroyo. This would be followed up by the book La venta del paraíso (2006), translated to various languages and was adapted to film shortly thereafter. Along with, he has directed documentaries for film and television such as Luz, espacio y creación, Tinta y Piedra, Niñas Soldado, Desminadoras en Sudán, Emigrantes o Lorca, and El mar deja de moverse (about the death of poet Federico García Lorca, and which has won several international awards).

In 2008, he released the documentaries Orson Welles y Goya and La España de la Copla. In 2010, he directed the controversial film El Discípulo. This would be followed up by the musical film Morente in 2011, which was considered the posthumous legacy of singer Enrique Morente. In 2012, Ruiz Barrachina launched La venta del paraíso, which won Best Original Story award at the New York City International Film Festival.

He wrote, in 2014, the poetry collection "La Huella Eterna", which won him the Premio Internacional de Poesía Sial Pigmalión, given for this work and his entire literary career. In 2015, Ruiz Barrachina released the film El violín de piedra, about rural flight, and starred Carlos Álvarez-Nóvoa. In its presentation at the Festival Internacional de Cine y Arquitectura de Oviedo (Ficarq, at Teatro Campoamor) and won the awards for Best Director, Best Main Actor, and Best Music.

In 2017, he premiered an adaptation of Yerma by Federico García Lorca, which made a version in English in the modern day, and was filmed between Madrid, Buitrago del Lozoya, and London. In 2018, Ruiz Barrachina directed and released an adaptation of the theatrical piece La Casa de Bernarda Alba, again by García Lorca, under the title of Bernarda and starring Assumpta Serna, Victoria Abril, and Miriam Díaz Aroca.

In 2020, between Paris and New York, he directed the film Broken Poet, starring Elliott Murphy, Bruce Springsteen, and Joana Preiss. That same year, he released the feature-length film, El abuelo Victor. Victor Manuel para Imprescindibles on TVE about Víctor Manuel.

In 2021, Ruiz Barrachina would also premiere Tristesse, filmed in Asturias. It as a winner at the New York City International Film Festival. There, the film won the awards the Best Film, Best Director, Best Main Actor (Enrique Simón), Best Supporting Actress (Rebecca Arrosse), and Best Photography (David Ramos).

In 2022, he premiered Frente al Silencio, a film that has won prizes at various international festivals. This film links the Holocaust with flamenco and the discrimination at the beginning of the 21st century that still exists against race, gender, and condition. It won, among others, the prizes for Best Documentary, Best Director, and Special Jury Prize at the Adolph Zukor International Film Festival; Best Documentary at the New York City International Film Festival, and Best Narrative Film at the Artist Forum International Film Festival New York.

In July 2023, Ruiz Barrachina directed the theatre play La Comedia Sin Título by García Lorca. Based on the unfinished work, he accomplished the drama, weaving it with the realiza la dramaturgia hilándolo con la attention and the subsequent assassination of Lorca based on the studies of Miguel Caballero. La Comedia Sin Título was premiered on 7 and 8 July at the Teatro Campoamor de Oviedo.

== Controversies ==
In December 2017, Provincial Prosecutor's Office of Madrid sought two years in prison against Barrachina and those who were responsible for three movie theatres for inflating ticket office data and be able to access a grant for more than half a million euros for the film El discípulo. The office contended that Barrachina artificially inflated the number of moviegoers in the implicated theatres in order to obtain a grant from the Institute of Cinematography and Audiovisual Arts (ICAA), according to the Ministry of Education, Culture, and Sports. The accused had pretended, according to what the Prosecutor's Office wrote, that 341,284 Euros had been collected, about 11,000 Euros more than the minimum needed to receive the help.

Barrachina, on 15 August 2011, solicited the ICAA for general and complementary assistance on the amortization of feature-length films for 2010 for El discípulo, which starred Juanjo Puigcorbé, among others, for 576,107.06 Euros, which was given in November 2011 and paid by December.

Barrachina was acquitted on 4 May 2021, as, according to the sentencing, there never was a crime nor fundamental reasoning for the litigation.

== Filmography ==
=== Films ===
Year	Film
2022	Frente al silencio
2021	Tristesse
2020	El abuelo Victor. Victor Manuel
2020	Broken Poet
2018	Bernarda
2017	Yerma
2015	El violín de piedra
2012	La venta del paraíso
2010	El discípulo
2006	Lorca. El mar deja de moverse
2005	Pequeños crímenes perfectos
2004	A la sombra de los sueños

=== Documentaries ===
Year	Film
2019	El abuelo Víctor
2011	Morente
2010	Luis Rosales. Así he vivido yo SECC
2008	La España de la Copla Canal Sur
2008	Orson Welles y Goya
2007	Zindia. Niñas soldado Lola Films. Sudán
2007	Winnie. El negocio de la Paz Lola Films. Sudán
2006	¿Por qué Juan Carlos? Serie documental (4 capítulos). Telemadrid.
2005	Luz, espacio y creación Encargo del Gobierno de Suiza
2004	Calaceite. Tinta y Piedra TVE
2004	Suiza y la migración TVE
2003	El Transcantábrico TVE. Serie documental (5 capítulos)

=== Theatrical works ===
Year	Work
2023	La Comedia Sin Título

== Publications ==
- "Estación Libertad" (novela) La esfera de los libros, 2016
- "La Huella Eterna" (poesía) Sial. Premio Internacional de Poesía Sial Pigmalión. 2014
- Calamarí (novela) Espasa-Calpe. Auryn 1998. Círculo de Lectores 2004. Ediciones Zeta 2008.
- Brujos, reyes e inquisidores (ensayo), Belaqcua Barcelona 2003. Ediciones Zeta, Madrid 2008.
- Arroyo, Sial. Madrid, 2007. III Premio Internacional de Poesía Rubén Darío.
- Le ordeno a usted que me quiera, Lumen. Barcelona, 2006.
- La venta del paraíso (novela), Bruguera. Barcelona, 2006.
- Tinta y piedra (ensayo), Imagine Ediciones y Diputación de Teruel. Madrid 2005.
- No te olvides de matarme, Apóstrofe. Madrid 2004.
- El arco de la luna, Algaida, Sevilla 2001. Premio Internacional de Novela Luis Berenguer.
- A la sombra de los sueños, Brand Editorial. Madrid, 2000. Espasa (bolsillo), 2002. Imagine Ediciones, 2004.
- Diccionario Enciclopédico, Círculo de Lectores (América), 2000. Director editorial.
- Cuarto Poder, la absorción de los medios de comunicación por los grupos financieros. Castillo Editorial, Bogotá, Colombia, 1996.
- Historia de Colombia (Dirección General y redacción Conquista y Colonia), Zamora Editores. Bogotá, Colombia, 1994.

== Awards ==
=== Film awards ===
- Award for Best Narrative Film at The Artist Forum International Film Festival New York 2022 for Frente al Silencio
- Award for Best Documentary Film at New York City International Film Festival 2023 for Frente al Silencio.
- Award at Orion International Film Festival 2022 for Frente al Silencio.
- Award for Best Director and Best Film at the Adolph Zukor International Film Festival for Frente al Silencio.
- Award for Best Director for Tristesse at the New York City Film Festival in 2021.
- Tristesse award for Best Film at the New York City Film Festival in 2021.
- Best Director. Festival Internacional de Cine de Oviedo (Ficarq). 2015. "El Violín de Piedra".
- Best Original Story New York International Film Festival. 2013. "La Venta del Paraíso".
- Finalist for Film from the 2012 Goya Awards, nominated for Best Documentary: Morente
- Musiclip Fnac Award, Best Musical Documentary of 2011: Morente.
- Best Flamenca Film Award 2011. Festival del Cante de las Minas de la Unión: Morente.
- Best Film, Best Production, and Best Main Actor Awards from International Filmmaker UK: El discípulo.
- Best Director and Best Film Awards from the Adolph Zukor International Film Festival for Frente al Silencio.

=== Literary awards ===
- International Award from Poesía Sial Pigmalión for the whole of his literary work. 2014.
- X Premio Internacional de Novela Luis Berenguer. Algaida, Spain, Algaida, 2001: El arco de la luna.
- III Premio Internacional de Poesía Rubén Darío. Pen Club. Sial, 2007: Arroyo.

=== Magazine Awards ===
- Simón Bolívar National Award of Journalism, Bogotá, Colombia, 1993, Best Television Interview.
- Simón Bolívar National Award of Journalism, Bogotá, Colombia, 1993, Best Television Report.
