= Party Girls / Broken Poets =

Studio album by Elliott Murphy
- Released: 1984
- Genre: Rock
- Label: Dejadisc
- Producer: Elliott Murphy

Elliott Murphy chronology
Murph the Surf (1982)	Party Girls / Broken Poets (1984)	Milwaukee (1985)

Professional ratings
Review scores
Source	Rating
Allmusic	3/5 stars

Party Girls / Broken Poets marked a partial return to a major label for singer-songwriter Elliott Murphy and was distributed throughout Europe on WEA and in the US on the independent Austin, Texas label Dejadisc. The album was nominated for the 1984 New York Music Award for Album of the year. Special guests included former New York Dolls front man David Johansen who contributed guest vocals on "Blues Responsibility" as well as Violent Femmes member Brian Ritchie contributed a bass solo on the title cut "Party Girls and Broken Poets."

== Track listing ==
All tracks composed by Elliott Murphy

1. "Three Complete American Novels"
2. "Winners, Losers, Beggars, Choosers"
3. "Doctor Calabash"
4. "Blues Responsibility'"
5. "Saving Time"
6. "Party Girls and Broken Poets"
7. "Like a Rocket"
8. "Last Call"
9. "Something New"
10. "The Streets of New York"
11. "In a Minute"
12. "Everybody Knows (Niagara Falls)"

== Personnel ==
- Elliott Murphy – vocals, guitar, harmonica, keyboards
- Tony Machine – drums
- Ernie Brooks – bass
- Richard Sohl – keyboards
- David Johansen – guest vocals
- Brian Ritchie – guest guitarist
