= Beach Channel High School =

Public school in New York City

Beach Channel High School (H.S. 410)
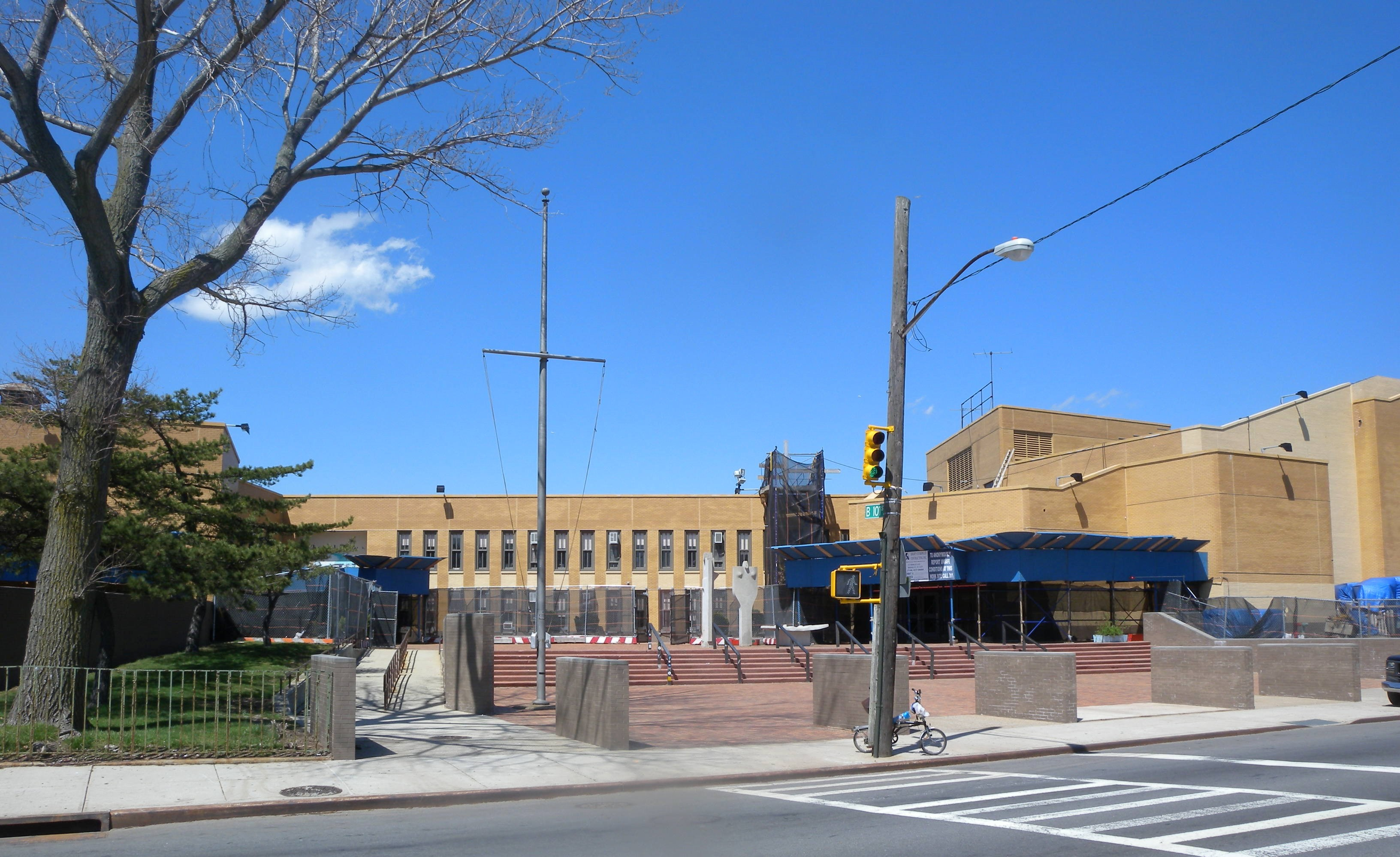

Location
- 100-00 Beach Channel Drive; Rockaway Park, Queens, New York City, New York; United States; 40°35′08″N 73°49′31″W

Information
- Type: Public High School
- Established: 1973
- Closed: 2014
- School district: Administrative District 27
- Principal: David Morris
- Faculty: 129 (2005)
- Grades: 9–12
- Enrollment: 2,175
- Campus: Urban
- Colors: Light Blue, Gold
- Mascot: Dolphin
- Website: Beach Channel High School

Beach Channel High School (BCHS) (also known as High School 410 or H.S. 410), was a high school in the public school system of New York City, located at 100-00 Beach Channel Drive in Rockaway Park in the borough of Queens. The school opened in 1973, grew to over 2,150 students by 2006, and closed in 2014.

The school was built on the edge of Jamaica Bay and had a private dock. It offered a College Now program, which allowed students to get college credit through programs at Rikers Island, Kingsborough Community College and Southampton College (part of Stony Brook University). LaGuardia Community College offered classes at the school for reading skills improvement with a separate special education school was located in one wing of the campus. In November 2009, the New York City Department of Education announced that the school could possibly be closing in 2010 due to its status as a low-performing school. Beach Channel High School graduated its last class in 2014.

The building now houses several small schools: Channel View School for Research, Rockaway Park High School for Environmental Sustainability, Rockaway Collegiate High School, and the P256Q@Gateway Academy of special education.

Channel View School for Research A school for 6th-12th graders, combines a focus on getting to college with hands-on activities and expeditions. The combination has produced high attendance and graduation rates and better-than-average preparation for college. A partnership with Jet Blue Airlines provides internships for older students and free flights for college visits.

Rockaway Park High School for Environmental Sustainability offers students an opportunity to develop carpentry and culinary skills.

Rockaway Collegiate High School offers students additional time and support to help them be successful in high school and college by extending school hours and adding a summer program. Students develop study plans with teachers and are required to submit portfolios of their work.

== Principals ==
- Dr. David Morris (October 2003–June 2014)
- Barbara Pleener (September 2003–October 2003)
- John Marcus, Acting Principal (February 2003–September 2003)
- Andrea Holt (September 2002–February 2003)
- Bernard Hopkins Gassaway (April 1997–June 2002)
- Sandra C. Hassan (February 1988–April 1997)
- Arthur Greenberg (September 1981–January 1987)
- Robert L. Rappaport (September 1973–June 1981)

Bernard Gassaway, principal from the late 1990s until 2002, is credited with improving the school over his tenure. He went on to become a superintendent of schools. In 2006, he published the book Reflections of an Urban High School Principal, Yo... about his experiences.

In September 2003, Barbara Pleener was installed as principal. Controversy in the form of alleged "threatening and insubordinate" comments on the part of a faculty member followed. In October 2003, allegations surfaced regarding alleged improprieties at Jamaica High School, where Pleener had been principal in 1999; she was never charged. Students and parents protested and Pleener stepped down.

== Economics ==
On November 11, 2006, BCHS's economics program received a "Blue Star" certification for the second year in a row for its financial literacy program, as 49 of the 50 students who participated in the WISE Financial Literary Exam passed. The school was one of only 45 schools receiving certification from 139 that applied. The award, offered by the New York Financial Literacy Coalition, is a free program created to increase the number of high school students who are financially knowledgeable and literate.

== Music ==
The Beach Channel High School Marching Band, Concert Band and Jazz Ensemble were well-known in Southern Queens. Under the direction of Barry Domfort, the band performed at Lincoln Center for the Performing Arts, Queens College, John F. Kennedy International Airport, Forest Park, Boys and Girls High School, Brooklyn College, and Antun's. The Marching Band performed at St. Patrick's Day, Ethnic Pride and Memorial Day parades in Manhattan and Queens and at Disney World twice. The Jazz Ensemble performed at various local venues including Russo's On The Bay and The Beach Club. The band has also performed for political figures including former President Bill Clinton and former Secretary of State Hillary Clinton. BCHS had a history of music educators, including Sidney Kolodney, Jack Nowinski, Louis Barella, Alex Leicht and Gerald Brazel.

== Arts ==
In the late 1970s and early 1980s, the Art Department, under Renee Darvin, attracted a talented and diverse number of art teachers, including Bruce Degen who later went on to create The Magic School Bus series of children's books and television shows with Joanna Cole. Renee Darvin later served as Director of Art for the New York City Board of Education and a lecturer at the Teachers College at Columbia University. During their tenure at Beach Channel, the arts program offered a wide array of near-college-level courses including an afterschool life drawing program for advanced students.

In 2000, artist Julie Dermansky undertook a project for the Department of Cultural Affairs for New York City and decorated the fencing and floors of the day care center with works entitled Ocean Fence and Ocean Floor.

== Sports ==
Beach Channel High School had one of the only Crew (rowing) teams in New York City. Christian Horn was the head coach of the team, after the retirement of William Stein, who served as head coach for two decades. In 1983, the boys' varsity team participated in the Henley Regatta in Oxford, England, with only one 8-man boat and 8 oars. The team was co-ed, made up of both boys and girls four (both consisting of five individuals; a coxswain, two "port" rowers, and two "starboard" rowers), and an eight (a coxswain, four "port" rowers, and four "starboard" rowers). In 2004, they again played in the Queens Championship game losing to Richmond Hill High School.

== Notable alumni ==
- Jill Eisenstadt (Class of 1981) — author
- Folorunso Fatukasi — defensive end for the New York Jets.
- Richard Kessler (Class of 1976) — Executive Dean, College of Performing Arts, The New School and Dean of Mannes School of Music.
- Perry Kivolowitz (Class of 1977) — Academy Award (SCITECH) winner, business person, teacher
- Barry Klarberg (Class of 1978) - minority owner of the New York Yankees and talent manager
- Jeff Scott — Professor of French horn at Oberlin Conservatory. Award-winning musician and educator.
- Lauren Vélez (Class of 1982) — actress
- Jay Walder — former chairman of the Metropolitan Transportation Authority.
- Curt Weiss (class of 1977) — Former drummer for the Rockats and Beat Rodeo and author of Stranded in the Jungle: Jerry Nolan's Wild Ride (2017).
