= Selling the Gold =

Studio album by Elliott Murphy
- Released: 1995
- Studio: ICP
- Label: Musidisc
- Producer: Djoum, Elliott Murphy

Elliott Murphy chronology
Unreal City (1993)	Selling the Gold (1995)	Going Through Something: The Best of Elliot Murphy (1996)

Selling the Gold is an album by the American musician Elliott Murphy, released in Europe 1995. It was released in the United States in January 1996. Murphy, who had for years been selling better in Europe, shot a video for "Love to America". Murphy supported the album with a North American tour.

== Production ==
Recorded at ICP Studios, in Brussels, Belgium, the album was produced by Djoum and Murphy. Bruce Springsteen sang on "Everything I Do (Leads Me Back to You)". Violent Femmes played on "King of the Serpentine". Sonny Landreth appeared on "Then I'm Gonna Make Love to You". "Is Fellini Really Dead" is a tribute to the director, for whom Murphy had worked. "Selling the Gold" is about selling a ring to a pawn shop. "Buddy and Peggy Sue" examines a couple on a road trip.

== Critical reception ==
Professional ratings
Review scores
Source	Rating
AllMusic	3/5 stars
MusicHound Rock: The Essential Album Guide	4/5 stars
The Republican	3/5 stars

Newsday likened the album to Murphy's debut, writing that, "from the instrumentation to the thematic material, the two records, decades apart, draw a portrait of a troubadour who's stuck to his guns." The Hartford Courant stated the Murphy's lyrics are "tightly wound novellas with strong images and fresh metaphors." The St. Louis Post-Dispatch praised "Taste the Good Life" and "Love to America". Tulsa World noted that Murphy "tells rambling tales with a probing, decadent post-hippie perspective."

Stereo Review opined: "He plays acoustic guitar for texture and clear-toned leads for embellishment, while his voice—a Lou Reed by Bob Dylan urban-folk burr that shapes words with a poet's open heart and a rocker's offhand wit—is an unmistakable instrument in its own right." The Fort Worth Star-Telegram wrote that "Murphy weaves his pithy, highly intelligent narratives and observations (mainly about America in these twisted times) into 11 mainly country-flavored songs." The Daily Herald deemed Selling the Gold "a mature work by one of the best rock singer-songwriters you've probably never heard of."

AllMusic called the album "a group of folk-rock songs full of highly literate lyrics that commented on modern life from an ironic perspective."

== Track listing ==
No.	Title	Length
1.	"Love to America"
2.	"Take Your Love Away"
3.	"Everything I Do (Leads Me Back to You)"
4.	"Taste the Good Life"
5.	"Selling the Gold"
6.	"A Whole New World"
7.	"Buddy and Peggy Sue"
8.	"Real Times"
9.	"Is Fellini Really Dead"
10.	"Then I'm Gonna Make Love to You"
11.	"King of the Serpentine"
