= Playa del Inglés =

Resort in Gran Canaria

Coordinates: 27°45′34″N 15°34′27″W

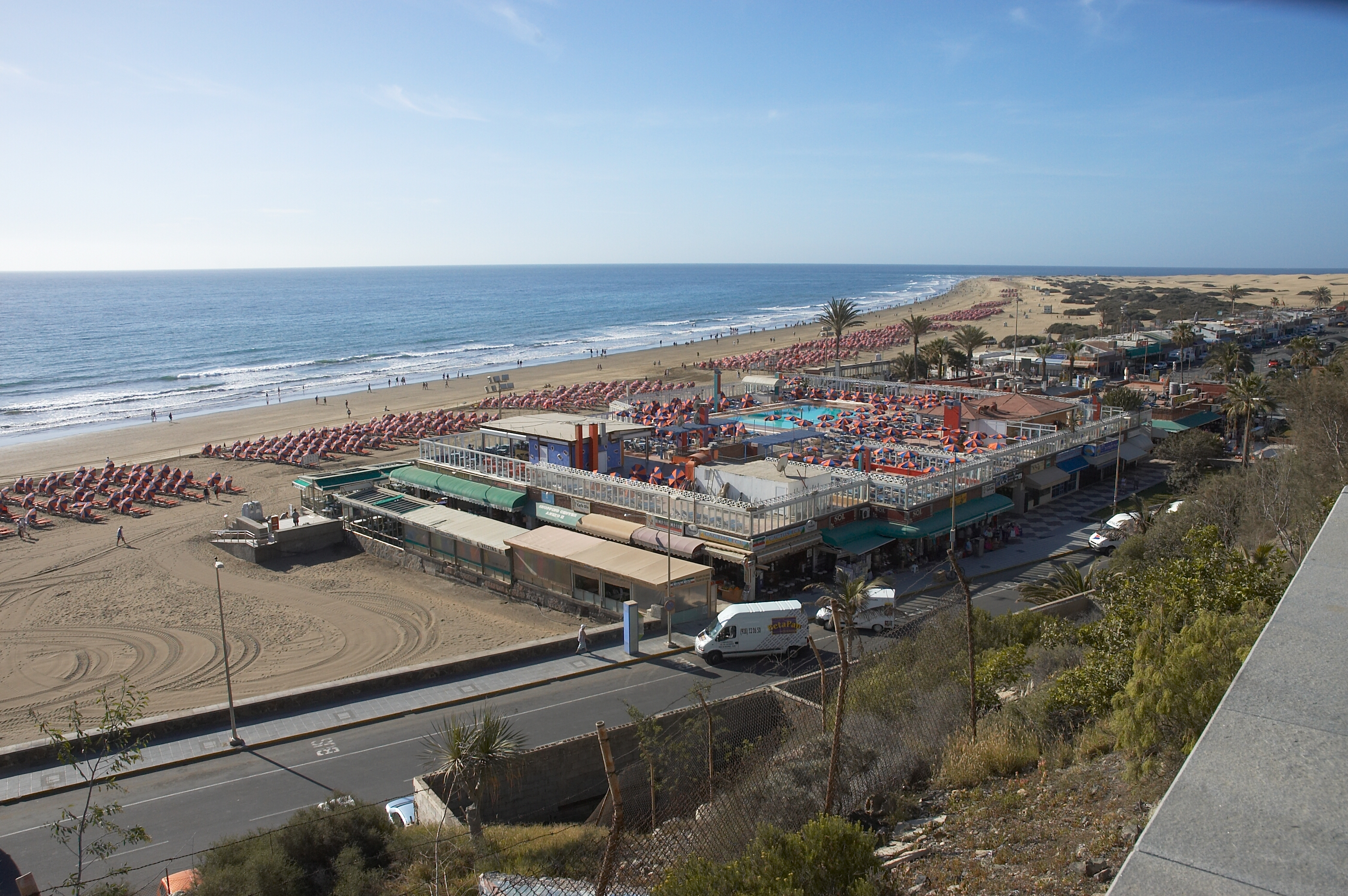
The shopping district along Playa del Inglés

Playa del Inglés (Spanish: [ˈplaʝa ðel iŋˈɡles]; English: Englishman's Beach) is a beach resort in Maspalomas on the south coast of the island of Gran Canaria in the Canary Islands. It is part of the municipality of San Bartolomé de Tirajana, and is a popular tourist attraction. The resident population was 7,515 in 2013.

There is some dispute upon the origin of the resort's name. One explanation is that an English bohemian moved to the untouched area early in the 20th century. However, it has been stated that the Bohemian was actually French, but was mistaken as English by the locals.

== Geography ==
Playa del Inglés forms part of the larger Maspalomas sea resort zone, together with the adjacent resort towns San Agustín, and Sonnenland. The Maspalomas Dunes are situated south of the resort.

The area remained largely unspoiled until the 1960s when large scale tourist development changed the resort. Many of these constructions were large concrete tower blocks, however many have undergone renovation in recent years to make them more sympathetic to the surrounding area. There are a number of large shopping centres in the resort with the 'Yumbo' and 'Kasbah' being the largest.

== Yumbo Centrum ==
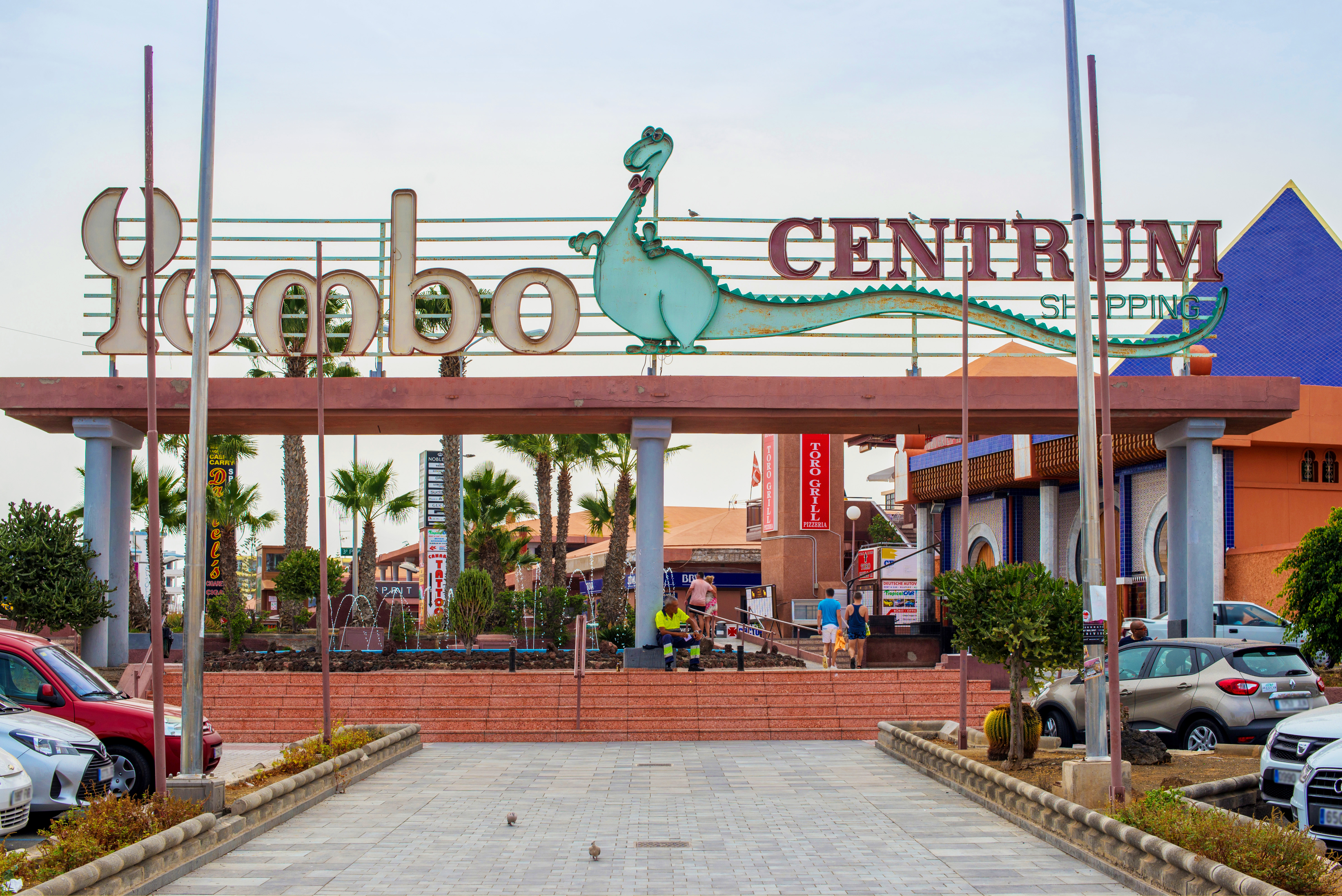
The Yumbo Centrum entrance

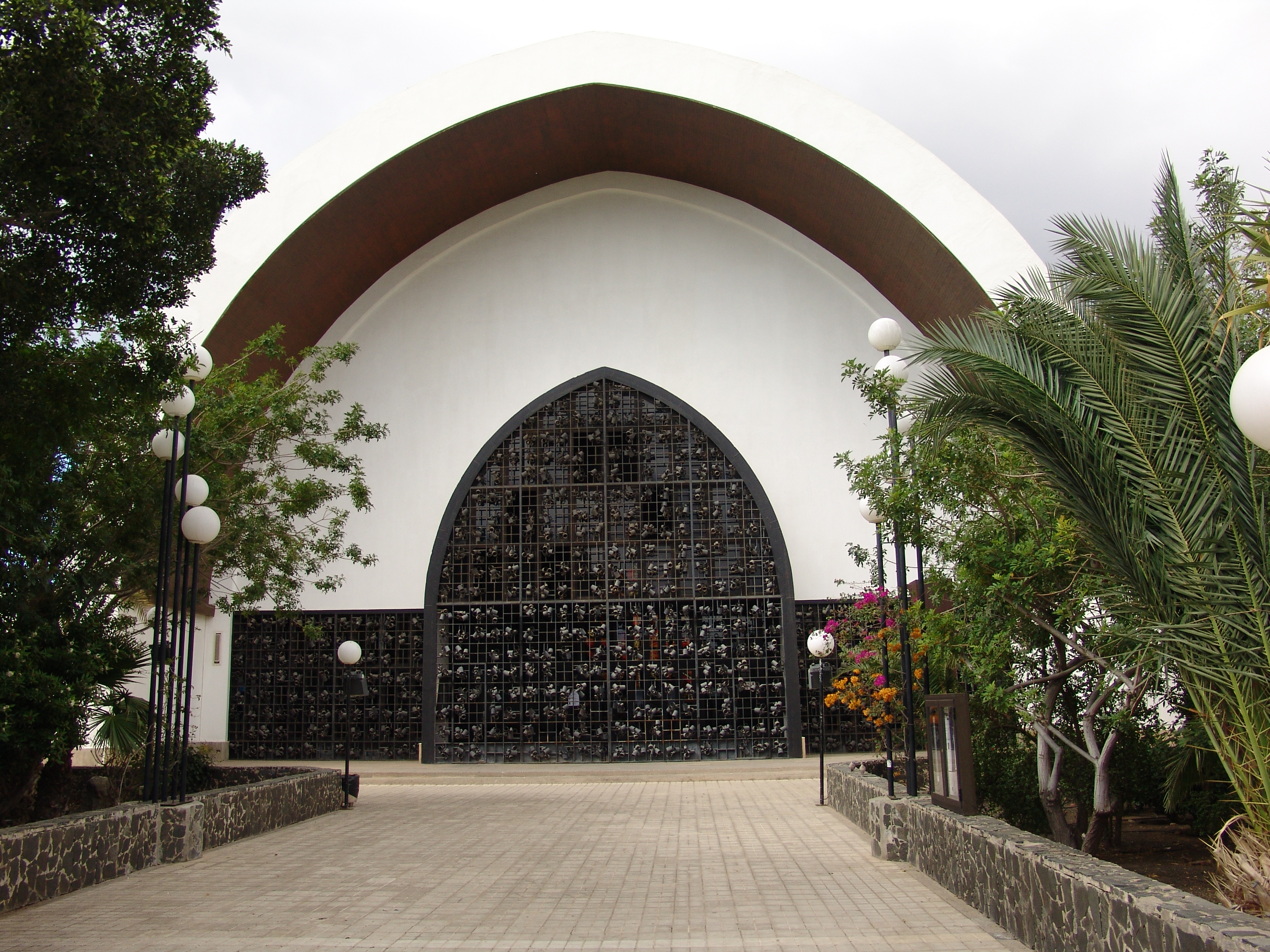
Ecumenical Temple

Playa del Inglés has been associated with gay travellers for over 25 years, but is now a clubbing town. Despite the fact that the Canaries are primarily Catholic, the locals have embraced gay tourism. The main area for gay and gay-friendly bars, clubs and accommodation is the Yumbo Centrum shopping centre and its surrounding area. There are at least 30 venues catering to gay mainstream and specific tastes including: leather, drag, cabaret, sport, cruising and men/women only.

There is also a gay beach, which is situated in the Maspalomas beach area around hut 7.

Each year in the second week of May, one of the largest gay pride festivals in Europe is held in and around the Yumbo Centre. The 2011 event was attended by more than 100,000 people.

In 2013, a fire broke out in the early hours of the morning during the Pride event, causing much damage to the southern section of the centre, affecting Cruise, Amigos, Chez Funnyboys and Ricky's Showbar. The cause of the fire is unknown but was rumored at the time to be an arson attack by an aggrieved staff member. Most bars re-opened later in the week thanks to the efforts of the workers.

== Gallery ==
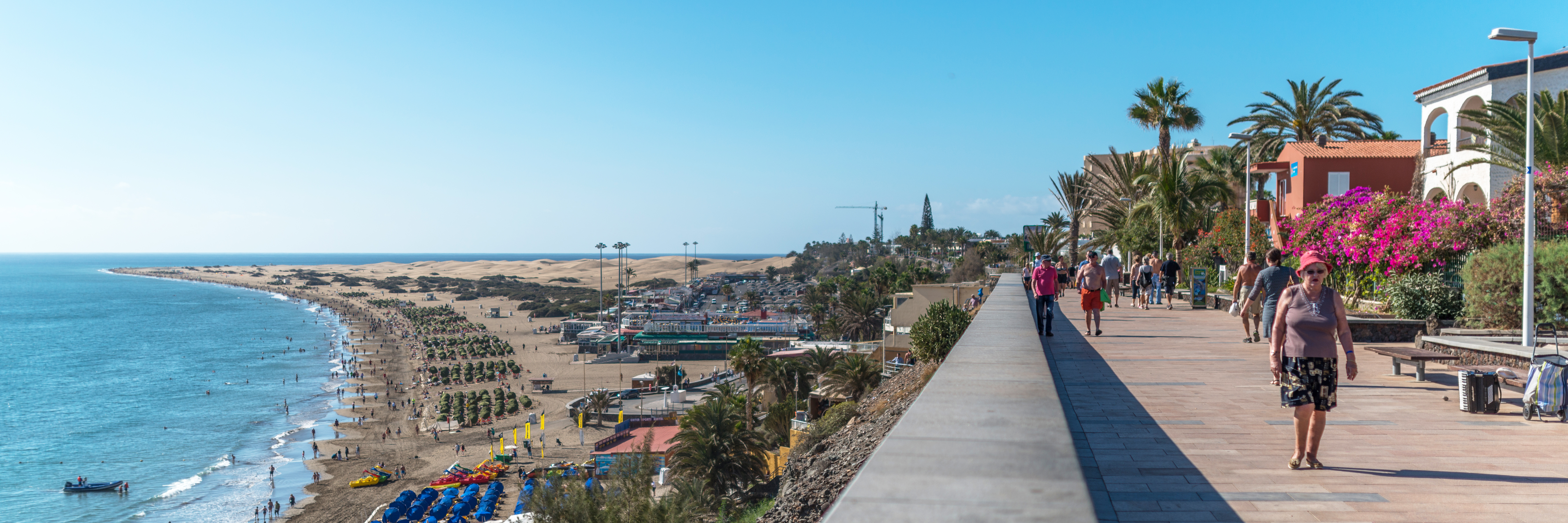
Playa del Inglés 2016

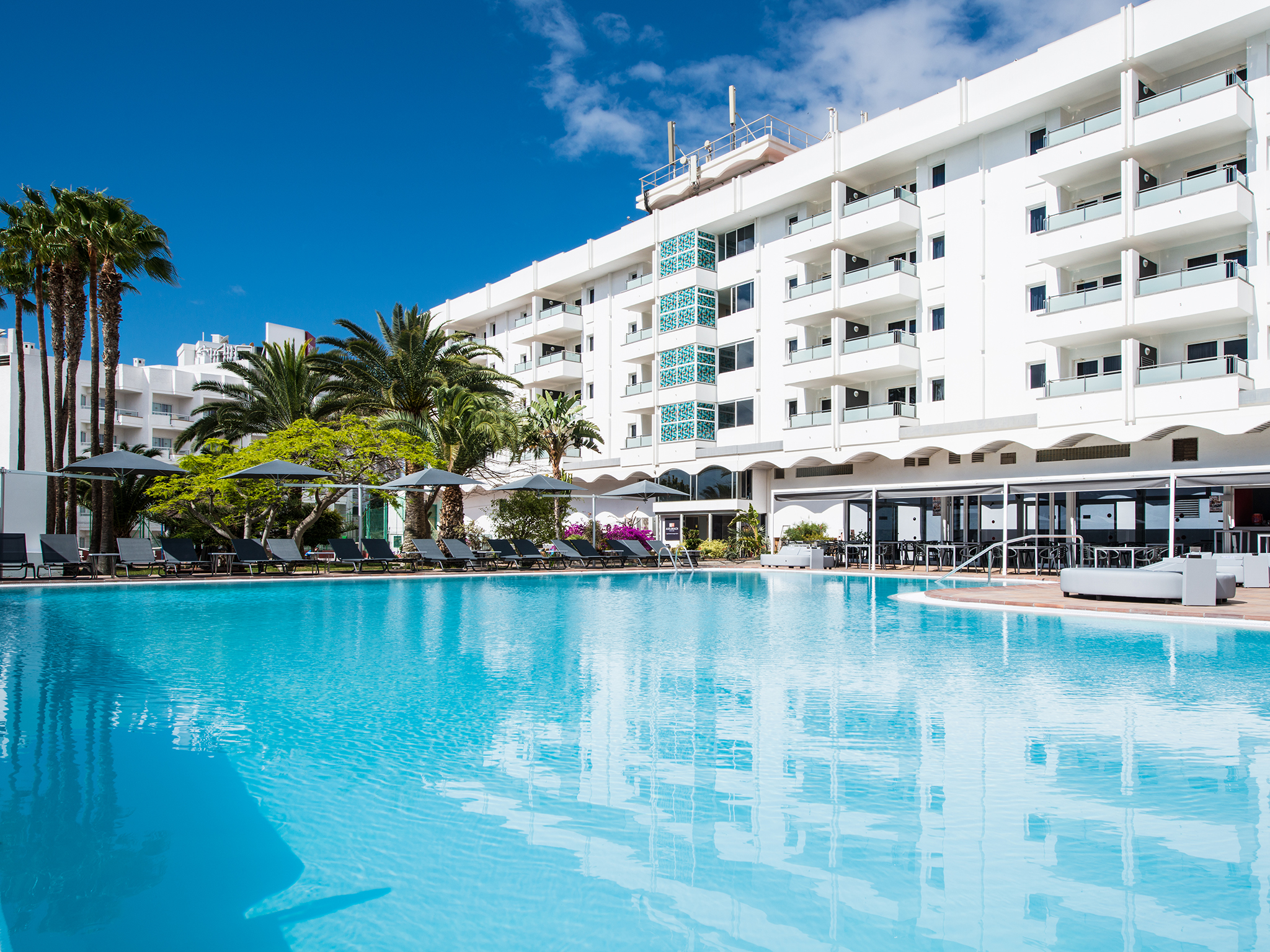
Playa del Inglés

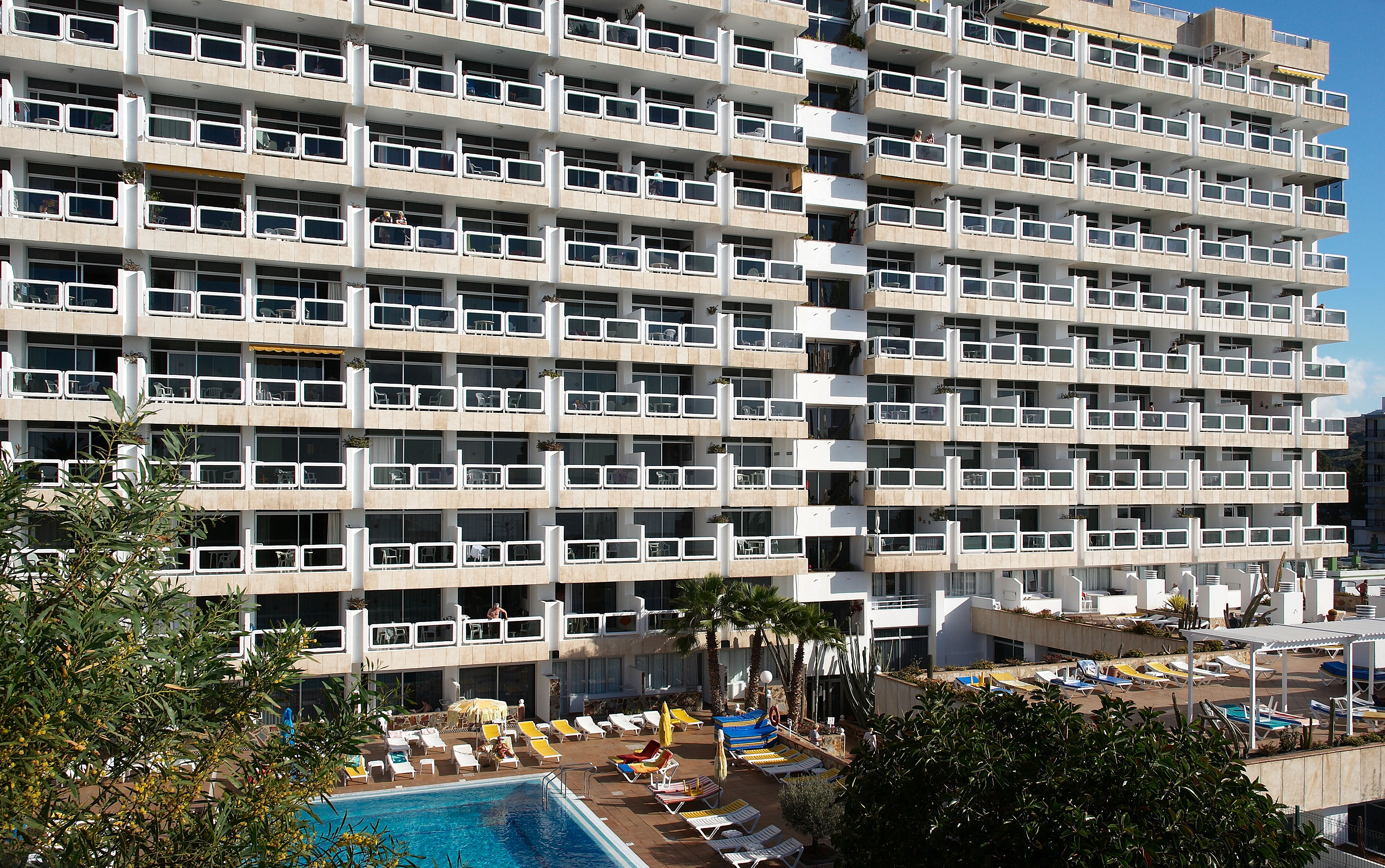
Playa del Inglés Euro Palace Hotel

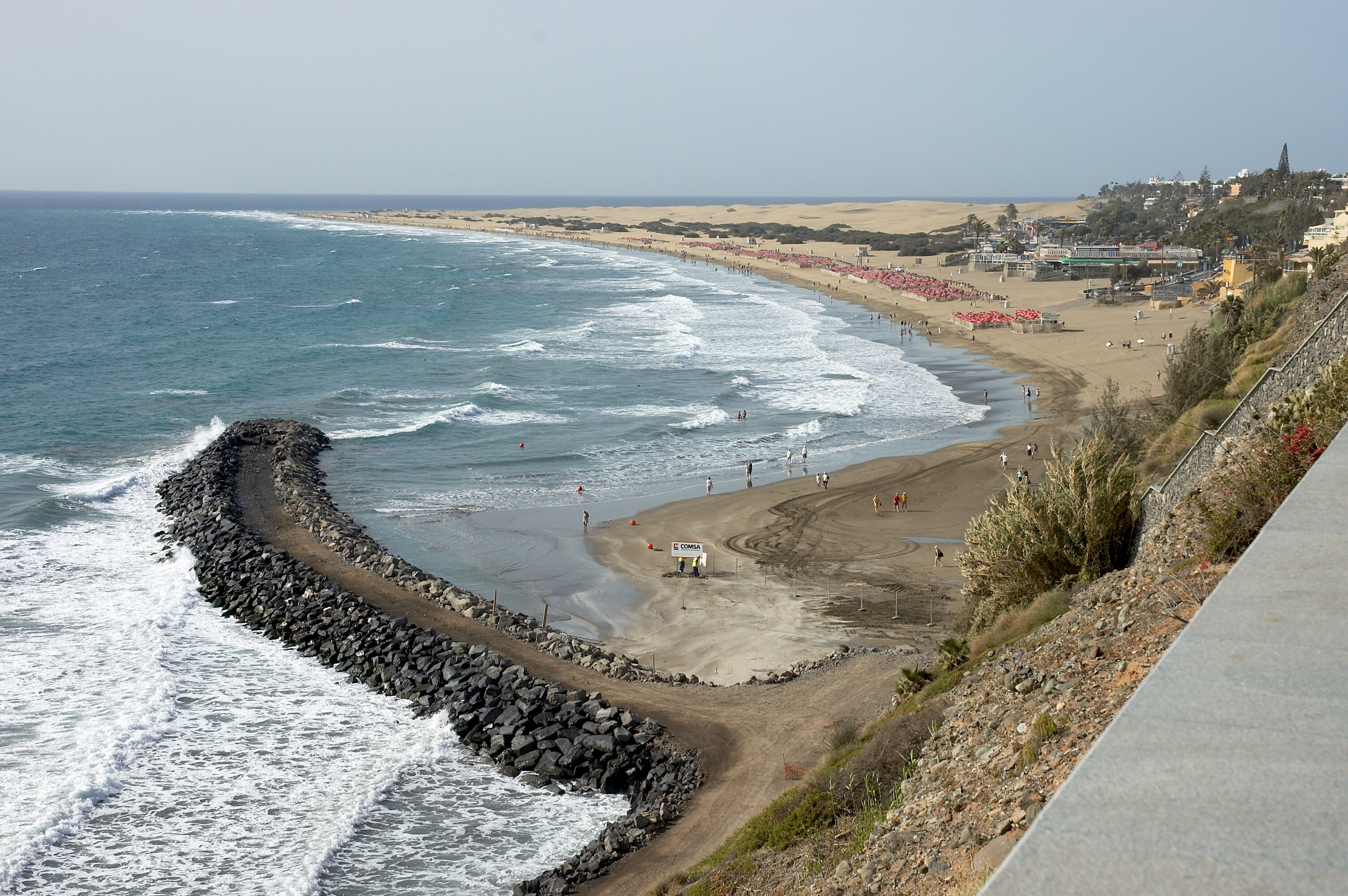
Playa del Inglés beach

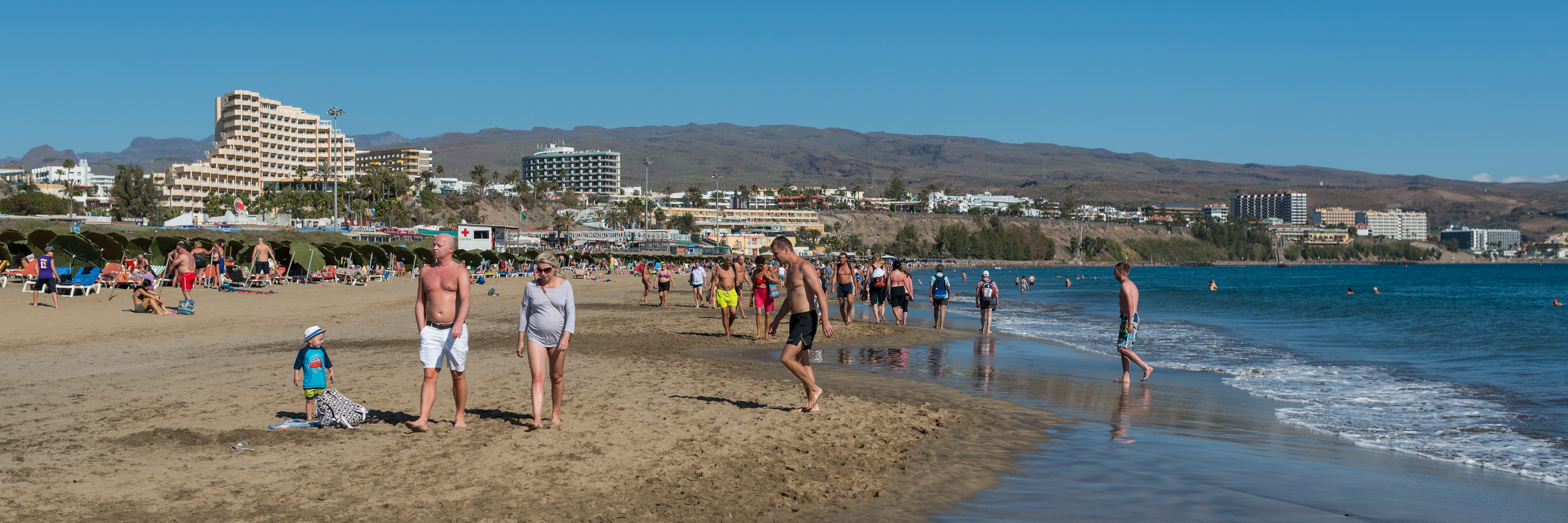
Playa del Inglés
