= Folorunso Fatukasi =

American football player (born 1995)

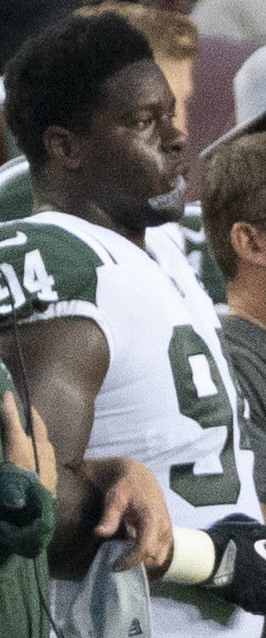
- Fatukasi with the New York Jets in 2018

No. 94 – Las Vegas Raiders
- Position: Defensive tackle
- Roster status: Active

Personal information
- Born: March 4, 1995 (age 31); Far Rockaway, New York, U.S.
- Listed height: 6 ft 4 in (1.93 m)
- Listed weight: 318 lb (144 kg)

Career information
- High school: Beach Channel (Rockaway Park, New York)
- College: UConn (2013–2017)
- NFL draft: 2018: 6th round, 180th overall pick

Career history
- New York Jets (2018–2021); Jacksonville Jaguars (2022–2023); Houston Texans (2024–2025); Las Vegas Raiders (2026–present)

Career NFL statistics as of 2025
- Total tackles: 195
- Sacks: 7
- Forced fumbles: 1
- Fumble recoveries: 1
- Pass deflections: 7
- Stats at Pro Football Reference

Folorunso Ifeyinka "Foley" Fatukasi (born March 4, 1995) is an American professional football defensive tackle for the Las Vegas Raiders of the National Football League (NFL). He played college football for the UConn Huskies.

== College career ==
In 2015, Fatukasi was named as an honorable mention on the 2015 All-American Athletic Conference football team.

== Professional career ==
Pre-draft measurables
Height	Weight	Arm length	Hand span	Wingspan	40-yard dash	10-yard split	20-yard split	20-yard shuttle	Three-cone drill	Vertical jump	Broad jump	Bench press
6 ft 3 3/4 in (1.92 m)	318 lb (144 kg)	34 1/8 in (0.87 m)	10 1/4 in (0.26 m)	6 ft 10 in (2.08 m)	5.29 s	1.76 s	3.00 s	4.53 s	7.44 s	30.0 in (0.76 m)	9 ft 4 in (2.84 m)	33 reps
All values from NFL Combine

=== New York Jets ===
Fatukasi was selected by the New York Jets in the sixth round (180th overall) of the 2018 NFL draft.

In his rookie season, 2018, Fatukasi took just 3 snaps on defense, playing in one game. He was inactive for the other 15 games, but nonetheless made his NFL debut on November 25, 2018 against the New England Patriots. He did not record any stats in the limited action.

In 2019, he appeared in 14 games as a reserve, recording 27 total tackles (14 solo), 7 tackles-for-loss, 3 quarterback hits, and one pass defensed. He recorded his first career sack in Week 15 against the Pittsburgh Steelers. He played in 40% of defensive snaps and 29% of special teams snaps.

In 2020, he started 8 games and appeared in 15, logging 42 total tackles (22 solo), 6 tackles-for-loss, 5 quarterback hits, and two passes defensed. He added 2 sacks, a forced fumble, and a fumble recovery, while playing in 47% of defensive snaps and 34% of special teams snaps.

Fatukasi was placed on the reserve/COVID-19 list by the team on December 17, 2020, and activated on December 22.

In 2021, Fatukasi played in 15 games with the Jets, starting all 15 and recording 46 total tackles (25 solo), 5 tackles-for-loss, and 6 quarterback hits. He played on a career-high 53% of defensive snaps, as well as 15% of special teams snaps.

=== Jacksonville Jaguars ===
On March 16, 2022, Fatukasi signed a three-year, $30 million contract with the Jacksonville Jaguars.

In his first season with the team, he made 13 starts, playing in a total of 14 games, and recorded 24 total tackles (13 solo), 2 tackles-for-loss, 3 quarterback hits, 1.5 sacks, and 3 passes defensed. He played on 46% of defensive snaps, but only played one snap on special teams.

Fatukasi was released on March 5, 2024.

=== Houston Texans ===
On March 19, 2024, Fatukasi signed with the Houston Texans on a $5.13 million contract. He started 11 games, recording 24 tackles and one sack.

On May 13, 2025, Fatukasi re-signed with Houston on a one-year, $3.5 million contract. On October 4, Fatukasi was placed on injured reserve due to a shoulder injury.

=== Las Vegas Raiders ===
On August 15, 2026, Fatukasi signed with the Las Vegas Raiders.

== Personal life ==
Fatukasi is of Nigerian descent. His brother Olakunle Fatukasi is a linebacker who played for the Tampa Bay Buccaneers in 2022 and currently plays for the St. Louis Battlehawks.
