= Sonnenland =

- District
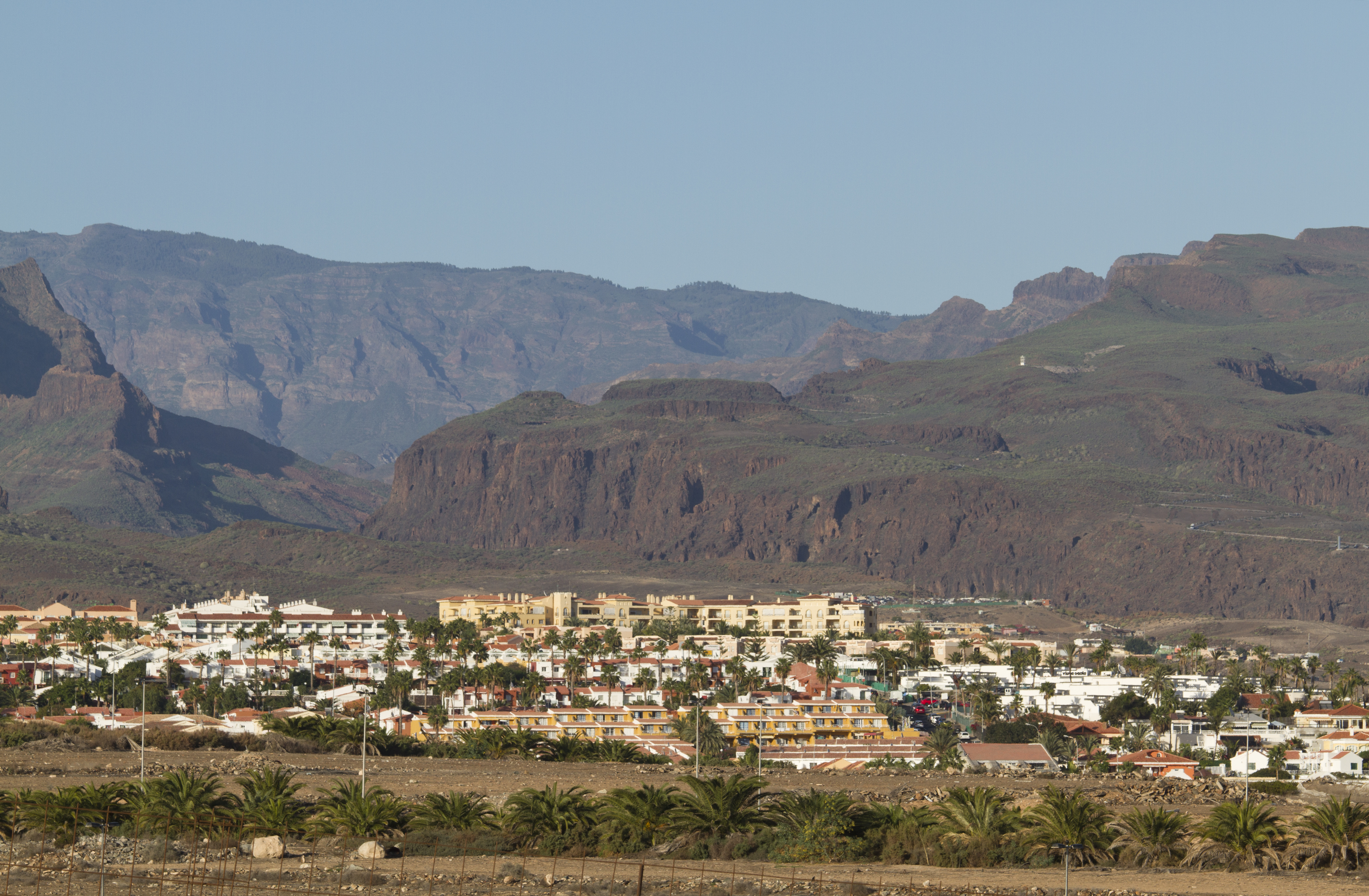
- View of Sonnenland

- Location in Canary Islands
- Coordinates: 27.760°N 15.602°W
- Country: Spain
- Autonomous community: Canary Islands
- Province: Las Palmas
- Municipality: San Bartolomé de Tirajana
- Postal code: 35100

Sonnenland (German for "the land of sun") is a district of San Bartolomé de Tirajana in the south of Gran Canaria, set on a hillside above Maspalomas and Playa del Inglés. Originally designed for expatriates, it is gradually becoming home to a growing number of Spanish residents, many of whom work in the surrounding tourist areas such as Arguineguín, Maspalomas, and Puerto Rico.

Sonnenland was constructed in the 1980s, chiefly with bungalows. Since the late 1990s also some villas and hotels have been built.

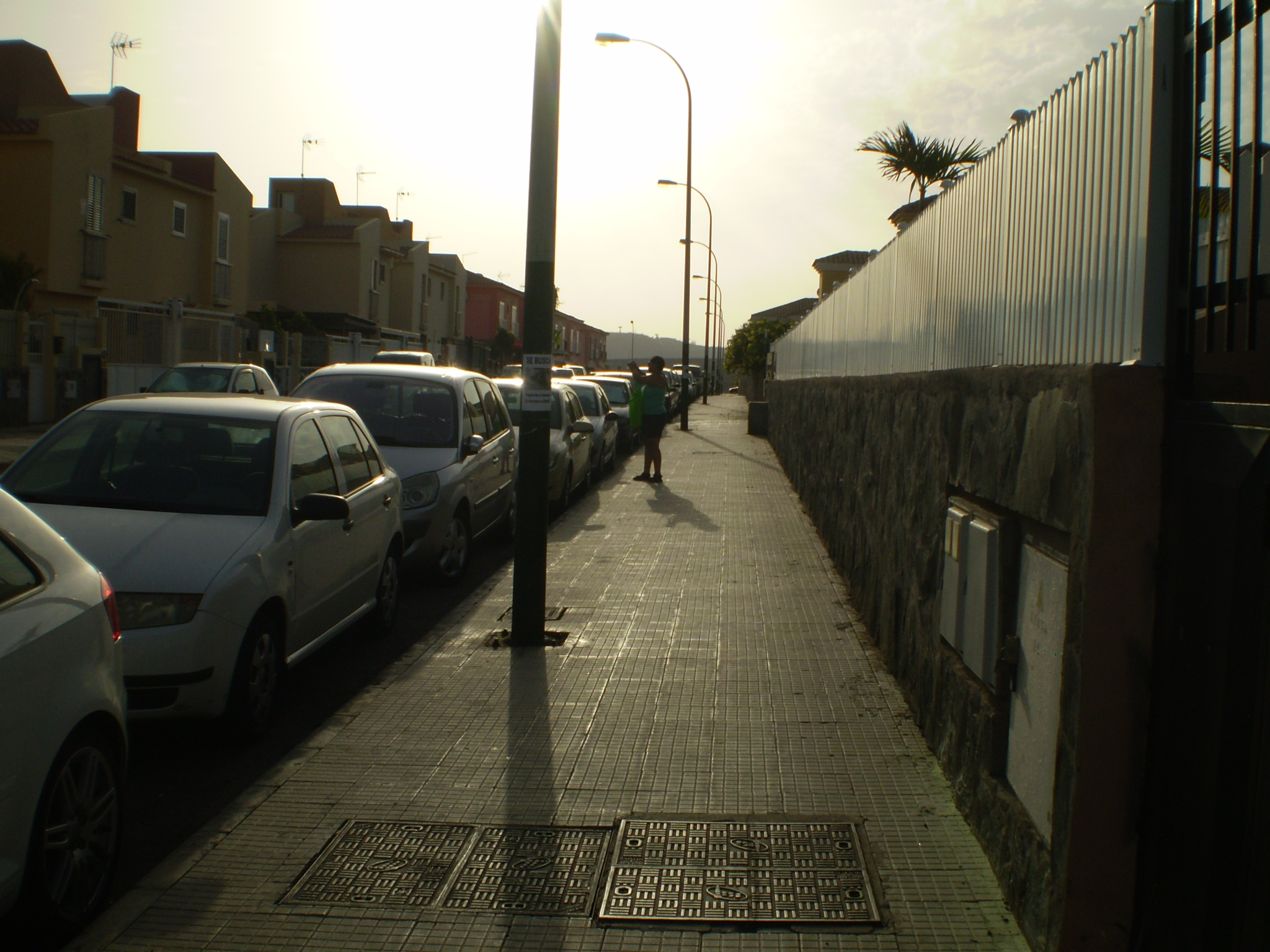
Holiday apartments on Calle Thomas Edison, Sonnenland
