= Boarding Gate =

- English-language release poster
- Directed by: Olivier Assayas
- Written by: Olivier Assayas
- Produced by: François Margolin
- Starring: Asia Argento; Michael Madsen; Carl Ng; Kelly Lin; Alex Descas; Kim Gordon; Joana Preiss
- Cinematography: Yorick Le Saux
- Edited by: Luc Barnier
- Music by: Brian Eno
- Distributed by: ARP Sélection (France); MK2 Diffusion (International)
- Release dates: 18 May 2007 (Cannes Film Festival); 22 August 2007 (France)
- Running time: 106 minutes
- Countries: France; Luxembourg
- Languages: English; French; Cantonese
- Budget: $2.8 million
- Box office: $985,000

Boarding Gate is a 2007 French thriller film about the sophisticated power plays between a debt-ridden underworld entrepreneur, his provocative and ambitious ex-associate and a manipulative young couple who employ her. Written and directed by Olivier Assayas, the film features an international cast comprising Asia Argento, Michael Madsen, Carl Ng and Kelly Lin. Kim Gordon also plays a supporting role as an enigmatic businesswoman forced to intervene as events unfold in Hong Kong.

The film premiered 18 May at the 2007 Cannes Film Festival and later opened in France on 22 August 2007.

== Plot ==
=== Paris ===
After discussing his plans for retiring by selling on the shares in his security company to his debtors with his partner, André, aging underworld entrepreneur Miles Rennberg is paid a surprise visit at his Paris office by aggressive underworld moll Sandra. Brazenly taunting him with her sexuality, she bluntly dissects their prior relationship—a nightmarish web of masochism, money, manipulation and dependency, pimping her out to dangerous clients in order to gain both a business advantage and perverse personal thrills.

She outlines her newest ambition, since their estrangement, of raising the necessary capital to run a nightclub in Beijing. Miles makes no pretense of the fact that he is less interested in the proposal than the woman, and encourages her to visit him at his apartment.

Without making any promises, Sandra leaves for her job at an import business, run by a young married couple: Lester and Sue Wong.

Sandra's own import sideline, drug running, is facilitated by her close bond of loyalty with low-ranking employee Lisa. Acting as her driver and lookout, Lisa escorts Sandra to the site of a drug deal that quickly goes sour when her buyer is revealed to be a Narcotics officer. Suspicious after Sandra's cool response to his earlier queries about a missing container in a recent shipment, Lester follows Sandra to the deal and accosts Lisa as she waits in the car. He sends Lisa away on his motorcycle and takes her place in the car.

After Sandra emerges, Lester drives her away from the scene. Expressing disappointment in her deceit, he takes her back to her apartment where it becomes clear that the two are romantically involved. After their sexual encounter, Lester receives a call from his wife and leaves.

Sandra appears to relent and arranges to visit Miles at his apartment. Goading him with recollections of their misdeeds, she reveals a deep-seated bitterness; she recalls, in particular, an incident where a group of Japanese clients she was entertaining drugged and raped her, and Miles' arousal at hearing the episode recounted in front of his girlfriend. They both drink and end up on the balcony. Sandra undresses and tries to instigate a violent sexual game, apparently of the genre they used to practice, by pinning Miles to the floor of the balcony and choking him with his own belt. Miles warns her off and leads her back inside to show her a pair of handcuffs, which he intends to use on her later in the evening. She expresses reluctance which he nonchalantly waves aside. When she tries to leave, he locks the door and pockets the keys.

After he takes a business call, she playfully restrains him with the handcuffs, then brutally shoots him in the head.

She quickly retraces her steps through the house, destroying evidence of her presence, and makes a swift exit with Miles' keys. Lester picks her up, gives her a modest sum of cash and the name of a contact in Hong Kong who will arrange her new life, promising to join her soon. Lisa first drives her to a club to establish an alibi, where the oppressive atmosphere and the noise provoke an aggressively traumatic and regretful response to her act.

=== Hong Kong ===
Hours behind Lisa, Sandra arrives in Hong Kong. She makes her way to the address of Lester's contact, who in turn sends her to a nondescript office somewhere else in the city. She is told that her contact is waiting for her in an adjacent room, but as soon as she enters, the door is locked behind her. In the labyrinthine mess of the locked office she eventually discovers the bound and murdered body of Lisa in a chair facing the back wall.

A manifestly wealthy Western woman arrives at the office and orders the men to bring out Sandra while chastising them for Lisa's death. Eventually, one of the men in the office is sent in after Sandra. Having switched clothes and positions with the corpse of Lisa, she manages to ambush the henchman and escape onto the streets. Whilst crossing on a ferry she cries over her last souvenir of her relationship with Miles, his keys, before dropping them into the water. With little money and no recourse to her credit cards or passport, due to risk of capture and extradition for Miles' murder, Sandra resorts to repeatedly calling Lester.

She eventually manages to contact his wife, Sue, who maintains that Lester is unavailable but agrees to meet Sandra. Sue is evasive and aggressive, revealing that whilst she knew of Sandra's affair with Lester, Sandra was not her husband's first infidelity and he never really planned to leave his wife to join her. The whole venture was an attempt to raise the investment capital for the Beijing club, an enterprise in which Sue was fully complicit. Sue later takes Sandra to a karaoke club where she spikes Sandra's drink with a sedative.

In a back room, Sandra threatens Sue with a gun and demands more information; Sue pleads her innocence until Sandra succumbs to the sedative's effects. She leaves Sandra unconscious on the floor. Sandra wakes in the home of the wealthy Western woman whom she escaped in the offices earlier. The woman explains that she owes someone a favor and sets up Sandra with papers and well-paid employment in Shanghai.

Nonetheless, Sandra eschews the easy escape and tracks Lester down in a Hong Kong shopping mall. She follows him up the staircase with an unsheathed knife, but as she prepares to stab him she is interrupted by a group of women coming the other way. Lester enters an expensive restaurant, meets with Miles' business partner, André, and leaves with a sports bag full of cash — possibly a payment for Miles' murder, which ensured that his shares did not pass to his unscrupulous creditors. Sandra follows Lester down to the doorway out to the car park, where he hesitates at the threshold as if aware of her presence. At the last moment, however, she finds herself unwilling to either kill or confront him. He drives away with the money.

== Cast ==
- Asia Argento as Sandra, a young woman working in an import-export agency under the guidance of Lester and Sue Wang. In the past, whilst involved with entrepreneur Miles Rennberg, Sandra manipulated and seduced difficult and dangerous business clients to elicit information from them.
- Michael Madsen as Miles Rennberg, an ostensibly wealthy, middle-aged entrepreneur who manages a successful security company with his partner André. He has accumulated a great deal of debt from unknown sources, which he plans to repay by retiring early and passing his shares on to his creditors.
- Carl Ng as Lester Wang, a young Chinese man who runs an import-export agency with his wife Sue. He carries on an ambiguous affair with Sandra, his subordinate.
- Kelly Lin as Sue
- Alex Descas as André
- Kim Gordon as Kay
- Joana Preiss as Lisa

== Production ==
=== Origins and title ===
Writer-director Olivier Assayas cites the inspiration of the film's driving themes as a news story relating the murder of financier Édouard Stern during an S&M play session at the hands of his long-term lover, prostitute Cecile Brossard. The incident evoked the tone of his previous work on corporate deviancy, Demonlover, and he determined to use it as the pivotal event for a new script.

The title Boarding Gate was the director's second choice for the film. His first, departed—a reference to the passport stamp applied by Hong Kong border officials upon leaving the country—had to be scrapped during filming upon the 2006 release of Martin Scorsese's The Departed. The final title was selected since it evokes the many easy conduits in the film, "the idea of a passage between two worlds."

=== Budget ===
The film's style, described as "Eurotrash," is—according to Assayas—an experiment in "constructing a project around B-movie economics".

Assayas decided to embark on the "B-movie" concept after frustrating financial complications interminably delayed production of another of his projects, intended to be "a very French film focusing on provincial life;" similar circumstances led to making of his previous film with Maggie Cheung, Irma Vep. The total cost of the film was under €2 million.

=== Filming ===
The film was shot over six weeks in just two locations: Paris and Hong Kong. The Hong Kong crew was entirely local, with the exception of the cinematographer, the sound engineer, the assistant, the script supervisor, the line producer and the director himself. Most of the filming was done with hand-held cameras, and Assayas admits to having obtained some of his shots illegally due to the restrictive nature of local permits. These "guerrilla shots" were conducted with a skeleton crew of only four members, who quickly fled the scene afterwards.

The local team was also of such an unwieldy size that Assayas frequently invented projects or errands simply to clear the set.

=== Casting ===
Lead actress Asia Argento was considered by the director to be "inseparable from the narrative"; protagonist Michael Madsen was cast later via a mutual association with Nick Nolte, as Assayas conducted a search for an actor suited to the physical properties of the role. The scenes documenting their relationship, from the reunion after their long and awkward estrangement to the murder in his apartment, were shot in chronological order. Their first meeting was on camera, during the shoot of the reunion scene. Assayas remarks on Madsen's unpredictability as an actor, contributing his own small touches to his scenes. The choreography in the scene of violent sex play on Miles' balcony involving strangulation with a belt, for example, was vastly expanded by Madsen's suggestions.

Kelly Lin and Carl Ng, playing the ambitious Wong couple, were selected as good examples of the "new generation" of actors working in the Hong Kong film industry. Kim Gordon, whose acting roles had been considerably undemanding before Boarding Gate, had worked with Assayas previously with the music for Irma Vep and Demonlover. Based on her experience of living in Hong Kong in her youth and on her desire to further her acting career, Assayas cast her in a supporting role.

== Themes and significance ==
Wayne State University professor of English Steven Shaviro, author of The Cinematic Body, has composed a lengthy essay on the themes of conduits and interchangeability in the world of global capitalism as they are explored and visualized in Boarding Gate.

== Reception ==
The film has garnered mixed to negative reviews. Review aggregator Rotten Tomatoes reported that 31% of critics gave the film positive reviews, based on 45 reviews, with the website's critics consensus reading, "Boarding Gate has little substance beneath its faux-thriller surface, and marks a step down from director Olivier Assayas' usual work." Metacritic reported the film had an average score of 47 out of 100, based on 15 reviews.

Marketed as an "erotic noir-thriller", the film incited some tough criticism for the more explicit content which it explores, earning it the title of "a limp, sleazy inanity" with "a whiff of voyeuristic self-indulgence" in Variety's review of the film. Even the more positive pieces comment on this, such as Slant's review by David Pratt-Robinson, which remarks that lead actress Asia Argento "looks ready to rape anything in sight".

The film's acting inspired a wide range of critical opinion, although the view that Asia Argento is one of the most appealing aspects of Boarding Gate is nearly universal. The Village Voice's J. Hoberman takes this common remark to its extreme, when juxtaposed with a scathing review of the film—"There's basically only one reason to see Olivier Assayas's self-consciously hypermodern, meta-sleazy, English-French-Chinese-language globo-thriller Boarding Gate, and her name is Asia Argento."

Several reviews go as far as to imply that it is the inevitable product of the actress' own provocative attitude rather than simply a performance. Manohla Dargis, praising Argento's performance as striking, notes that her "on-screen ferocity" only nearly rivals her prominent tattoos and "the ease with which she sheds her clothes, which explains why I can describe those tattoos with confidence." Describing her as "aggressively carnal", New York magazine's David Edelstein makes the wry remark that he "can't help thinking there was a mix-up at the hospital and her dad was Klaus Kinski."

David Pratt-Robinson had a positive take on the character: "so fierce and so fragile,... a global misfit, a citizen of the world who can't quite find her place...yet, somehow, she makes the idea of being in transit feel like home." Whilst criticizing her general approach to acting as "bluffing her way through", The New Yorker's David Denby similarly describes Sandra as "lewd and hungry, but she's not boring — the character keeps changing, and you can see Argento's mind working behind all the viperish moves."

Little attention is generally given to other performances, summarized by Variety in the phrase "cast, whether native English speakers or not, woodenly recite their lines." However, Kim Gordon's "god-awful cameo" as businesswoman Kay is frequently singled out for criticism. She "gives one of the worst musician-turned-actor turns in recent memory," according to Joe Neumaier of the New York Daily News.

Boarding Gate was placed at 83 on Slant's best films of the 2000s.
