= Milwaukee (album) =

Studio album by Elliott Murphy
- Released: 1985
- Genre: Rock
- Label: New Rose
- Producer: Jerry Harrison

Elliott Murphy chronology
Party Girls / Broken Poets (1984)	Milwaukee (1985)	Change Will Come (1987)

Professional ratings
Review scores
Source	Rating
AllMusic	3.5/5 stars

Milwaukee is a studio album by American musician Elliott Murphy, released in 1985 through New Rose Records. It was produced by Talking Heads member Jerry Harrison.

== Track listing ==
All tracks composed by Elliott Murphy.

1. "Taking The Silence"
2. "People Don't Learn"
3. "Out For The Killing"
4. "Sister Real"
5. "Niagara Falls"
6. "Running Around"
7. "Clean It Up"
8. "Texas"
9. "He Who Laughs Last (Laughs Alone)"
10. "Going Through Something (Don't Know What It Is)"

== Personnel ==
- Elliott Murphy - vocals, guitar, harmonica, keyboards
- Art Lbriola - piano, keyboards
- Jesse Chamberlain - drums
- Ernie Brooks - bass
- Jerry Harrison - synthesizer

Technical

- David Vartanian - engineer
