= Joana Preiss =

French actress, director, singer, and performer

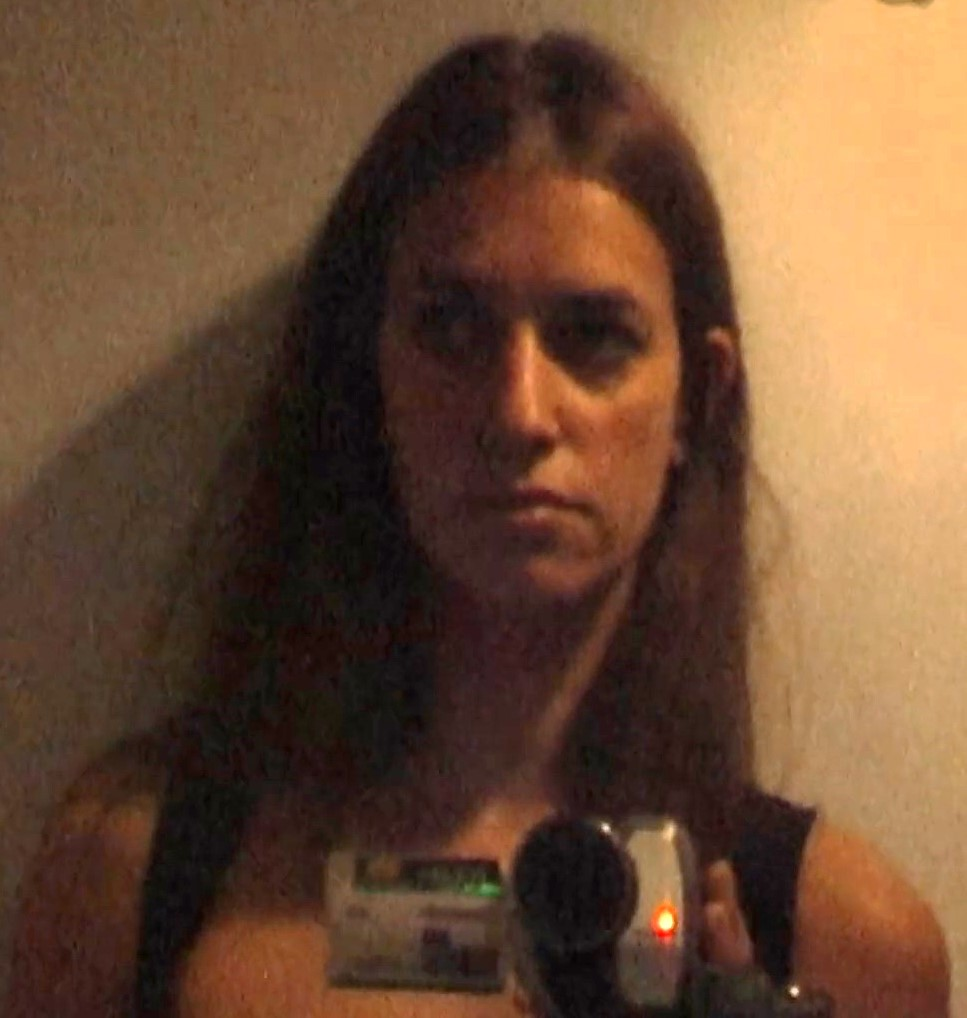
- Preiss in her film, Sibérie, released 2012
- Born: 22 May 1972 (age 53)
- Occupation(s): Actress, filmmaker, singer
- Years active: 1997–present

Joana Preiss (born 22 May 1972) is a French actress, director, singer, and performer.

== Life and career ==
Joana Preiss has starred in the films of Christophe Honoré, Olivier Assayas, Nobuhiro Suwa and Pia Marais, and has also collaborated with Nan Goldin in her works. She has also worked with Ugo Rondinone, Dominique Gonzalez-Foerster and Céleste Boursier-Mougenot. She has performed on stage in the shows of Pascal Rambert and Eleanor Weber.

She was trained in classical singing and contemporary music, and regularly performs in concerts. She founded the duo White Tahina with Vincent Epplay, Hiroyuki, and Frédéric Danos, in which she sings poems by Hölderlin.

In 2011, she directed her first film Sibérie.

== Filmography ==
=== Cinema ===
- 1997 : Fin août, début septembre by Olivier Assayas
- 1999 : La Ballade de l'amour by Nan Goldin
- 2001 : Tout contre Léo by Christophe Honoré
- 2002 : Roundelay by Ugo Rondinone
- 2002 : La Guerre à Paris by Yolande Zauberman
- 2004 : Ma Mère by Christophe Honoré — Réa
- 2004 : Clean by Olivier Assayas – Aline
- 2005 : Un couple parfait by Nobuhiro Suwa
- 2006 : Noise by Olivier Assayas — herself
- 2006 : Dans Paris by Christophe Honoré — Anna
- 2006 : Paris je t'aime by Olivier Assayas
- 2007 : Boarding Gate by Olivier Assayas — Lisa
- 2007 : The Unpolished by Pia Marais
- 2008 : LOL (Laughing Out Loud) by Lisa Azuelos — mother of Stéphane
- 2010 : Complices by Frédéric Mermoud — mother of Rebecca
- 2010 : Kataï (court-métrage) by Claire Doyon
- 2011 : La Ligne blanche by Olivier Torres — Anna
- 2012 : Sibérie by Joana Preiss
- 2012 : Les Mouvements du bassin by HPG
- 2012 : Bad Girl by Patrick Mille — Brigitte
- 2012 : Cino, l'enfant qui traversa la montagne by Carlo Alberto Pinelli] - The shepherdess
- 2012 : Casa dolce casa by Tonino De Bernardi
- 2013 : Hotel de l'Univers de Tonino De Bernardi
- 2013 : Passer l'hiver by Aurélia Barbet
- 2014 : Jour et Nuit — Delle donne e degli uomini perduti de Tonino De Bernardi
- 2014 : Portrait of the Artist by Antoine Barraud
- 2015 : Le Dos rouge by Antoine Barraud — Barbara
- 2016 : Raw by Julia Ducournau
- 2017 : Trilogie de nos vies défaites by Vincent Dieutre
- 2017 : La veillée by Jonathan Millet — Joana
- 2018 : Alien Crystal Palace — Barberey
- 2018 : Broken Poet by Emilio Ruiz Barrachina — Meg

=== Television ===
- 2009 : L'une chante, l'autre aussi by Olivier Nicklaus — herself
