= Yumbo Centrum =

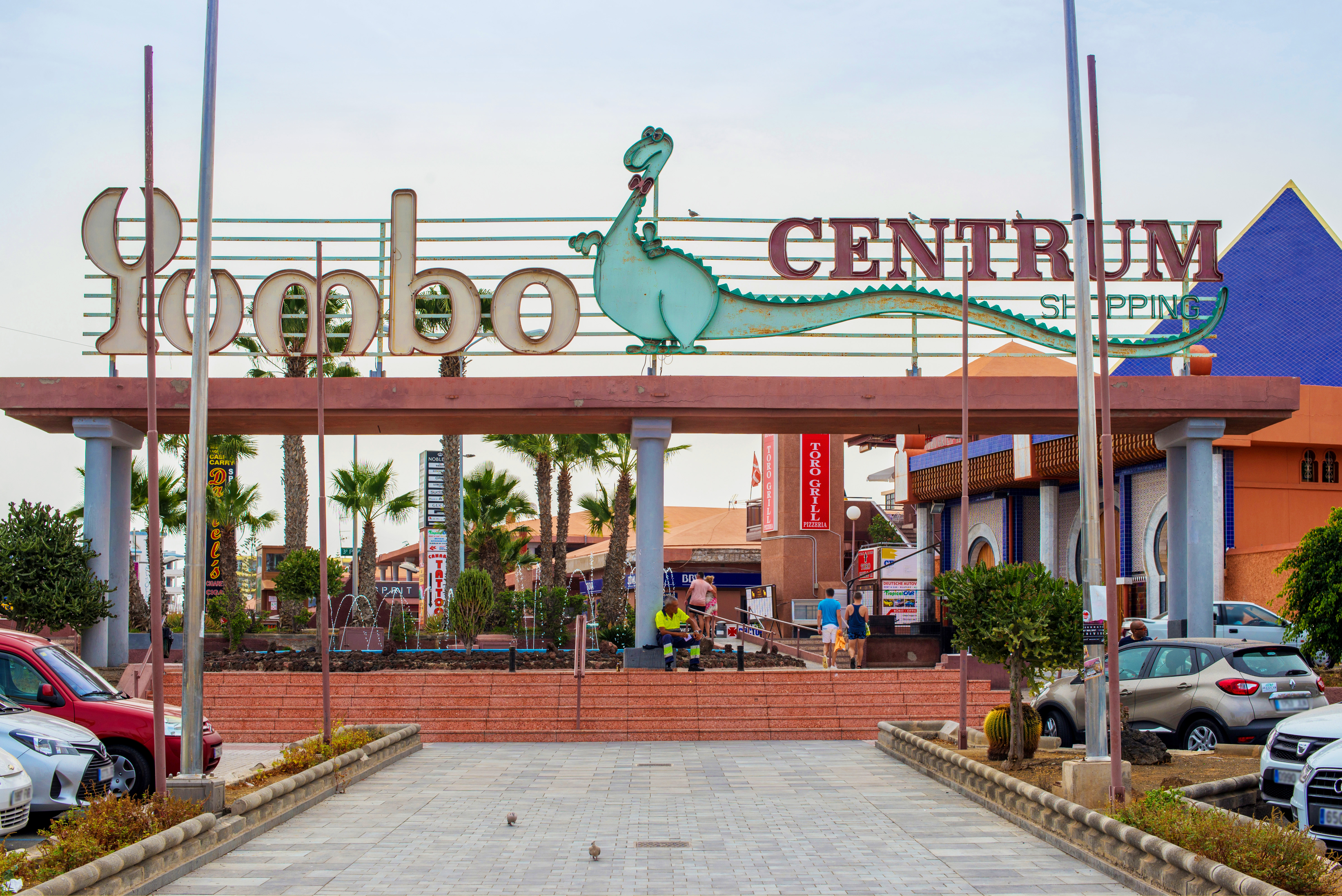
- The entrance to the Yumbo Centrum
- Location: Maspalomas/Playa Del Ingles, Gran Canaria
- Coordinates: 27.7579668°N 15.5773201°W
- Address: Av. Estados Unidos 54, 35100 Maspalomas, Gran Canaria, Spain
- Opened: 1982
- Num. of stores: 200+
- Floor area: 20,000 square metres (220,000 sq ft)
- Floors: 4
- Website: yumbocentrum.com

The Yumbo Centrum (Spanish: El Centro Comercial Yumbo) is a shopping complex on the island of Gran Canaria in the Canary Islands. It is situated in the tourist resort of Playa Del Ingles, between Avenida de Tirajana and Avenida de España.

The centre was built 1982–85 by the tourism entrepreneur Estanislao Mañaricúa Belacortu and Alejandro del Castillo.

== Amenities ==
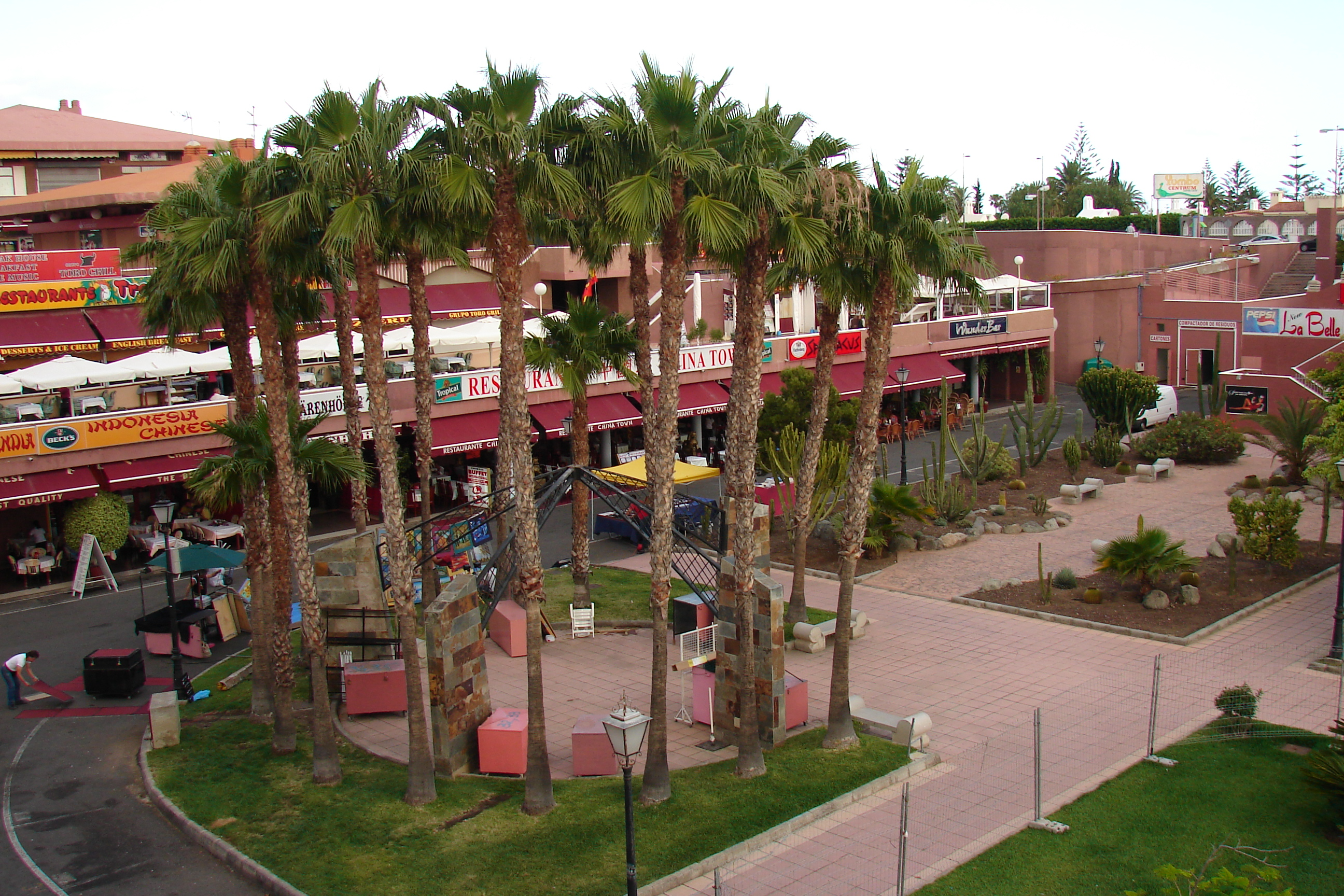
View over the Yumbo Centre terraces

The shopping centre consists of a series of open-air courtyards and terraces. It has over 200 shops and international restaurants situated over multiple floors ranging from clothes, shoes, perfume and jewelry to electronics. Access is at ground level, with retail floors on several levels below ground.

The Yumbo is also noted for its busy nightlife and is a popular attraction for LGBTQIA+ visitors, offering a wide range of gay bars, discos, nightclubs and drag cabarets. The Cabildo insular de Gran Canaria (the island government) operates a tourist information office within the Yumbo Centre, on the ground level by the entrance on Avenida de España.

In May and November the events of the annual summer and winter Gran Canaria Gay Pride celebration are usually centred on the Yumbo Centre, attracting thousands of attendees from around the world. Yumbo also plays host to various gay kink and fetish events particularly focusing on the rubber, leather and bear communities. In the first week of October each year Maspalomas Fetish Week is primarily based in Yumbo.
