= Weber (journal) =

American literary magazine

- Discipline: Literary journal
- Language: English

Publication details
- History: 1984 to present
- Publisher: Weber State University (United States)
- Frequency: Biannual

Standard abbreviations
- ISO 4: Weber

Indexing
- ISSN: 0891-8899

Links
- Journal homepage

Weber—The Contemporary West (formerly Weber Studies) is a leading American literary magazine, founded in 1984 and based at Weber State University in Ogden, Utah. It focuses on the literature and culture of the American West. Work that has been published in Weber Studies has received commendation by the O. Henry Prize.

The journal awards the O. Marvin Lewis Essay Award, Sherwin W. Howard Poetry Award and Neila C. Seshachari Fiction Award. The journal has featured interviews with notable writer including Barry Lopez, Carlos Fuentes, E. L. Doctorow and Robert Pinsky.

== Notable contributors ==
- Jenny Shank
- Guenther Roth
- Gary Gildner
- Gary LaFontaine
- Robert Dana
- David James Duncan
- Ann Beattie
- Ken Burns
- Ron Carlson
- Jacob Appel
- Terry Tempest Williams
- Ryan Shoemaker

== Masthead ==
- Editor—Michael Wutz
- Associate Editors—Russell Burrows, Victoria Ramirez, Kathryn L. MacKay, Brad Roghaar
- Managing Editors—Elizabeth Dohrer

== See also ==
- List of literary magazines
