= Aquashow =

Studio album by Elliott Murphy
- Released: 1973
- Studio: Record Plant East, New York City
- Genre: Rock
- Length: 37:09
- Label: Polydor
- Producer: Peter K. Siegel

Elliott Murphy chronology
Aquashow (1973)	Lost Generation (1975)

Aquashow is the 1973 debut album by singer-songwriter Elliott Murphy.

== Critical reception ==
Professional ratings
Review scores
Source	Rating
AllMusic	4.5/5 stars
Christgau's Record Guide	A−

The album was reviewed by Paul Nelson in Rolling Stone along with Bruce Springsteen's The Wild, the Innocent and the E Street Shuffle under the headline "He's the Best Dylan since 1968", which earned both artists the "New Dylan" tag. When Aquashow was released on CD in 1988 it was reviewed by Robert Hilburn in the Los Angeles Times under the headline "A Compelling Aquashow", and in 2006, thirty-three years after the original release, the album was called an "Album Classic" in a full-page review in Uncut.

== Track listing ==
All tracks composed by Elliott Murphy

1. "Last of The Rock Stars"
2. "How's The Family"
3. "Hangin' Out"
4. "Hometown"
5. "Graveyard Scrapbook"
6. "Poise 'N Pen"
7. "Marilyn"
8. "White Middle Class Blues"
9. "Like a Great Gatsby" (listed as "Like a Crystal Microphone" in the US edition to avoid violating copyrights on the novel)
10. "Don't Go Away"

== Personnel ==
- Elliott Murphy – vocals, guitar, harmonica, piano, backing vocals
- Gene Parsons – drums, backing vocals
- Tasha Thomas – backing vocals
- Dennis Ferrante – backing vocals
- Teddy Irwin – acoustic guitar
- Jim Mason – backing vocals
- Eddie Mottau – backing vocals
- Linda November – backing vocals
- Frank Owens – piano, organ
- Pat Rebillot – piano and organ on "Hangin' Out", "Marilyn" and "Like a Crystal Microphone"
- Maeretha Stewart – backing vocals
- Dick Wagner – backing vocals
- Matthew Murphy – bass, backing vocals
- Rick Marotta – drums on "How's The Family"

Technical

- Shelly Yakus – recording engineer
- Ed Sprigg, Rod O'Brien – tape operator
- Paula Bisacca – artwork
- Jack Mitchell – photography
