= Elliott Murphy =

American singer-songwriter (born 1949)

Elliott Murphy Ordre des Arts et des Lettres
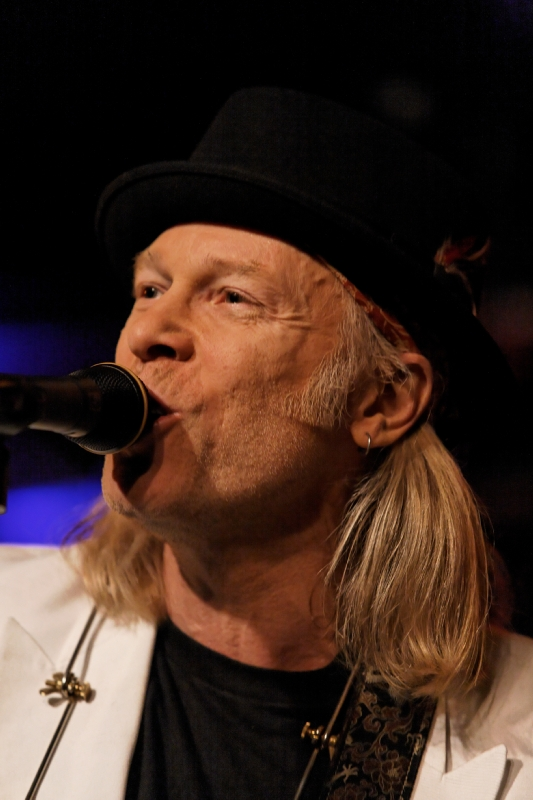
- Murphy in 2007

Background information
- Born: Elliott James Murphy, Jr. March 16, 1949 (age 77); Rockville Centre, New York, U.S.
- Genres: Rock
- Occupations: Singer; songwriter; novelist; journalist
- Years active: 1973–present
- Website: Elliott Murphy Official Website

Elliott James Murphy (born March 16, 1949) is an American rock singer-songwriter, novelist, record producer, and journalist.

== Biography ==
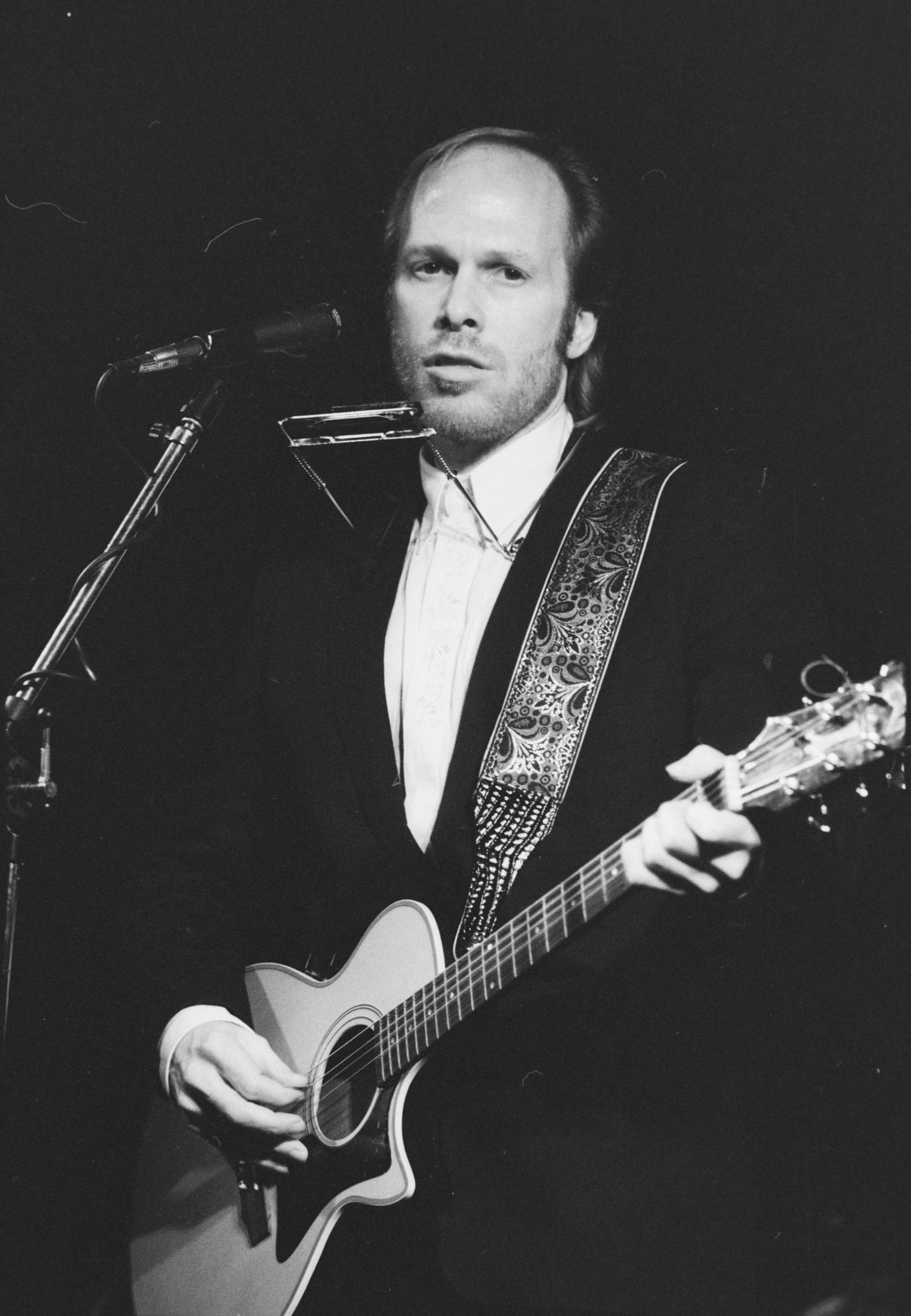
Murphy in 1989

Elliott Murphy was born in Rockville Centre, New York, grew up in Garden City, Long Island and began playing the guitar at age twelve. His band The Rapscallions won the 1966 New York State Battle of the Bands. In 1971 he travelled to Europe and appeared in the Federico Fellini film Roma Returning to New York, in 1973 he secured a record contract with Polydor Records after being noticed by rock critic Paul Nelson. In 1988, he returned to college studies he had given up in the 1960s, and completed his bachelor's degree at Empire State College.

His debut album Aquashow (1973) was critically acclaimed and favorably reviewed in Rolling Stone, Newsweek and The New Yorker. Follow up albums included Lost Generation (1975) produced by Doors Producer Paul A. Rothchild, Night Lights (1975) and Just a Story from America (1977). Special guests on Murphy's albums have included Bruce Springsteen, Mick Taylor, Billy Joel, Phil Collins, Sonny Landreth, David Johansen, Gene Parsons, The Violent Femmes, Cindy Bullens and Shawn Colvin. To date, he has released over thirty-five albums including, Affairs (1980), Murph the Surf (1982). In 1985 Jerry Harrison of Talking Heads produced the album Milwaukee. Selling the Gold (1995) featured a duet, "Everything I Do", with Bruce Springsteen. The album also has a collaboration with the Violent Femmes: all three original members Gordon Gano, Victor DeLorenzo, Brian Ritchie appear on the track "King of the Serpentine".

The albums Beauregard, Rainy Season, Soul Surfing, and La terre commune, a duo with Iain Matthews, followed. Never Say Never...The Best of 1995–2005, a CD and DVD of performances was released in 2005. The year ended with Murphy Gets Muddy, an album of 9 classic blues covers and 5 Murphy blues originals. In early 2007 the album Coming Home Again was released in Europe. Murphy's 30th studio album, Notes from the Underground, came out in 2008 and he returned to the United States. A live CD/DVD-set "Alive in Paris" was released in the fall 2009 followed by the self-titled "Elliott Murphy" (2010), "Just A Story from New York" (2011) and "It Takes A Worried Man" which was produced by his son Gaspard Murphy. All Music Guide has rated over fifteen of his albums with 4 stars or more

In addition to his music and song lyrics Murphy has written for Rolling Stone, Spin, Mucchio Selvaggio, Jam and various European magazines and has published Cold & Electric, a semi-autobiographical novel, in French, German and Spanish editions, as well as two short story collections (The Lion Sleeps Tonight and Where the Women Are Naked and the Men Are Rich) and in 2003 Café Notes (Hachette, France). In 2012 the complete version of Cold & Electric re-titled "Marty May" was published by Joelle Losfeld/Gallimard.

On October 1, 2012, Elliott Murphy was awarded the Médaille de Vermeil de la Ville de Paris in a ceremony at the Hôtel de Ville presided by Paris Mayor Bertrand Delanoë for recognition of his career as a musician and author.

On November 4, 2015 Elliott Murphy was decorated with the Chevalier Ordre des Arts et des Lettres in a ceremony at the Mairie of the 4th Arrondissement in Paris.

In 2018 he was inducted into the Long Island Music Hall of Fame by Billy Joel

A biography of Elliott Murphy, "Hardcore", written by Charles Pitter, was published in 2013.

=== The Second Act of Elliott Murphy ===
In 2015, the documentary film, The Second Act of Elliott Murphy, by Spanish director Jorge Arenillas, detailing the transition of Murphy's career from the US to Europe was released on Mirabal Films. The film won the Audience Prize award at the 2016 Dock of the Bay film festival in San Sebastian, Spain and included interviews with both Bruce Springsteen and Billy Joel.

=== Broken Poet ===
In 2018, Elliott Murphy starred in the film, Broken Poet, by Spanish director Emilio Ruiz Barrachina, adapted from the Elliott Murphy short-story The Lion Sleeps Tonight. Also starring in the film are Marisa Berenson, Michael O'Keefe, Joana Preiss and a cameo appearance by Bruce Springsteen and Patti Scialfa.

== Discography and books ==
=== Albums and EPs ===
- Aquashow (1973)
- Lost Generation (1975)
- Night Lights (1976)
- Just A Story From America (1977)
- Affairs (1980)
- Murph the Surf (1982)
- Party Girls / Broken Poets (1984)
- Milwaukee (1985)
- Change Will Come (1987)
- Après le Déluge (1987)
- If Poets Were Kings (1991)
- 12 (1990) US re-edition: Unreal City (1993)
- Selling the Gold (1995)
- Beauregard (1998)
- Rainy Season (2000)
- La terre commune with Iain Matthews (2001)
- Soul Surfing (2002)
- Soul Surfing – the Next Wave EP (2002)
- Strings of the Storm (2003)
- Murphy Gets Muddy CD/DVD (2005)
- Coming Home Again (2007)
- Notes from the Underground (2008)
- Elliott Murphy (2011)
- It Takes A Worried Man (2013)
- Intime (2014)
- Aquashow Deconstructed (2015)
- Prodigal Son (2017)
- Ricochet (2019)
- The Middle Kingdom (2020)
- Wonder (2022)
- Infinity (2025)

=== Vintage Series ===
- 1 Aquashow & Just A Story From America Demos
- 2 The Night Lights Band Live
- 3 Hello Long Island 1974
- 4 The Murphys
- 5 Gramercy Park
- 6 Electric Murphyland
- 7 Double E
- 8 Live In Texas DVD
- 9 The Paris Concerts: Eldorado 1981 Like Boats Against the Current
- 10 Gold Demos

=== Compilation albums ===
- Diamonds by the Yard (1991)
- Paris/New York (1992)
- Going Through Something – the Best of 1982–1991 (1996)
- Never Say Never – the Best of 1995–2003 & Live DVD (2005)

=== Live albums ===
- Live Hot Point (1991)
- April – a Live Album (1999)
- The Last of the Rock Stars... and Me and You (2001)
- Alive in Paris (2009)
- Just A Story From New York (2011)
- Just for One Day (2011)
- Elliott Murphy is Alive! (2018)
- Live in Bilbao (2021)

=== Film Soundtrack albums ===
- Broken Poet (2020)

=== Misc albums ===
- Poetic Justice (2015)

=== Books ===
- Cold and Electric (Frío y eléctrico, Madrid, 1989, Ediciones Clips). Paris: L'Entreligne, 1989. ISBN 84-8211-057-8
- Where the Women Are Naked and the Men Are Rich (Donde Las Mujeres Estan Desnudas Y Los Hombres Son Ricos). Madrid: Celeste Ediciones, 1996. ISBN 978-84-8211-057-8
- The Lion Sleeps Tonight (El león duerme esta noche, Barcelona, 1990, Ed. Stultilfera Navis)
- Café Notes Hachette (2002) ISBN 9782012356207
- Note al caffé. Italy: FBE Edizioni, 2004. 2004. ISBN 88-89160-01-2
- Poetic Justice. Paris: Hachette Littératures, 2005. ISBN 2-012-35764-4
- Il mio nome e John Little. Italy: FBE Edizioni, 2005. 2007. ISBN 978-88-89160-32-9
- Poetic Justice. Elliott Murphy Books, 2012. ISBN 978-0615669090
- Marty May. Joelle Losefeld/Gallimard, 2013. ISBN 978-2072483455
- Forty Poems in Forty Nights. Elliott Murphy Books, 2016. ISBN 978-1530179084
- Paris Stories. Elliott Murphy Books, 2016. ISBN 978-1539817321
- Tramps. Murphyland Books, 2018. ISBN 978-1541380578
- Diamonds by the Yard. Murphyland Books, 2019. ISBN 978-1985817739
- Just a story from America - A memoir. Murphyland Books. 2019. ISBN 978-1097173877

=== Novels ===
- Poetic Justice. New York: Elliott Murphy Books, 2012. ISBN 978-0-6156-6909-0
