= List of Employee of the Month episodes =

Employee of the Month is a talk show about dreamy careers. The host, Catie Lazarus, gives each guest the Employee of the Month Award. Each installment features guests with jobs of interest, ranging from television personalities and musicians to comedians and puppeteers.

== Episodes ==
=== 2011 ===
No.	Guest(s)	Running time (hours:minutes)	Original release date
1	Julia Bacha	0:21	October 31, 2011
Documentary filmmaker Bacha discusses making it her life's work to save the world.
2	Rachel Dratch	0:14	December 1, 2011
Lazarus interviews comedian and actress Rachel Dratch.
3	Joey Mazzarino	0:22	December 1, 2011
The head writer of Sesame Street breaks down writing for kiddos.
4	Steven Wright	0:33	December 6, 2011
The one and only Oscar award-winning comedian.
5	Jose Rivera	1:06	December 14, 2011
The playwright and director dishes about his family, Hollywood, and writing what matters.
6	Kevin Clash & Elmo!	0:24	December 14, 2011
The puppeteer and puppet share their tricks of the trade on and off Sesame Street.
7	Aurelia Thierree	0:11	December 14, 2011
Thierree discusses her shows Oratorio and Murmurs.

=== 2012 ===
No.	Guest	Running time (hours:minutes)	Original release date
8	Bob Mankoff	0:21	February 7, 2012
The Cartoon Editor for The New Yorker, on rejection, redemption, and the Cartoon Caption Contest.
9	Ashrita Furman	0:20	February 7, 2012
The Guinness Book of World Record Holder for Most Guinness Book of World Records.
10	Brian Lehrer	0:30	February 21, 2012
Catie Lazarus sits down with the host of The Brian Lehrer Show on WNYC and BrianLehrerTV.com on CUNY, none other than Mr. George Michael.
11	The Yes Men	0:23	March 6, 2012
The group reveals the difference between performance art and activism.
12	Paul Marcarelli	0:25	April 26, 2012
Marcarelli, best known as The Verizon Guy, finds a second calling as a director.
13	Sloane Crosley	0:21	April 26, 2012
Lazarus interviews essayist and author Sloane Crosley.
14	Aasif Mandvi	0:11	May 9, 2012
How Aasif Mandvi (The Senior Muslim Correspondent on The Daily Show) feels about being typecast as a Native-American Lesbian nosy neighbor type in Hollywood.
15	Aasif Mandvi, Part II	1:06	May 9, 2012
A continuation of Lazarus' interview with Mandvi.
16	Baratunde Thurston	0:25	June 6, 2012
Comedian, author and digital guru on his New York Times Best Seller How to Be Black, what it was like for him to grow up as a Native-American lesbian, and why he gets to fly around and hit nightclubs with foreign dignitaries.
17	Stephen Dubner	0:25	June 6, 2012
Lazarus interviews the author of Freakanomics.
18	Kambri Crews	0:24	June 6, 2012
Crews on shaking up the comedy scene, storytelling, and working with folks in the deaf community and those with loved ones who are incarcerated.
19	Anya Kamenetz	0:26	June 6, 2012
Lazarus talks to author Kamenetz.
20	Dave Hill	0:45	July 5, 2012
The brilliant comedian, author, and musician, about writing Tasteful Nudes.
21	Jodi Kantor	0:50	August 9, 2012
Kantor speaks about her experience as author of The Obamas and being The New York Times Washington Correspondent.
22	Alex Borstein	0:50	August 13, 2012
Borstein discusses her acting on Family Guy and her writing for various TV series.
23	Dan Curry	1:08	September 26, 2012
Curry shares his insights about writing for print, appearing on This American Life, winning a game show with his wife, comedian Margot Leitman, and writing original characters, sketches and stories for such distinct mediums.
24	Reggie Watts	1:10	September 30, 2012
Watts discusses his solo performances and his work on Comedy Bang Bang.
25	Jon Robin Baitz	0:31	October 17, 2012
Baitz reads one of his latest works aloud, a 10-minute play for a benefit for Playwrights Horizons.
26	Kurt Andersen	0:22	October 18, 2012
Andersen talks about his novel True Believers and being fired from New York Magazine.
27	Myq Kaplan	0:51	November 1, 2012
Kaplan talks about his career taking off and his latest comedy album.
28	Carmen Rubin	1:02	November 29, 2012
Author Rubin discusses writing for children.
29	A. J. Jacobs	0:52	December 7, 2012
The editor of Esquire discusses his career.

=== 2013 ===
No.	Guest(s)	Running time (hours:minutes)	Original release date
30	Chris Henchy	0:35	January 6, 2013
Producer Henchy talks about working on Funny or Die, Entourage, and more.
31	Greg Garcia	0:58	January 6, 2013
The creator of Raising Hope and My Name Is Earl talks breaking into television.
32	Lauren Iungerich	1:05	January 7, 2013
Iungerich discusses how she managed to break into the biz and make accessible, acclaimed work without selling her soul.
33	Gloria Steinem	0:36	January 15, 2013
Steinem speaks on issues including, sex and race caste systems, child abuse, non-violent conflict resolution, and community organization, and her work on Road to the Heart: America As if Everyone Mattered, a book about her more than thirty years on the road as a feminist organizer.
33	Hari Kunzru	0:33	January 15, 2013
Novelist Kunzru discusses his career.
34	Rachel Maddow	0:40	January 16, 2013
Political talk show host Maddow talks about her career and mixes drinks.
35	David Wain	0:19	January 17, 2013
Wain discusses directing Wet Hot American Summer, working with Amy Poehler and Paul Rudd, and what's next for him.
36	Paul Dinello	0:19	January 21, 2013
Dinello speaks about his career in comedy.
37	Adam Rapp	0:28	February 11, 2013
Playwright Rapp talks about his upcoming Broadway debut.
38	David Carr	0:26	February 11, 2013
Carr talks about his career as a journalist.
39	W. Kamau Bell	0:13	February 11, 2013
Bell talks about comedy and his show Totally Biased.
40	Samantha Hahn	1:01	March 10, 2013
Hahn discusses her career as an illustrator and her book Well-Read Women.
41	Neal Medlyn	0:42	March 11, 2013
Medlyn discusses downtown theater and the use of music in his performances.
42	Gina Gershon	0:41	March 17, 2013
Gershon speaks about her acting career, the pain of writing and expertise at procrastinating, as well as her delightful memoir In Search of Cleo: How I Found My Pussy and Lost My Mind.
43	Andrea Syrtash	0:56	March 21, 2013
Syrtash talks about the ethics of being an expert, therapist, brand ambassadors, and product placement.
44	Mike White	0:51	April 1, 2013
Mike White discusses his career as a writer, actor, and director.
45	Neal Medlyn	0:14	April 2, 2013
Medlyn returns to Employee of the Month.
50	Michael Gottwald	0:23	April 2, 2013
Gottwald distills the myths of what it takes to raise money, stump for political campaigns, and discover the youngest Oscar nominated actress in Oscar history, Ms. Quvenzhané Wallis.
51	Alex Karpovsky	0:19	April 2, 2013
Karpovsky discusses his roles in Girls and Inside Llewyn Davis.
52	Ophira Eisenberg	0:51	April 2, 2013
Comedian Eisenberg talks about her career.
53	Common Rotation's Employee of the Month Theme Song	0:04	April 2, 2013
Folk band Common Rotation premieres their theme song for Employee of the Month.
54	Michael Gottwald	0:30	April 15, 2013
Gottwald returns to discuss Beasts of the Southern Wild.
55	Dick Cavett	1:02	April 22, 2013
Cavett discusses the art of talk show hosting.
56	Bobby Cannavale	1:05	April 22, 2013
The Academy Award-winning actor discusses his roles in Boardwalk Empire and Woody Allen's new film Blue Jasmine.
57	Lesley Stahl	0:40	May 6, 2013
Stahl speaks candidly about finances, sexism, and her pithy interviews with, amongst others, Ariel Sharon, Nicolas Sarkozy, Jerry Falwell, and, Boy George.
58	Mike Sacks	1:15	May 15, 2013
Sacks discusses everything from career suicide, imaginary friends, submitting to The New Yorker, growing up in DC, figuring out when you're funny, and the secrets of success.
59	Allison Silverman	0:22	May 17, 2013
Andersen talks about his novel True Believers and being fired from New York Magazine.
60	Emily Bazelon	0:49	May 20, 2013
Bazelon, Slate senior editor discusses her book, Sticks and Stones: Defeating the Culture of Bullying and Rediscovering the Power of Empathy and Character.
61	Buck Henry, Allison Silverman, & Common Rotation	0:50	May 27, 2013
Silverman discusses writing comedy.
62	James Braly	1:01	June 7, 2013
The two-time winner of The Moth GrandSlam talks storytelling.
63	Damian Kulash, Bill Plympton, Bridget Everett, Julie Klausner, & Shockwave	1:08	June 12, 2013
The lead singer of OK Go, cartoonist, comedian, author, and beatboxer sit down with Catie Lazarus.
64	Jimmy Dore	0:36	June 23, 2013
Dore discusses Ronald Reagan, Jay Leno, and more.
65	Bob Harris	0:56	June 26, 2013
Harris talks about pursuing his dreams and helping others pursue theirs.
66	Cathy Ladman	0:53	July 10, 2013
The actress discusses her roles on Mad Men and Curb Your Enthusiasm, and her nine appearances on The Tonight Show.
67	Sara Benincasa	0:35	July 23, 2013
Benincasa discusses her career in comedy and her memoir.
68	Henry Rollins	0:57	July 23, 2013
Lazarus interviews actor and lead singer of Black Flag Henry Rollins.
69	Gail Collins	0:36	August 3, 2013
The New York Times columnist talks about her career.
70	Joy Behar, Stacy London, Janeane Garofalo, & Emily Nussbaum	1:11	August 6, 2013
Catie Lazarus honors and interviews Behar, London, Garofalo, and Nussbaum.
71	Emily Nussbaum	0:17	August 20, 2013
The television critic for The New Yorker discusses her career.
72	Janeane Garofalo	0:16	August 20, 2013
Garofalo admits why she'd like to work in a bead store and referee Animal Planet's Puppy Bowl one day.
72	Stacy London	0:14	August 25, 2013
Lazarus interviews stylist Stacy London.
73	Adam Busch	0:25	August 25, 2013
Busch talks about therapy, angst, narcissism, fear of success and fear of failure, and the joy and self indulgence of show biz.
74	Joy Behar	0:16	August 28, 2013
Behar, consistently candid, discusses developing her play about first husbands.
75	Danny Strong	0:57	September 3, 2013
Strong talks about how he can now choose his acting jobs, because he earns his living writing screenplays. He chronicles his journey from Buffy to Gilmore Girls to Mad Men and competing with actor Samm Levine.
76	Ryan Schreiber	0:50	September 8, 2013
Schreiber on the creation of Pitchfork, a webzine by and for indie music lovers.
77	Ann Carr	0:54	September 11, 2013
Ann Carr, who has appeared on the Emmy Award-winning show Louie, talks about what it's like to audition.
78	Kathryn Minshew	0:32	September 30, 2013
Minshew answers what it's like to run a tech-start up, how to raise millions of dollars in venture capital funds, and what happens if it flops.
79	Insult Comic Dog	0:11	October 2, 2013
Triumph poops on Brooklyn hipsters, podcasts, and reveals that Red Hook is named after his shvance.
80	Robert Smigel	0:31	October 7, 2013
The comedy writer discusses his career and his iconic characters.
81	Lin-Manuel Miranda	0:21	October 10, 2013
Miranda talks writing robocalls, chatting with Stephen Sondheim, and having his own bodyguard.
82	Mo Rocca	0:21	October 11, 2013
Humorist Rocca discusses his career.
83	Insult Comic Dog, Lin-Manuel Miranda, Mo Rocca, & Lady Rizo	1:40	October 18, 2013
Lazarus sits down with Triumph the Insult Comic Dog, Lin-Manuel Miranda, Mo Rocca, and Lady Rizo.
84	Lady Rizo	0:40	October 20, 2013
Rizo speaks about how she is reinventing the wheel, how she pays homage to the late great starlets like Peggy Lee and Nina Simone and collaborates with pop culture icons.
84	Ted Travelstead	0:43	October 21, 2013
Travelstead discusses his career from Children of the Corn II to making videos on Vine.
85	Jess Wood	0:55	October 29, 2013
Wood talks about her writing a memoir about growing up in gang infested Hollywood, working as a tween prostitute, non-prescription drug distribution, starting over, and her mentors Richard Pryor and Mae West.
86	Lynn Chen	0:23	October 31, 2013
Chen discusses acting, making music, and blogging.
87	Moe & Mary	0:37	October 31, 2013
Moe and Mary discuss what it takes to be successful commercial actors.
88	Margot Leitman	0:34	November 3, 2013
Leitman talks about why storytelling rocks, stand up blows, how to quit a temp job, and win money (and a Prius) instead.
89	Anna Holmes	0:45	November 8, 2013
Homles speaks about how it became nearly impossible to make a living as freelancer; her dream internship at Entertainment Weekly; differences between being an editor and writer; job burnout; and how your voice changes depending on the outlet.
89	Stephen Moyer	0:18	November 20, 2013
Moyer discusses why he was the only one chosen to direct an episode of True Blood.
90	Chris Gethard	0:19	November 22, 2013
Gethard speaks about how the love of performing is the only reason to do it; inevitably of rejection in show biz; dreamy day job; and, of course, STD's.
91	Amy Sherman-Palladino	0:19	November 26, 2013
Sherman-Palladino reveals her self-awareness and admits her aversion to coddling and mentoring.
92	Diane Birch	0:26	December 3, 2013
Birch explains how the music industry has standard story lines for musicians, performing for Prince, growing up Goth, and playing a piano bar as a day job. She also performs live, including a song from her album Speak A Little Louder, with her band and drummer and partner-in-crime Homer Steinweiss.
93	Anthony De Rosa	0:42	December 9, 2013
De Rosa discusses transforming how we consume news.
94	Memo to Fans	0:03	December 13, 2013
Lazarus announces two live tapings over the 2013 holidays.

=== 2014 ===
No.	Guest(s)	Running time (hours:minutes)	Original release date
95	Elliott Kalan	1:09	January 7, 2014
Kalan speaks about being the Head Writer of The Daily Show with Jon Stewart and being the recipient of multiple Emmy Awards.
96	Maria Popova	0:46	January 7, 2014
Popova discusses Brainpickings.org and her interest in creativity, psychology, literature, language, science, design, and philosophy.
97	Kathleen Hanna, Piper Kerman, Jon Ronson, & Maria Dizzia	0:54	January 18, 2014
Lazarus speaks with Kathleen Hanna, Piper Kerman, Jon Ronson, and Maria Dizzia.
98	J. R. Havlan	0:48	January 22, 2014
Havlan reveals what it really takes to make a career as a comedy writer; what a warm-up comic stomachs; just how different it is to write for Bill Maher and Jon Stewart; how to survive pilot season; and the joy of taking your dog to work.
99	Kathleen Hanna	0:14	January 29, 2014
Journalist, actress, memoirist, and punk singer Kathleen Hanna discusses her career.
100	Jon Ronson	0:11	January 29, 2014
Ronson talks about the corrosive effects of diagnosing strangers and how reality TV shows, filmmakers and journalists can often oversimplify their subjects and almost fetishize extreme qualities. Ronson reveals how much he worships celebrities and hangs out on George Clooney's fan sites.
101	Piper Kerman	0:12	January 30, 2014
Kerman, the author of the memoir that inspired the Netflix series Orange Is the New Black discusses her dream job and prison reform.
102	Homer Steinweiss	0:32	February 7, 2014
Steinweiss discusses what life on the road is really like; his uniquely artistic family; collaborating and negotiating various personalities; cover art; addiction; and what it actually means to be a music producer.
103	Lewis Black	0:32	February 10, 2014
Black explains how stand up is what pays his bills.
104	Jad Abumrad	0:18	February 19, 2014
Abumrad breaks down how Radiolab is edited, and what a MacArthur Genius Grant is worth.
105	Daryl Roth	0:14	February 22, 2014
Roth discusses her transition from interior decorator to theater producer.
106	Nellie McKay	0:19	February 22, 2014
McKay talks about how she has used her fame to raise awareness about animal rights and why she delivers so much good, on stage and off.
107	Seth Godin	0:20	March 12, 2014
The entrepreneur, speaker, and author discusses his career.
108	Esther Perel	0:16	March 12, 2014
Perel addresses our universal challenges, joys, frustrations, and hunger for love, sexual freedom, and connection.
109	Cindy Chupack	0:42	March 12, 2014
Chupack speaks candidly about the joy and stress of writing for TV, fitting in on a show, creating your own show, and trying to stay connected to friends and family.
110	Andrew Rannells	0:23	March 14, 2014
Rannells discusses his comedy chops in musical theater, and how his early turns in Hedwig, Avenue Q, Jersey Boys, and, of course, Pokémon Live! prepared Rannells for the rigors of performing six to eight shows a week.
111	Danny Burstein	0:18	March 16, 2014
Burstein discusses his career as a character actor.
112	Seth Godin	0:20	March 25, 2014
The entrepreneur, speaker, and author discusses his career.
113	Scott Bateman	0:28	March 26, 2014
Bateman reveals his tricks of the trade and encourages others to have fun and give game shows a whirl if you want to find money quickly.
114	Rebecca Soffer	0:45	April 7, 2014
How Soffer balances (new) motherhood and a new website.
115	Jill Abramson	0:30	April 14, 2014
Abramson's last interview before being fired as Executive Editor of the New York Times.
116	Adira Amram	0:32	May 8, 2014
Amram reveals how growing up in a family of artists propelled her to want to stand out.
117	Wallace Shawn	0:38	May 8, 2014
Shawn offers a small glimpse of how challenging it is to write for the stage and (hope) actors understand what you meant, and then deliver accordingly.
118	Barney Frank	0:32	May 20, 2014
Frank speaks about his experience, work habits, C-Span's gluttony, and why he thinks Dick Cheney is a liar.
119	Rosie Perez	0:28	May 24, 2014
Perez discusses choreography, working with Jennifer Lopez and Bobby Brown, and acting.
120	Dave Attell	0:39	June 6, 2014
Attell explains why working at The Daily Show wasn't the best fit, what he enjoyed about his critically acclaimed series Insomniac, and why he proudly supports Operation Purple.
121	Taylor Mac	0:29	June 7, 2014
Taylor, who goes by Judy, talks about s****y day jobs, the joys of collaborating, and the weird nature auditioning.
122	Paula Pell	0:29	June 18, 2014
Pell describes how challenging the process was of getting her film off the ground, even with the biggest box office stars in comedy. She also talks about her awkward first interview with Lorne Michaels, starting out at Disney's Fantasy Island, and her deep and abiding love for animals, be it pet pigs or rats.
123	Josh Tupper of Russ & Daughters	0:23	July 4, 2014
Tupper shares his insights into what it's like to take on such a personally meaningful work and add his own mark to its legacy.
124	Sheila Nevins	0:25	July 10, 2014
Nevins speaks about her acting stints; what sorts of films HBO green lights, and whether it's better as a woman to Lean In or Lean Back.
125	Martha Plimpton	0:23	July 28, 2014
Plimpton discusses her long and varied career in acting.
126	Matt Zoller Seitz	0:16	July 29, 2014
Lazarus interviews New York Magazine's film and television critic.
127	Josh Charles	0:24	August 13, 2014
Charles meditates on how grueling acting can be and his experience getting snatched up by a manager at the sleepaway camp, Stagedoor Manor.
128	David Berkeley	0:20	August 24, 2014
Berkeley speaks about the dangers of playing Cyrano, difficulty in turning down gigs, and the joys of living in New Mexico.
129	James Monroe Iglehart	0:20	August 25, 2014
Iglehart freestyles and talks about winning his Tony and Drama Desk Awards for his role of the Genie in Disney's Aladdin.
130	Al Jaffee	0:34	October 7, 2014
Jaffee talks about why he isn't concerned about deserving credit for his work, how he comes up with ideas, and why life isn't fair.
131	Tom Colicchio	0:36	October 14, 2014
Colicchio offers genuine insight into everything from tipping to why kale is so hot.
132	Simon Rich	0:15	October 22, 2014
Simon Rich talks about SNL, The New Yorker, and publishing his own newspaper.
133	Alex Borstein	0:24	November 5, 2014
Borstein reveals how success in one arena begets success in another and what enabled her to realize she enjoyed acting in meaty fare.
134	Ilana Glazer & Abbi Jacobson	0:27	November 12, 2014
Glazer and Jacobson talk about meeting in their early twenties and how they began writing together.
135	Wesley Morris	0:21	November 13, 2014
Pulitzer-winning film critic Morris discusses breaking in and who really runs the media.
136	Anthony Bregman	0:21	November 19, 2014
The producer of Foxcatcher talks raising equity and investing in indie films.
137	Al Jaffee	0:35	November 28, 2014
Jaffee shares his insight into how illustrators, writers, and cartoonists created a field that didn't exist and reveals why Jews changed their names when hustling for gigs pre-World War II to what it was like to work with Stan Lee pre-Marvel.
138	Stephin Merritt	0:21	December 4, 2014
Stephen Merritt of The Magnetic Fields discusses film school, touring, and Scrabble.
139	Joshua Wolf Shenk	0:34	December 12, 2014
Shenk explains why dyads are so potent in his book, Powers of Two: Seeking the Essence of Innovation in Creative Pairs and looks at his own creative partnerships.
140	Taylor Schilling & Piper Kerman	0:35	December 23, 2014
Schilling and Kerman discuss the experience of prison and casting a genuinely diverse ensemble of formidable actors.
141	Frank Bruni	0:25	December 30, 2014
The New York Times columnist discusses the SAT, Bush vs. Obama, and Ikea meatballs.

=== 2015 ===
No.	Guest(s)	Running time (hours:minutes)	Original release date
142	Kate Innamorato	0:18	January 7, 2015
Innamorato explains why she prefers to use roadkill, scrap skins from other taxidermists, previously frozen feeders, problem animals, and donated skins.
143	Justin Sayre	0:32	January 15, 2015
Sayre sizes up the state of political, social, and culture affairs, namely for the LGBT community.
144	Adam Goldberg & Jeff Garlin	0:55	January 23, 2015
Garlin discloses not only what it's like to work for Goldberg, and what style underwear he wears at home — boxers or briefs.
145	Mel Ottenberg	0:19	February 2, 2015
Ottenberg explains what it's like to work in the fashion industry.
146	Krister Johnson	0:37	February 4, 2015
Johnson speaks about what it really takes to be a TV writer.
147	Kevin Avery	0:39	February 15, 2015
Avery covers what it's really like to "balance" it all as a LA writer who can't stop getting hired in New York.
148	Emily Spivack	0:32	February 16, 2015
Spivack, the author of Worn Stories, discusses digital storytelling.
149	Jon Stewart	0:46	February 21, 2015
Stewart talks about directing Rosewater, leaving the show he made iconic, and being fired from Woolworth by his brother.
150	Martha Wainwright	0:30	February 26, 2015
Wainwright explains how even the most personally intimate songs can be cathartic for audiences.
151	Sherman "OT" Powell	0:24	March 3, 2015
Powell shares his stories from 40 years on the dark side as a pickpocket.
152	Jelly D	0:16	March 11, 2015
Jelly D talks quitting advertising to play music, act, and of course, intern.
153	Syd Butler	0:23	March 24, 2015
Butler talks about life on the road, his roots in the ska scene and work crush on Ian McKay, of Fugazi, in Washington, DC.
154	Liz Tuccillo	0:21	March 27, 2015
Tuccillo's discusses joining the writing staff of Sex-in-the-City and turning one of the episodes into a best selling comedic self-help dating book, He's Just Not The Into You.
155	Cynthia Nixon — Part One	0:40	April 2, 2015
Nixon speaks candidly about what it was like to have her mother direct her, growing up (and now raising children) in New York, recording audio books for V.C. Andrews, and getting roles post Sex-in-the-City.
156	Cynthia Nixon — Part Two	0:43	April 9, 2015
Nixon weights in on how she chooses what she gets involved with, what it means to be an activist, the challenges of breaking into Hollywood, and the hard part of turning down roles.
157	Rosie O'Donnell	0:37	April 27, 2015
O'Donnell talks about breaking into stand up, the reality of "having it all," and what's next after The View, given that she can choose her own adventure.
158	Daniel Friedman	0:32	May 7, 2015
Friedman spoke about breaking into the LGBTQ fashion industry and coming up with fake e-mail addresses to seem more professional.
159	Adrian Martinez	0:31	May 11, 2015
Martinez discusses carving out a niche as a character actor, the late Philip Seymour Hoffman's influence, and the perks of playing a sidekick to box office stars.
160	Cindy Chupack	0:21	May 31, 2015
Chupack speaks about the pressure from scions like Sheryl Sandberg and Arianna Huffington for women to overcompensate, firing versus being fired, and segueing into directing.
161	Olympia Dukakis	0:27	June 4, 2015
Dukakis speaks about the robbery of her Academy Award, and which Look Who's Talking made the most money.
162	Betty Halbreich	0:18	June 9, 2015
Halbreich dispels any myths that fame or success is ever handed to you.
163	Justin Sayre	0:20	June 17, 2015
Sayre speaks about his bitingly funny and shrew monthly show, The Meeting: Order of Sodomites, as well as writing for 2 Broke Girls. He also performs two songs.
164	Nicholas Kristof	0:26	July 2, 2015
Kristof ruminates on his experience growing up on a sheep farm, whether he thinks empathy can be taught, and how major tech brands fail to practice social responsibility.
165	Lee Fields	0:22	July 9, 2015
Fields speaks about spearheading soul alongside Charles Bradley and Sharon Jones. Fields also sings from his latest album Faithful Man.
166	Anna Chlumsky	0:23	July 12, 2015
Chlumksy talks about making a name for herself with a starring role in the film My Girl, her return to entertainment, and her big break in the television series Veep.
167	Daveed Diggs	0:18	July 19, 2015
Diggs reveals why he hated working at Pier 1, freestyles with Jelly D and Shockwave, and discusses why he had enough drive to take on a starring role in his first Broadway show.
168	Daveed Diggs	0:46	July 21, 2015
Diggs discusses east coast vs. west coast rap vs. regional rap, napping to making sure you don't eat anything that may land you in the loo before curtain call, and why he worships his pop.
169	Eliza Zurisky & Julie Rottenberg	0:31	July 23, 2015
The duo discusses what made working for their boss and Sex and the City show's head writer Michael Patrick King so fulfilling and, unfortunately, rare in TV writing. They also speak about their own failed pilots and what it's like to go from childhood friends into business with one another.
170	Stella Starsky & Quinn Cox	0:17	July 23, 2015
Starsky and Cox satirize metaphysics, and discuss performing their live show, "Cosmic Cabaret," along with their two best selling books.
171	Corn Mo	0:17	July 31, 2015
Corn Mo speaks about why he decided not to be a preacher and, instead, joined a sideshow circus.
172	Hari Kondabolu	0:20	August 6, 2015
Kondabolu discusses his performances on TV shows Late Show with David Letterman, Conan, Jimmy Kimmel Live, Live at Gotham, and John Oliver's New York Standup Show.
173	David Crabb	0:16	August 7, 2015
Crabb speaks about transforming his coming-of-age stories as a gay, goth kid in Texas in the 1980s and 1990s into a live one man touring show and debut memoir.
174	Joshua Katz	0:29	August 19, 2015
Katz discusses the secrecy required for a job in the CIA, how it often wreaks havoc on marriage, and his decision to invite terrorists into his home with his children for dinner.
175	Laila Robins	0:21	August 19, 2015
Robins speaks about what she learned from her Latvian parents and how her illustrious voice-over career funds what she calls her "theater habit."
176	Lisa Kron	0:54	September 1, 2015
Kron discusses writing her first musical Fun Home with composer Jeanine Tesori, what a Tony Award does for your career, and how writing for television may be a necessary way for theater rats to pay the bills.
177	Alex Blumberg	0:55	September 11, 2015
Blumberg speaks about This American Life and what he thinks is crucial to making successful podcasts.
178	Sue Shapiro	0:36	September 21, 2015
Shapiro explains what it means to create boundaries with her students, what it's like to write about her loved ones, and how it feels to read material written about her.
179	Tara Brach	0:26	October 16, 2015
Brach talks meditation and making a living.
180	Candice Wiggins	0:24	October 20, 2015
Wiggins discusses her family and becoming a basketball star.
181	Will Sheff	0:21	October 27, 2015
Lazarus interviews artist, writer, and musician Will Sheff.
182	Irin Carmon	0:49	November 3, 2015
Carmon discusses Ruth Bader Ginsburg and her own life.
183	Katina Corrao	0:34	November 4, 2015
Lazarus interviews stand-up comedian Katina Corrao.
184	Nate Silver	0:32	November 5, 2015
Nate Silver discusses confirmation bias and the upcoming election.
185	Inyang Bassey	0:12	November 16, 2015
Bassey discusses her meteoric rise as a singer.
186	Josh Radnor	0:27	November 16, 2015
Radnor talks acting and meeting the Dalai Lama.
187	Cindy Gallop	0:22	November 16, 2015
Gallop discusses her career as an ad exec and her legendary TEDTalk that launched MakeLoveNotPorn.
188	David Cross	0:40	December 5, 2015
Lazarus interviews comedian David Cross.
189	Billy Crudup	0:31	December 13, 2015
Billy Crudup addresses controversy over his film Spotlight.
190	Tara Brach	0:49	December 22, 2015
Tara Brach discusses mindfulness and caring.
191	Bobby Cannavale	0:29	December 30, 2015
Cannavale talks family, "flow," and Al Pacino.

=== 2016 ===
No.	Guest(s)	Running time (hours:minutes)	Original release date
192	Paola Antonelli	0:23	January 5, 2016
The Senior Design and Architecture Curator at MoMA talks guns, rejection, punk rock, sexism, and smoking.
193	Jason Biggs	0:26	January 13, 2016
Biggs discusses his acting career since middle school.
194	Ada Calhoun	0:47	January 18, 2016
Calhoun talks redefining journalism and her book St. Marks Is Dead.
195	Larry Kramer	0:26	January 26, 2016
Kramer discusses his career as a writer and his AIDS activism.
196	Binky Griptite	0:09	January 27, 2016
Griptite discusses his music and working with Amy Winehouse and Sharon Jones.
197	Sarah Silverman	0:32	February 9, 2016
Silverman talks comedy, Bernie Sanders, and Kramer from Seinfeld.
198	Sharon Van Etten	0:24	February 16, 2016
Van Etten discusses her career switch from food service to music, and sings live.
199	Samantha Power	0:25	February 28, 2016
The Ambassador to the UN talks the GOP, Hillary Clinton, and diplomacy.
200	Michael McKean	0:36	March 2, 2016
Actor McKean discusses taking risks with his career and sings live.
200	Greta Gerwig	0:21	March 9, 2016
Gerwig discusses getting rejected from Yale and her upcoming directorial debut.
201	Emel Mathlouthi	0:12	March 15, 2016
Mathlouthi talks about her singing career, the Tunisian Revolution, and performs live.
202	Tony Roberts	0:18	March 23, 2016
Roberts discusses acting alongside Woody Allen and his new memoir.
203	David Simon	0:38	April 6, 2016
Simon, the creator of TV series The Wire, discusses Edward Snowden, porn, and more.
204	Justin Vivian Bond	0:28	April 13, 2016
Bond talks v's career in performance art.
205	Arthur Lewis	0:49	April 15, 2016
Composer Lewis discusses Lin-Manuel Miranda and balancing art with income.
206	Josh Gondelman	0:23	April 27, 2016
Gondelman talks stand-up and writing for Last Week Tonight with John Oliver.
207	Isaac Mizrahi	0:30	May 4, 2016
Mizrahi talks family and fashion.
208	Julia Cameron	0:21	May 11, 2016
Cameron discusses Martin Scorsese and motivation on the 25th anniversary of her book The Artist's Way.
209	Suzan-Lori Parks	0:25	May 23, 2016
Parks discusses academics, writing for Amazon, and James Baldwin.
210	Jen Marlowe	0:43	May 27, 2016
Lazarus interviews activist Jen Marlowe.
211	Tituss Burgess	0:25	June 3, 2016
Burgess discusses his acting career and his real-life wine company.
212	Jon Hamm	0:36	June 8, 2016
Hamm talks acting, being a team player, and struggling in his twenties.
213	Patti LuPone	0:37	June 15, 2016
LuPone talks sex and show business, and sings live with Tituss Burgess.
214	Maya Rudolph	0:47	October 4, 2016
Rudolph discusses Prince and Oprah, and performs live.
215	Laura Benanti	0:39	October 11, 2016
Benanti discusses her viral impression of Melania Trump and sings live.
216	Isaac Oliver	0:17	October 18, 2016
Author Oliver discusses his debut book, Intimacy Idiot.
217	Jessica Bennett	0:37	October 25, 2016
Bennett discusses her first book and suggestions for women facing sexism.
218	Nate Silver	0:34	October 25, 2016
Silver discusses the 2016 election and what set him apart as a kid.
219	Nate Silver	0:34	November 1, 2016
Silver discusses the 2016 election and what set him apart as a kid.
220	Nick Denton	0:34	November 8, 2016
Denton talks Peter Thiel, the fall of Gawker Media, and his bankruptcy.
221	Mitski	0:17	November 15, 2016
Mitski discusses appearing on The Late Show, her album Puberty 2, and Twitter.
222	Sarah Treem	0:43	November 22, 2016
Treem talks hiring and firing, sex and seduction, and egos and loneliness.
223	Martha Wainwright	0:20	December 7, 2016
Wainwright discusses Leonard Cohen, Glen Hansard, and her album Goodnight City, and sings live.
224	Jon Glaser	0:40	December 14, 2016
Glaser talks about The Second City and whether Saturday Night Live stole his joke.
225	John Turturro	0:46	December 21, 2016
Turturro discusses his acting career and the need to laugh after the 2016 election.
226	Morris Robinson	0:21	December 28, 2016
Robinson discusses his childhood in Atlanta, his time as a college football quarterback, and his career as an opera singer.

=== 2017 ===
No.	Guest	Running time (hours:minutes)	Original release date
227	Sarah Kay	0:25	January 3, 2017
Kay talks about her life on the road and performs live.
228	Phoebe Robinson	0:17	January 10, 2017
Robinson discusses the difficulty of breaking into comedy.
229	J.Period	0:23	January 19, 2017
J.Period discusses working with Lauryn Hill and creating the Hamilton Mixtape.
230	J.Period	0:23	January 26, 2017
In this follow-up interview, producer J. Period discusses what a DJ does and what sets him apart.
231	Suad Amiry	0:29	February 6, 2017
Amiry talks diaspora, dyslexia, dogs, and in-laws.
232	Leslie Goshko	0:46	February 8, 2017
Amiry talks diaspora, dyslexia, dogs, and in-laws.
233	Alan Alda	0:41	February 23, 2017
Alda discusses empathy, dogs, death, and science.
234	Sarah Jones	0:25	March 1, 2017
Jones discusses Meryl Streep, Gil Scott-Heron, and quitting college.
235	Emel Mathlouthi	0:14	March 8, 2017
Mathlouthi talks about hope in the face of struggle, and sings live for International Women's Day.
236	The Yes Men	0:22	March 15, 2017
The Yes Men talk Trump, Barbie, and bird-dogging.
237	Zadie Smith	0:34	March 23, 2017
Novelist Smith talks pot, Prince, plotlessness, and plagiarism.
238	Judy Gold	0:30	March 29, 2017
Gold discusses starting out in stand-up, Holocaust jokes, Louis C.K., and sexism.
239	John Benjamin Hickey	0:45	April 5, 2017
Hickey discusses winning a Tony and reuniting with Allison Janney.
240	Lady Rizo	0:25	April 12, 2017
Lady Rizo talks embezzlement, sex, and her new album Indigo.
241	Oskar Eustis	0:38	April 19, 2017
The artistic director of The Public Theater discusses developing new works all around the world.
242	Cecile Richards	0:33	May 2, 2017
Richards discusses the economics of sexism.
243	Rachel Feinstein	0:46	May 10, 2017
Feinstein talks about starting out in stand-up, breaking into acting, and working with her roommate Amy Schumer.
244	John Roberts	0:46	May 17, 2017
Roberts discusses getting his start on YouTube and his role on Bob's Burgers.
245	Priya Natarajan	0:20	May 24, 2017
Astrophysicist Natarajan talks black holes and Carl Sagan.
246	Adrianne Lenker	0:13	June 2, 2017
Lenker discusses her career as a singer and songwriter, and sings live.
247	Keegan-Michael Key	0:33	June 9, 2017
Key discusses Barack Obama and preparing to be in Hamlet.
248	Edie Falco	0:32	June 14, 2017
Falco discusses her marriage, her off-screen relationship with James Gandolfini, shifting priorities, and the challenges that single parents face.
249	Bradley Whitford	0:42	June 21, 2017
Whitford talks starting out in theater, appearing in Get Out, and his hatred for David Mamet.
250	Shonali Bhowmik	0:46	July 1, 2017
Bhowmik talks growing up Indian in Nashville, leaving Sony, and touring with David Cross.
251	Seth Herzog	0:36	July 12, 2017
Herzog discusses Jimmy Fallon, VH1's Best Week Ever, Wonder Woman, and Mark Rothko.
252	Michael Patrick King	0:37	July 24, 2017
King discusses working with Sarah Jessica Parker, Bridget Everett, and Lisa Kudrow.
253	Kevin McDonald	0:31	July 28, 2017
The Kids in the Hall member McDonald talks Jerry Seinfeld, The Beatles, love, loneliness, and finances.
254	Wayne Federman	0:30	August 2, 2017
Federman discusses working with Garry Shandling, Judd Apatow, and Jimmy Fallon, as well as composing music.
255	Lin-Manuel Miranda	0:18	August 9, 2017
Miranda discusses writing robocalls, chatting with Stephen Sondheim, and having his own bodyguard.
256	Daveed Diggs	0:12	August 16, 2017
Diggs talks about his former day job at Pier One Imports and how he snagged a starring role in Hamilton.
257	Al Jaffee	0:33	August 23, 2017
Mad Magazine's longest running contributor discusses growing up poor in Lithuania during the Holocaust, and breaking into comics.
258	Nicole Holofcener	0:46	September 6, 2017
Holofcener discusses celebrity, money, and being a "female" director in Hollywood.
259	Anna Ziegler	0:45	November 16, 2017
Playwright Ziegler talks Nicole Kidman, Roger Federer, and Broadway.
260	Rebecca Traister	0:49	November 21, 2017
Traister talks about sexism, class, and Jared Kushner destroying The Observer.

=== 2018 ===
No.	Guest(s)	Running time (hours:minutes)	Original release date
262	Martha Plimpton and Masha Gessen	0:38	October 13, 2018
Plimpton and Gessen talk Vladimir Putin, abortion, and modeling.
263	Fred Armisen and Anthony Atamanuik	0:29	October 27, 2018
Armisen explains why dreams are a waste of time, and Atamanuik discusses having empathy for Donald Trump.
264	Christopher Jackson and Celina Su	0:46	November 10, 2018
Jackson discusses originating the role of George Washington in Hamilton, being a lead in In the Heights, and writing music for Sesame Street. Plus, Lazarus sits down in the studio with CUNY professor and poet Celina Su to discuss prose, refugees, and avoiding burnout.
265	Emily Mortimer and Dolly Wells	0:40	November 24, 2018
Mortimer and Wells talk about merkins, The Sex Pistols, and each other. They also offer a sneak peek of what they're working on next.
266	Hannibal Buress and Marina Franklin	1:01	December 8, 2018
Comedians Buress and Franklin discuss consensual sex, Chicago, and stand-up comedy.
267	Jeffrey Wright and Brian Lehrer	0:56	December 15, 2018
Wright and Lehrer talk Brett Kavanaugh, Jack Daniels, and manspreading.
268	Wyatt Cenac and Negin Farsad	0:56	December 22, 2018
Cenac discusses "casual acting," and Farsad talks "blackout boning."
269	Patton Oswalt and Tig Notaro	0:52	December 29, 2018
Oswalt and Notaro discuss getting fired and finding love.

=== 2019 ===
No.	Guest(s)	Running time (hours:minutes)	Original release date
270	Peter Sagal	0:43	January 5, 2019
Sagal discusses his journey from theater to public radio.
271	Ezra Klein and Sasheer Zamata	0:45	January 12, 2019
Klein talks tribalism, fanfiction, and the data on dry humping. Zamata talks writing for animation and Tokyo Disneyland.
272	Catherine Burns and Jo Firestone	0:54	January 19, 2019
The Moth's Catherine Burns discusses grief and Burning Man, and Firestone discusses writing for other comedians (Jimmy Fallon, Joe Pera, and Chris Gethard) as well as for herself.
273	Kevin Allison and Chris "Shockwave" Sullivan	1:08	January 26, 2019
Allison and Sullivan reveal the fun (and not-so-fun) of comedy troupes.
274	Utkarsh Ambudkar and Nisha Ganatra	0:46	February 2, 2019
Ambudkar and Ganatra discuss what has (and hasn't) changed in Hollywood.
275	Reggie Watts	0:37	February 9, 2019
Watts discusses creating in the medium of virtual reality, and how it increases empathy.
276	Lisa Kron and Desiree Akhavan	0:41	February 16, 2019
Kron and Akhavan discuss finding your voice when directing sex scenes, as well as protesting.
277	Nick Hornby	0:52	February 23, 2019
Hornby discusses his new TV project, and how he knows whether his writing is any good.
278	Adrienne Truscott and Alysia Reiner	1:04	March 2, 2019
Truscott reveals what comedians mean by "funny is funny." Reiner discusses her work on Orange Is the New Black and Better Things, as well as her film Egg and motherhood.
279	Aparna Nancherla	0:38	March 9, 2019
Nancherla discusses the solitary nature of stand-up and writing, the toll it takes to joke about anxiety, and learning to say no.
280	Adam Gopnik	0:53	March 16, 2019
Gopnik discusses the infighting between liberals and progressives, his upcoming solo show at The Red Bull Theater, and the incalculable torment of sibling rivalry.
281	Tim Blake Nelson and Jill Sobule	1:03	March 23, 2019
Lazarus talks to acclaimed actor, writer, and director Nelson, as well as singer-songwriter Sobule.
282	Alyssa Mastromonaco and Peter Grosz	1:10	March 30, 2019
Lazarus talks to Obama's former Deputy Chief of Staff of Operations Mastromonaco, as well as comedy writer Peter Grosz.
