= Senator Everett =

Senator Everett may refer to:

- Charles H. Everett (1855–1947), Wisconsin State Senate
- Donn Everett (1929–2007), Kansas State Senate
- Edward Everett (1794–1865), U.S. Senator from Massachusetts from 1853 to 1854

== See also ==
- Terence Everitt (born 1974), North Carolina State Senate
