= Also a Poet =

2022 book by Ada Calhoun

Also a Poet: Frank O'Hara, My Father, and Me
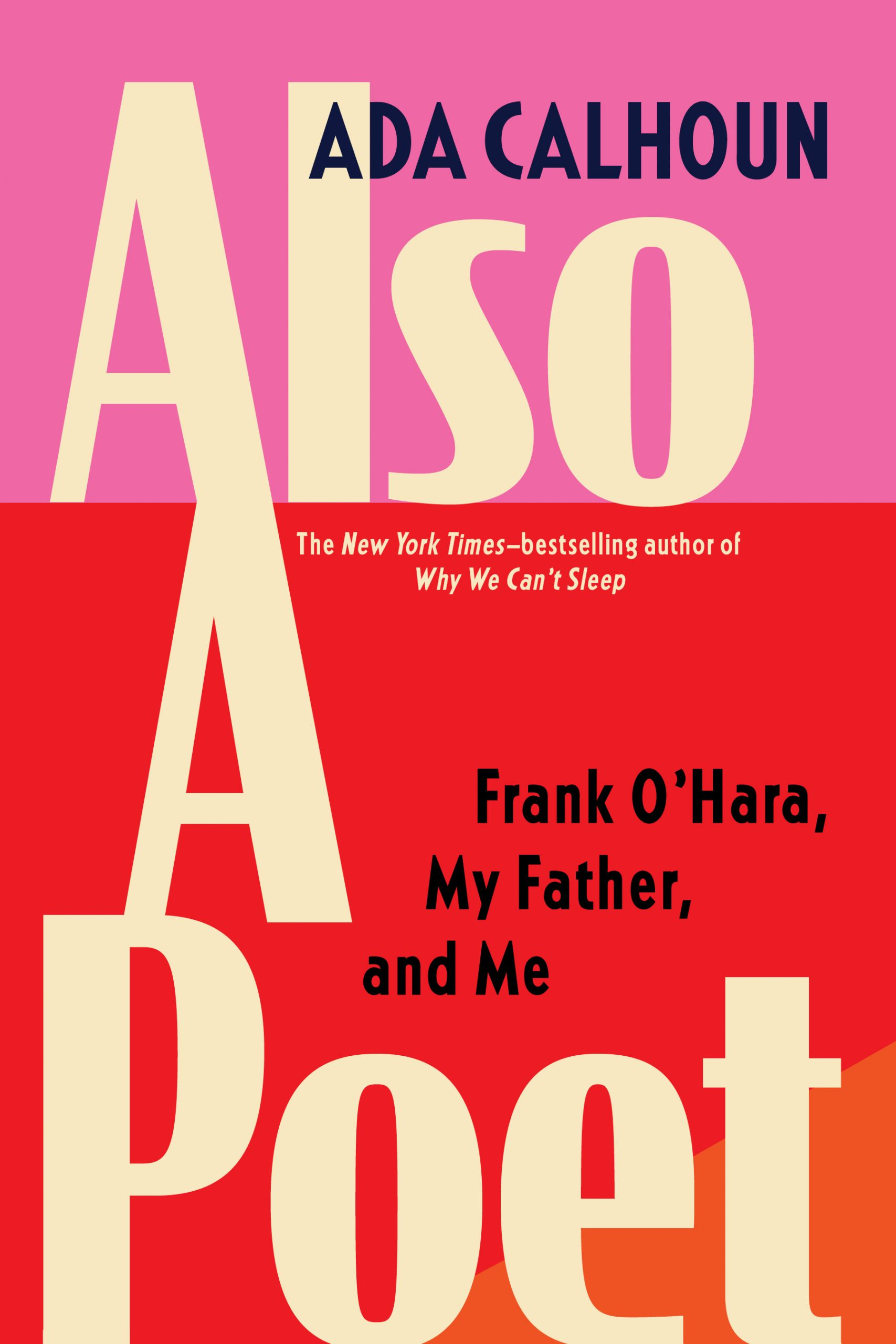
- First edition cover
- Author: Ada Calhoun
- Language: English
- Subjects: Memoir; Frank O'Hara
- Publisher: Grove Press
- Publication date: June 14, 2022
- Publication place: United States
- Media type: Print (hardcover)
- Pages: 272
- ISBN: 978-0-8021-5978-6
- Dewey Decimal: 070.92
- LC Class: PN4874.C223 A3 2022

Also a Poet: Frank O'Hara, My Father, and Me is a 2022 memoir by Ada Calhoun. It explores Calhoun's relationship with her father, the art critic Peter Schjeldahl, as well as their shared interest in the poet Frank O'Hara. The book was published on June 14, 2022, by Grove Press.

== Overview ==
Also a Poet is a memoir by Calhoun about her relationship with her father, as well as their love for the poet Frank O'Hara. The inspiration for the project came when Calhoun discovered interviews her father had done with O'Hara for a never-completed biography project. As an O'Hara fan herself, Calhoun decides to pick up where Schjeldal left off, though she quickly runs into similar issues with the O'Hara estate. The book combines literary history with a personal narrative about the complexities of parental-child relationships to tell parallel but related stories concerning the three main figures.

Like she has with other books, Calhoun also included in the backmatter a corresponding playlist. She supported the book with a major U.S. tour.

== Reception ==
Prior to publication, the book landed five starred reviews from Kirkus Reviews, Publishers Weekly, Booklist, Library Journal, and BookPage. Shelf Awareness called the memoir, "Deceptively tender and cleverly conceived." Tom Hanks, Susannah Cahalan, Alysia Abbott, and Robert Kolker also provided blurbs.

Also a Poet was covered widely across most major news outlets. The New York Times Book Review coverage by Alexandra Jacobs called the book, "A grand slam of a new memoir . . . It's a big valentine to New York City past and present, and a contribution to literary scholarship, molten with soul." Calhoun was also profiled by The New York Times around publication. The Washington Post dubbed the book, "Brave, blistering . . . Fierce, dissonant, yet compelling" and The Boston Globe review was similarly positive: "A scintillating work of personal quest and cultural history . . . As Calhoun's earlier books attest, she's a hell of an observer, writing with flair and putting herself on a tightwire, a high-risk gamble that mostly results in high rewards." Vogue ran an excerpt from the book. The Los Angeles Book Review said the book was, "an unanticipated investigation into the powers of literary estates to determine what, when, and how we read." Further praise came from Ploughshares, The New Republic, Shondaland, and Town & Country. Jenna Bush Hager also featured the book on The Today Show as one of her favorite summer reads.

The book was longlisted for the 2023 Andrew Carnegie Medal for Excellence in Nonfiction and named a July 2022 Indie Next Pick. It was also included on the Oprah Daily Summer 2022 Best Book of the Year (So Far) list and on the Best Book of the Year lists for the New York Times, The Paris Review, Washington Post, Vogue, PBS NewsHour, Kirkus Reviews, BookPage, Audible, Hudson News, Esquire, Chicago Public Library, Oprah Daily, NPR's Fresh Air, Apple Books, Literary Hub, and Publishers Lunch.
