= Senator Werts =

Senator Werts may refer to:

- George Theodore Werts (1846–1910), New Jersey State Senate
- Merrill Werts (1922–2011), Kansas State Senate

== See also ==
- George M. Wertz (1856–1928), Pennsylvania State Senate
