= Lori Bizzoco =

American columnist

Lori Bizzoco is a writer, journalist, former public relations executive.

== Early life and career ==
Lori Bizzoco earned a Master of Science in advertising from the New York Institute of Technology. She worked as a senior American public relations executive for the next 15 years, publicizing both people and products. She also held positions including Director at Burston-Marsteller, where she focused primarily on celebrity-related public relations. Bizzoco also worked for the public relations firm Porter Novelli and Edelman. In March 2006, she joined public relations firm Manning Selvage and Lee (MS&L) as Senior Vice President.

As a professional writer on dating and relationship advice, Bizzoco's pieces were regularly featured on dating sites such as Match.com, SingleEdition.com, JDate, SeniorPeopleMeet.com, and LoveandSeek.com.

== Writing ==
Bizzoco's writing has been featured on a variety of publications both in print and online. She was a writer for the Yahoo Contributor Network, where she ranked among the top writers in the community, as well as for other sites.

== Interviews ==
Bizzoco has been interviewed by The Wall Street Journal, Redbook, Woman's Day, Working Mother, WebMD, AOL, and Fox News. She was also featured in the book No Excuses: 9 Ways Women Can Change How We Think about Power by Gloria Feldt, and Cheat on Your Husband (With Your Husband), by Andrea Syrtash. Bizzoco was also interviewed in the Forbes piece "10 Phrases You Use That Are Killing Your Business."
