= Why We Can't Sleep =

2020 book by Ada Calhoun

Why We Can't Sleep: Women's New Midlife Crisis
- First edition cover
- Author: Ada Calhoun
- Language: English
- Subjects: Women's studies; self-help; gender studies
- Publisher: Grove Press
- Publication date: January 7, 2020
- Publication place: United States
- Media type: Print (hardcover)
- Pages: 288
- ISBN: 978-0-8021-4785-1
- Dewey Decimal: 305.2440973
- LC Class: HQ1059.5.U5 C35 2020

Why We Can't Sleep: Women's New Midlife Crisis is a 2020 non-fiction book by Ada Calhoun. It builds upon her essay for O, The Oprah Magazine, "The New Midlife Crisis for Women". Calhoun interviewed more than 200 women and studied social trends to identify new roadblocks for Generation X women. The book was published on January 7, 2020, by Grove Press.

== Overview ==
Why We Can't Sleep is a book by Calhoun about Generation X women and their struggles, sometimes leading to a midlife crisis, including divorce, debt, unstable housing, and career development. It builds upon her essay for O, The Oprah Magazine, "The New Midlife Crisis for Women". Calhoun interviewed more than 200 women across America about their experiences as the generation raised to "have it all." She found that many felt exhausted and overwhelmed from financial and housing stress, under or over-working in their careers, caregiving, and parenting. She learned how Generation X women responded and coped with these struggles physically and mentally, incorporating research from the Center for Economic and Policy Research and Harvard University's Equality of Opportunity Project.

After the book's release, she expanded on some foundational arguments of the book in online editorials, including caregiving and menopause.

== Reviews ==
Why We Can't Sleep: Women's New Midlife Crisis has received generally favorable pre-publication reviews. Library Journal said, "Her research offers women ways to look at but not devalue their own experiences; she addresses the fact that women often minimize their own struggles instead of recognizing how their lack of sleep, along with other physical and mental pressures, constitute legitimate crises in their own right..." Publishers Weekly said, "Calhoun persuasively reassures Gen X women that they can find a way out of their midlife crises by 'facing up to our lives as they really are'. Women of every generation will find much to relate to in this humorous yet pragmatic account..." Vogue, Real Simple, Parade, New York Times, and O, The Oprah Magazine highlighted Why We Can't Sleep as one of the most anticipated books to read in 2020.

Post-publication reviews were mixed. The New York Times Book Review’s Curtis Sittenfeld called Calhoun "a funny, smart, compassionate narrator…taking women’s concerns seriously" but also "wished Calhoun had included fewer women’s stories but gone into those stories in greater detail." The Wall Street Journal's Emily Bobrow gave the book mixed reviews, finding "many of its grumbles reassuringly familiar" but calling the book "a little whiny" and stating that Calhoun is "not above cherry-picking statistics."
