= Lana Oleen =

American politician (born 1949)

Member of the Kansas Senate from the 22nd district
- In office January 9, 1989 – January 10, 2005
- Preceded by: Merrill Werts
- Succeeded by: Roger Reitz

Personal details
- Born: April 26, 1949 (age 77) Kirksville, Missouri, U.S.
- Party: Republican
- Spouse: Kent Oleen
- Children: 2
- Education: Emporia State University

Lana Scrimsher Oleen (born April 26, 1949) is an American politician and teacher. She served in the Kansas Senate as a Republican from the 22nd district from 1989 to 2005.

== Early life ==
Oleen was born on April 26, 1949, in Kirksville, Missouri. She graduated from Topeka West High School and attended Emporia State University, where she received a bachelors of science in education in 1972 and a masters of science in 1977. She began teaching at Council Grove High School between 1972 and 1974, at Dover High School between 1975 and 1976 and at Leroy High School between 1976 and 1977. In 1978, she began teaching at St. George High School as an English, speech and drama teacher. She was a finalist for a National Endowment for the Humanities award in 1984 and received the Kansas Master Teachers award from Emporia State University Teachers College in 1985.

Before running for political office, she worked for Governor Mike Hayden. She has two children.

== Political career ==
Oleen ran for an open seat in the Kansas Senate in 1988, when Merrill Werts declined to run for re-election after serving two terms in the Senate. Oleen served as Senate majority leader during her final term in office; she was the first woman to serve a full four-year term as majority leader.

== Later life ==
Oleen was arrested for drunk driving in 2003; she received no jail time, as the result of a diversion agreement which is standard practice for first-time offenders. She declined to run for re-election in 2004. After leaving the Senate, she worked as a lobbyist for Native American gaming in Kansas.
