= Breaking News in Yuba County =

- Theatrical release poster
- Directed by: Tate Taylor
- Written by: Amanda Idoko
- Produced by: Tate Taylor; Jake Gyllenhaal; Riva Marker; Franklin Leonard; John Norris
- Starring: Allison Janney; Mila Kunis; Awkwafina; Regina Hall; Wanda Sykes; Juliette Lewis; Samira Wiley; Jimmi Simpson; Clifton Collins Jr.; Bridget Everett; Dominic Burgess; Keong Sim; Chris Lowell; Matthew Modine; Ellen Barkin
- Cinematography: Christina Voros
- Edited by: Lucy Donaldson
- Music by: Jeff Beal
- Production companies: AGC Studios; Fibonacci Films; Nine Stories Productions; The Black List; Wyolah Entertainment
- Distributed by: American International Pictures (through United Artists Releasing)
- Release date: February 12, 2021 (United States)
- Running time: 96 minutes
- Country: United States
- Language: English
- Box office: $182,918

Breaking News in Yuba County is a 2021 American comedy thriller film directed and co-produced by Tate Taylor, from a screenplay written by Amanda Idoko. The film stars an ensemble cast that includes Allison Janney, Mila Kunis, Awkwafina, Regina Hall, Wanda Sykes, Juliette Lewis, Samira Wiley, Jimmi Simpson, Clifton Collins Jr., Bridget Everett, Dominic Burgess, Keong Sim, Chris Lowell, Matthew Modine and Ellen Barkin.

Breaking News in Yuba County was released in the United States on February 12, 2021, by American International Pictures, making it the company's first release since the 1980 film Dressed to Kill.

== Plot ==
Timid Sue Buttons lives in Kentucky with her husband, Karl. She wishes to be more assertive, but others constantly take advantage of her. Unbeknownst to Sue, Karl's ex-convict brother Petey has unwillingly involved him in money laundering.

Karl has to launder three million dollars through Mina and Ray for her father, Mr. Kim. Sue, whose birthday has been ignored by everyone, drives to Karl's bank to confront him about forgetting her birthday. As she arrives, spotting Karl with flowers, she believes he is planning a surprise. Sue follows him to a motel where he is meeting his mistress Leah and walks in on them in the act. The shock and physical exertion causes Karl's heart to stop. After ordering Leah out, Sue watches TV host Gloria Michaels' program about missing child Emma Rose and decides to pretend that Karl has gone missing to receive attention and validation.

Sue buries Karl and his possessions near the motel, then files a missing persons report, but is ignored by the officers, including Detective Cam Harris. Frustrated, she trashes her home but is interrupted by her half-sister, local news reporter Nancy. Sue claims that she woke up, found her house ransacked, and assumes Karl has been abducted.

Nancy interviews Sue on the air, getting lots of local attention. Detective Harris arrives to investigate and is suspicious of Sue's inconsistent story. Petey confronts Mina and Ray about Karl's disappearance and Mina extorts him for twenty thousand dollars. After discovering Karl hadn't deposited the cash, they assume he has fled with it.

Sue gives an interview to Gloria Michaels suggesting that Karl was kidnapped as he knew who had taken Emma Rose, attracting even more attention. Petey and his boss Rita rob a jewelry store to raise the money to pay off Mina. When he delivers the ransom Mina tells him Karl will be released. Mina and Ray ambush Sue at her home looking for Karl, but leave without harming her.

Before Nancy can interview Sue and Emma Rose's parents together, Leah confronts Sue. She attempts to extort her for the missing three million, which Sue knows nothing about (she buried it, along with Karl's things). Their conversation is witnessed by Detective Harris. Sue then tells Mina that Leah knows where Karl is, so she and Ray kidnap her.

Harris, not able to question Leah and believing Sue is behind her disappearance, detains her for questioning. Nancy videos the arrest and then tips off the media, so a large crowd forms outside the police station. The interrogation is interrupted by Harris's captain, who removes her from the case and releases Sue.

Meanwhile, Rita and Petey kidnap Mina to negotiate Karl's release. However, Mr. Kim mistakenly believes that Leah is the hostage that is being negotiated for. Leah lies to him that Sue has both Mina and the money, but is killed by Ray and Mr. Kim with a drill press.

Petey receives a call that Jonelle is going into labour. When he arrives home, she reveals that she has found jewelry from the robbery, and gives him an ultimatum to give up his life of crime. Back at Rita's store, both she and her wife Debbie are shot dead by Ray, who has come to rescue Mina, after Debbie kills Mina with a hatchet. He then sets fire to the store. Petey returns to the store as Ray arrives at Petey and Jonelle's house to kill them, but she ambushes and kills him with a knife.

Sue is picked up from the police station by Nancy, who reveals that Sue's conversation with Leah was recorded by one of the interview microphones. When she demands the truth, Sue accuses her of being upset that she is getting more attention than her.

At Sue's, Mr. Kim kneecaps Nancy, so Sue confesses the truth. He brings her to the motel at gunpoint, while Harris and her partner are there investigating. Harris finds security footage of Sue at the motel.

As she is leaving, Harris spots Sue and Mr. Kim. After digging up the money, he plans to kill her until they are surprised by Harris and her partner. Mr. Kim shoots and kills Harris' partner and is shot by Harris; Sue truthfully screams that she didn't know about the money to an unmoved Harris, but the not-yet-dead Mr. Kim shoots Harris before Harris shoots him fatally. Sue tries to apologize to the dying Harris, who tells her to fuck herself before she expires.

Sizing up the situation, Sue realizes she can get off scot-free as the police will determine that Mr. Kim killed Karl and the officers before he could kill her. Emma Rose, the missing child, is found safe at a bus stop in Miami, Florida, having run away from home. One year later, Sue has written a bestselling book about her experience and is interviewed by her 'friend' Gloria Michaels.

== Cast ==
- Allison Janney as Sue Buttons
- Mila Kunis as Nancy Livingston
- Awkwafina as Mina
- Regina Hall as Detective Cam Harris
- Wanda Sykes as Rita
- Juliette Lewis as Gloria Michaels
- Samira Wiley as Jonelle
- Jimmi Simpson as Petey Buttons
- Clifton Collins Jr. as Ray
- Matthew Modine as Karl Buttons
- Ellen Barkin as Debbie
- Bridget Everett as Leah Norton
- Dominic Burgess as Captain Riggens
- Keong Sim as Mr. Kim
- Chris Lowell as Steve

== Production ==
In October 2018, it was announced Allison Janney and Laura Dern had joined the cast of the film, with Tate Taylor directing from a screenplay by Amanda Idoko. Taylor, Jake Gyllenhaal, Riva Marker and Franklin Leonard served as producers under their Nine Stories and Wyolah Films banners, while AGC Studios also produced. In May 2019, Mila Kunis, Regina Hall, Awkwafina, Samira Wiley, Bridget Everett, Jimmi Simpson and Keong Sim joined the cast of the film, with Juliette Lewis, Ellen Barkin and Wanda Sykes in advanced negotiations to join. Laura Dern was previously aboard but had to drop out of the production for scheduling reasons. In June 2019, Dominic Burgess, Matthew Modine and Chris Lowell joined the cast of the film. In July 2019, Clifton Collins Jr. joined the cast of the film.

=== Filming ===
Principal photography began on June 3, 2019, in Natchez, Mississippi and was completed on July 19, 2019.

== Release ==
In October 2020, after AGC International acquired international distribution rights to the film, American International Pictures acquired North American distribution rights, after Metro-Goldwyn-Mayer relaunched the studio that month as a label for films they acquire for digital and limited theatrical releases. It was originally scheduled to be released on January 29, 2021, but it was moved to February 12, 2021.

== Reception ==
On review aggregator website Rotten Tomatoes, the film holds an approval rating of 11% based on 37 critic reviews, with an average of 4.10/10. According to Metacritic, which sampled seven critics and calculated a weighted average score of 24 out of 100, the film received "generally unfavorable" reviews.
