= Keong Sim =

American actor

- Born: South Vietnam
- Occupation: Actor
- Years active: 2003–present
- Website: www.keongsim.com

Keong Sim is an American actor. He portrayed Dr. Sung Park in the TNT medical drama Monday Mornings and Pastor Wayne in the Netflix series Dead to Me. He is currently living in Los Angeles.

== Early life ==
Keong Sim was born in South Vietnam to South Korean parents, but moved to the United States when he was 4 years old.

== Career ==
Keong is a comedy mentor of Laughter for a Change and has acted in numerous television, film and stage productions.

In addition to his skills as an improvisational theater actor and teacher, Keong has worked at The Public Theater in New York City, and the Steppenwolf Theater in his hometown, as well as around the globe, in places such as Canada, Cuba, England and the Czech Republic. Keong has worked extensively using improvisation techniques for corporate training seminars.

== Filmography ==
=== Film ===
Year	Title	Role	Notes
2009	The Flying Scissors	Bruce Wong	
2010	The Last Airbender	Tyro	
2011	My Freakin' Family	Pastor Kim	Pilot (unaired)
2012	Watching TV with the Red Chinese	Wa	
2013	Inventing Adam	Jonathan 'Johnny' Wang	
2013	Olympus Has Fallen	South Korean Prime Minister Lee Tae-Woo	
2018	American	Kyung	Short film
2019	The Sun is Also a Star	Dae Hyun Bae	
2020	Hillbilly Elegy	Ken	
2021	Breaking News in Yuba County	Mr. Kim	
2023	Float	Mr. Liu	
2023	Godzilla Minus One	Kenji Noda	English dub

=== Television ===
Year	Title	Role	Notes
2003	Law & Order: Criminal Intent	William Suan	Episode: "A Person of Interest"
2004	Law & Order	Delivery man	Episode: "Evil Breeds"
2005	Rescue Me	Photographer	Episode: "Twat"
2010	The Forgotten	Robert Chung	Episode: "Patient John"
2010	Southland	Jason	Episode: "U-Boat"
2011	The Protector	Dr. Jia Tao	Episode: "Help"
2011	Grey's Anatomy	Dr. Park	Episode: "Heart-Shaped Box"
2011–2012	Glee	Michael Chang, Sr.	4 episodes
2013	Monday Mornings	Sung Park	Main role
2015	Scorpion	Dr. Chong	Episode: "Once Bitten, Twice Die"
2018	The Good Doctor	Leo Kwon	Episode: "Tough Titmouse"
2017	Vice Principals	Kevin Yoon	Episode: "A Compassionate Man"
2017	Law & Order True Crime	Lester Kuriyama	4 episodes
2019–22	Dead to Me	Pastor Wayne	Recurring role
2019	Better Call Saul	Ko	Episode: "Namaste"
2021	Mayans M.C.	Juan Denver	2 episodes
2023	The Lincoln Lawyer	Walter Kim	2 episodes

=== Video games ===
Year	Title	Role	Notes
2020	Yakuza: Like A Dragon	Joon-gi Han (Yeonsu Kim)	English voice
2024	Like a Dragon: Infinite Wealth	Joon-gi Han	English voice
