= John F. Hayes (Kansas legislator) =

American politician (1919–2010)

Majority Leader of the Kansas House of Representatives
- In office 1975–1977
- Preceded by: Donn Everett

Member of the Kansas House of Representatives
- In office January 9, 1967 – January 8, 1979
- Preceded by: A. Rex Cozad
- Succeeded by: Timothy P. O'Sullivan
- Constituency: 102nd district(1967-1973); 104th district(1973-1979)

Member of the Kansas House of Representatives from the 75th district
- In office January 12, 1953 – January 10, 1955
- Preceded by: John Petracek
- Succeeded by: William L. Mitchell

Personal details
- Born: December 11, 1919 Salina, Kansas, U.S.
- Died: January 14, 2010 (aged 90) Hutchinson, Kansas, U.S.
- Party: Republican
- Spouse: Elizabeth "Betty" Ireton
- Children: 2
- Education: Washburn University; Washburn Law School
- Profession: Attorney

Military service
- Allegiance: United States
- Branch/service: United States Army
- Rank: Captain
- Battles/wars: World War II

John F. Hayes (December 11, 1919 – January 14, 2010) was a Kansas attorney and former majority leader of the Kansas House of Representatives.

== Early life and family ==
Hayes was born in Salina, Kansas, on December 11, 1919, the only child of J. Frank and Helen Dye Hayes. He graduated from Hutchinson High School, Hutchinson Community College, Washburn University and Washburn Law School. While at Washburn, Hayes was initiated into the Kansas Beta chapter of Phi Delta Theta. While a student at Washburn Law, he and eight other fraternity brothers formed the Free Society of Gnip Gnop. They provided scholarships to Washburn law students for more than sixty years.

On August 10, 1950, he married Elizabeth "Betty" Ireton. Together they had two children, a son, Carl, and a daughter, Chandler. They were grandparents to five children and great grandparents to two children.

== Military service, legal career and business activities ==
Hayes served as Captain in the United States Army with service in the New Hebrides Islands and the Philippines during World War II. Upon his return home and graduation from law school, Hayes was a founding partner of the Gilliland & Hayes law firm, which has offices in Hutchinson, Wichita, Lawrence and Overland Park, Kansas. The firm celebrated its 50th anniversary on December 15, 2009.

Hayes was a Life Member of the National Conference of Commissioners on Uniform State Laws serving for more than 30 years, and a Fellow of the American College of Trial Lawyers and the American Bar Foundation. He served as president of the Reno County Bar Association and the Kansas Association of Defense Counsel. He was a member of the American Bar Association, Kansas Bar Association and the Kansas Bar Foundation.

He was a long-time director of Central Bank & Trust in Hutchinson, Kansas, and Waddell & Reed Group of Funds, Overland Park, Kansas. He also served as president of the Hutchinson Chamber of Commerce, Hutchinson Rotary Club, Hutchinson Town Club and Prairie Dunes Country Club. Hayes also served as a director and district vice-president of the Kansas State Chamber of Commerce and vice-president of the Hutchinson Symphony.

== Political activities ==
In 1952, Hayes served as a delegate to the National Republican Convention and later served six terms in the Kansas House of Representatives (1953–1955, 1967–1979) where he was chairman of the Insurance and Judiciary committees and was Majority Floor Leader from 1975 to 1977. He was credited with creating Sand Hills State Park, supporting passage of court unification and the state's no-fault insurance law, improving the Kansas State Fair and establishing the Law Enforcement Training Center in Hutchinson.

Kansas House of Representatives
Preceded by A. Rex Cozad	Member of the Kansas House of Representatives from the 102nd district January 9, 1967 - January 8, 1973	Succeeded by Lee Hamm
Kansas House of Representatives
Preceded by Walter Graber	Member of the Kansas House of Representatives from the 104th district January 8, 1973 - January 8, 1979	Succeeded by Timothy P. O'Sullivan
