= Wedding Toasts I'll Never Give =

Book by Ada Calhoun

- Cover of Wedding Toasts I'll Never Give
- Author: Ada Calhoun
- Language: English
- Genre: Memoir
- Publisher: W. W. Norton & Company
- Publication date: May 16, 2017
- Publication place: United States
- Media type: Print (hardcover)
- Pages: 192
- ISBN: 978-0-393-25479-2

Wedding Toasts I'll Never Give is a memoir by Ada Calhoun about marriage. It was inspired by the success of her New York Times "Modern Love" column, "The Wedding Toast I'll Never Give", which the paper named one of its most-read stories of 2015. The book was released on May 16, 2017 by W. W. Norton & Company.

== Overview ==
Wedding Toasts I'll Never Give is a memoir by Calhoun about marriage. It was inspired by the success of her New York Times "Modern Love" column, "The Wedding Toast I'll Never Give", which the paper named one of its most-read stories of 2015. The book was released on May 16, 2017, by W. W. Norton & Company. In the book, Calhoun presents seven personal essays, framed as "toasts", that discuss topics such as infidelity, existential anxiety, fighting in rental cars, and the "soul mates" ideal.

== Reviews ==
Wedding Toasts I'll Never Give received was praised in pre-publication reviews. Publishers Weekly calls it "A humorous, realistic, and loving look at marriage....Each essay mixes components of memoir and self-help, drawing on insight from Calhoun's own marriage as well as the wise thoughts of clergymen and lessons learned from long-married couples." Library Journal said "Alternating between hilarious personal anecdote and sobering professional insight, this memoir conveys perhaps the simplest lesson ever given about learning to make a marriage last: just don't get divorced. Her other great contribution to the literature on marital happiness might be her explanation of why fights in cars are the worst: you cannot storm off." The book received blurbs from Molly Ringwald, Susannah Cahalan, Karen Abbott, Phillip Lopate, Carlene Bauer, Davy Rothbart, Leah Carroll, Kathryn Hahn, Gretchen Rubin, Emma Straub, and Rebecca Traister. The New York Times "Modern Love" column published the first serial excerpt on April 23, 2017 as "To Stay Married, Embrace Change."
