= Ada Calhoun =

American non-fiction author

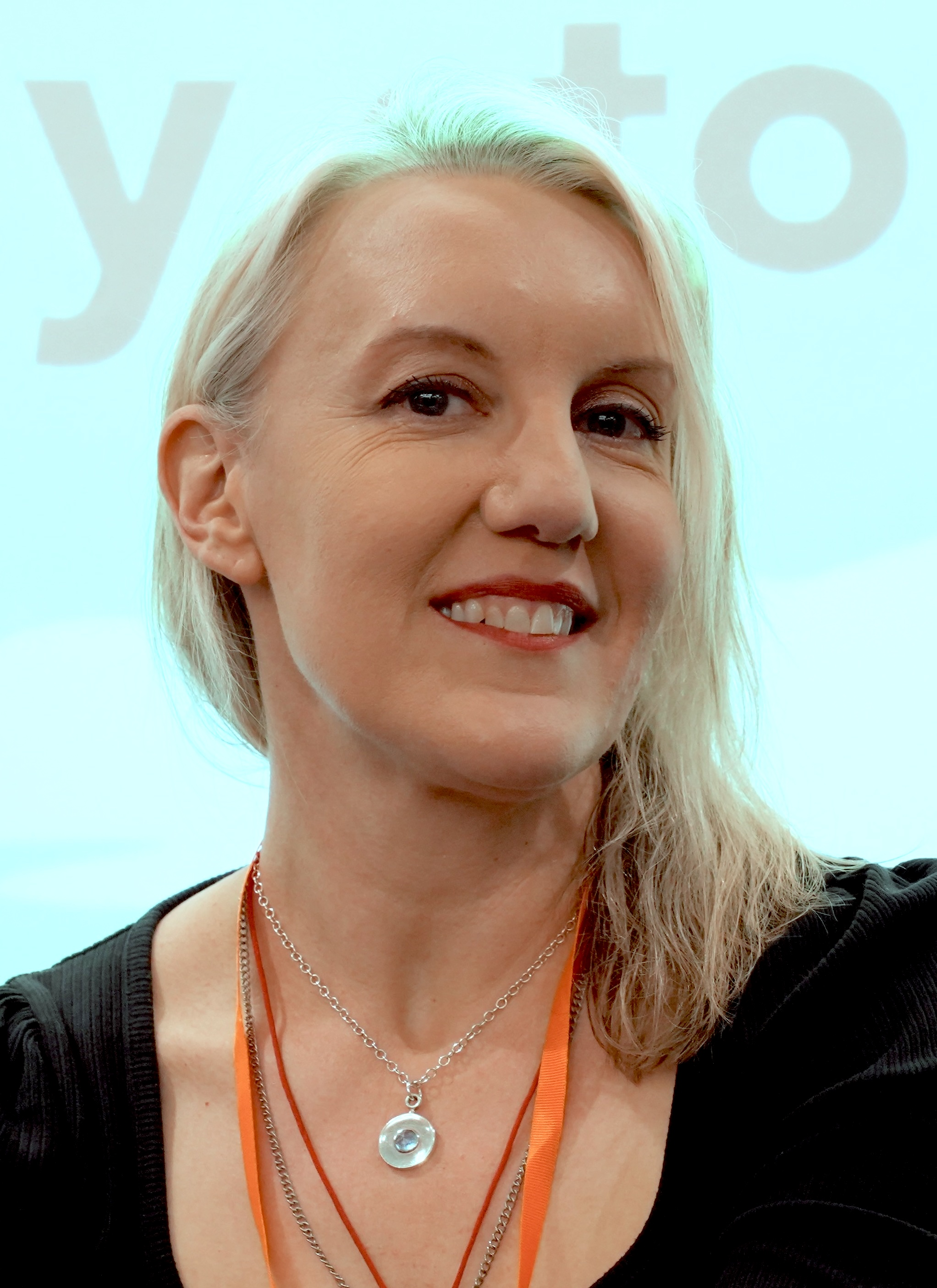
- Calhoun at Los Angeles Times Festival of Books 2025
- Born: Ada Calhoun Schjeldahl; March 17, 1976 (age 50); New York City, New York
- Education: Stuyvesant High School; University of Texas at Austin
- Occupations: Non-fiction writer, journalist, novelist
- Writing career
- Period: 1998–present
- Notable works: St. Marks Is Dead (2015), Wedding Toasts I’ll Never Give (2017), Why We Can't Sleep (2020), Also a Poet (2022)

Ada Calhoun (born Ada Calhoun Schjeldahl; March 17, 1976) is an American writer. She is the author of St. Marks Is Dead, a history of St. Mark's Place in East Village, Manhattan, New York; Wedding Toasts I’ll Never Give, a book of essays about marriage; Why We Can't Sleep, a book about Generation X women and their struggles; Also a Poet, a memoir about her father and the poet Frank O’Hara, and Crush: A Novel. She has also been a critic, frequently contributing to The New York Times Book Review; a co-author and ghostwriter, the New York Times having reported that she collaborated on the 2023 Britney Spears memoir The Woman in Me; and a freelance essayist and reporter. A Village Voice profile in 2015 said: "Her CV can seem as though it were cobbled together from the résumés of three ambitious journalists."

== Early life ==
Calhoun grew up on St. Marks Place in East Village, Manhattan. She is the only child of art critic Peter Schjeldahl and actress Brooke Alderson. They appear in her book St. Marks Is Dead, which she dedicated to them. She was mentioned in Christopher Isherwood’s diaries as “One of the most agreeable children imaginable, neither sulky nor sly nor pushy nor ugly, with a charming trustful smile for all of us …” She has written in The New York Times Magazine about a childhood fascination with the suburbs. As a teenager, she traveled through India and met Mother Teresa. She changed her name in 1998 to avoid comparison to her father.

== Writing ==
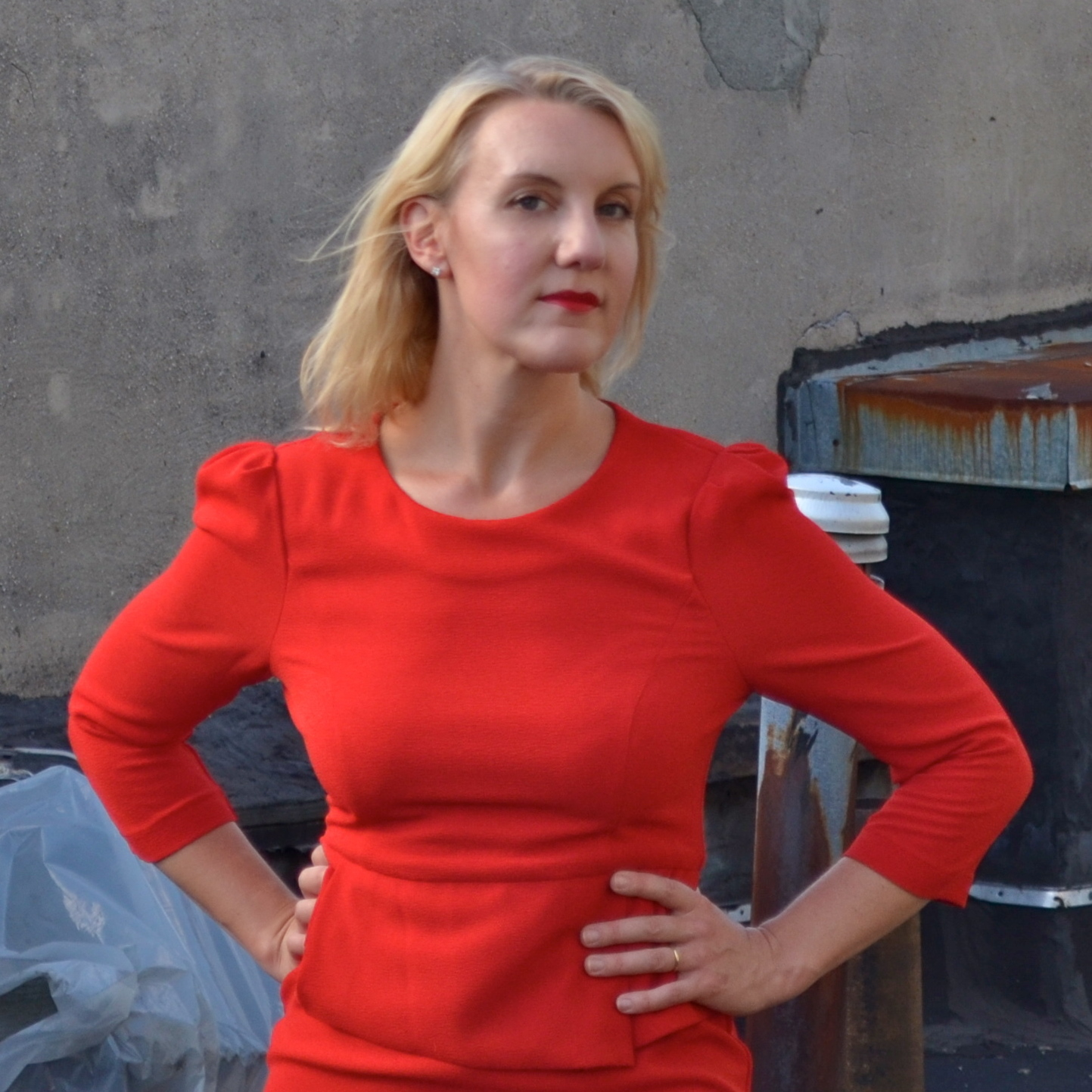
Calhoun on a St. Marks Place rooftop, 2015

As a reporter, she has written about imprisoned women in Alabama, the rap star Bobby Shmurda, and the rise of DIY abortions. She has also written personal essays, including three for The New York Times's "Modern Love" column, and four for The New York Times Magazine's "Lives" column. In 2016, W.W. Norton announced that it would publish a collection of related essays in 2017, called Wedding Toasts I’ll Never Give. In October 2017, Oprah.com published her article "The New Midlife Crisis."

=== St. Marks Is Dead ===
St. Marks Is Dead was published by W.W. Norton & Company in 2015. Calhoun wrote an op-ed that fall that explained her anti-nostalgic feelings about cities and change:

When I asked nostalgic people to name the street’s golden era, they cited a range of years—often falling between 1960 and 1982, but sometimes 1945, or 1958, or 2012. A Vassar student told me that St. Marks Place died with the fairly recent closing of the Starbucks at Cooper Union. "I came back from break," he said, "and it was gone. We used to hang out there and get cups and fill them with strawberry champagne and feel glamorous. There’s no room for life to be lived there now." I began to notice a pattern: The years people said the city was at its best almost always coincided with when they themselves were at their hottest.

St. Marks Is Dead was a New York Times Editors’ Pick, Amazon Book of the Month, and named one of the best books of the year by Kirkus Reviews, The Boston Globe, Orlando Weekly, the New York Post. The Village Voice called it "The Best Nonfiction Book About New York, 2015," and said, "With St. Marks Is Dead, Ada Calhoun just became the most important new voice on old New York."

The Atlantic wrote: "Timely, provocative, and stylishly written …Calhoun’s book serves as a welcome corrective to that rallying cry [that gentrification is bad], and to the tendency to romanticize New York City in the 1970s, when the city was far more riotous and permissive than it is now. … Her aplomb, in fact, is precisely what the discussion needs. Her portrait of neighborhood resilience might suggest more temperate proposals for an increasingly polarized debate."

The New York Times Book Review said, "Calhoun, who grew up on St. Mark’s Place, is careful not to romanticize any one era of the East Village (which serves as a suitable proxy for much of New York City during the past century). St. Marks Is Dead is an ecstatic roll call."

=== Weddings Toasts I'll Never Give ===
Wedding Toasts I’ll Never Give is a memoir about marriage. It was inspired by the success of her "Modern Love" column in The New York Times, "The Wedding Toast I’ll Never Give," which the paper named one of its most-read stories of 2015. The book was released on May 16, 2017, by W. W. Norton & Company.

In the book, Calhoun presents seven personal essays, framed as "toasts", that discuss topics such as infidelity, existential anxiety, fighting in rental cars, and the "soulmates" ideal.

Wedding Toasts I’ll Never Give was praised in pre-publication reviews. Publishers Weekly called it "A humorous, realistic, and loving look at marriage....Each essay mixes components of memoir and self-help, drawing on insight from Calhoun’s own marriage as well as the wise thoughts of clergymen and lessons learned from long-married couples." Library Journal said, "Alternating between hilarious personal anecdote and sobering professional insight, this memoir conveys perhaps the simplest lesson ever given about learning to make a marriage last: just don’t get divorced. Her other great contribution to the literature on marital happiness might be her explanation of why fights in cars are the worst: you cannot storm off." The book received blurbs from Molly Ringwald, Susannah Cahalan, Karen Abbott, Phillip Lopate, Carlene Bauer, Davy Rothbart, Leah Carroll, Kathryn Hahn, Gretchen Rubin, Emma Straub, and Rebecca Traister.

Reviews in the New York Times Book Review, The Washington Post, and elsewhere, were overall positive. The New York Times "Modern Love" column published the first serial excerpt on April 23, 2017, as "To Stay Married, Embrace Change." The book was featured on Today. In the "By the Book" column of The New York Times Book Review, Tom Hanks replied to the question "What was the last book that made you laugh?" with: "Ada Calhoun’s Wedding Toasts I’ll Never Give. I mean, underlining and yellow marker bust-out laughs."

=== Why We Can't Sleep ===
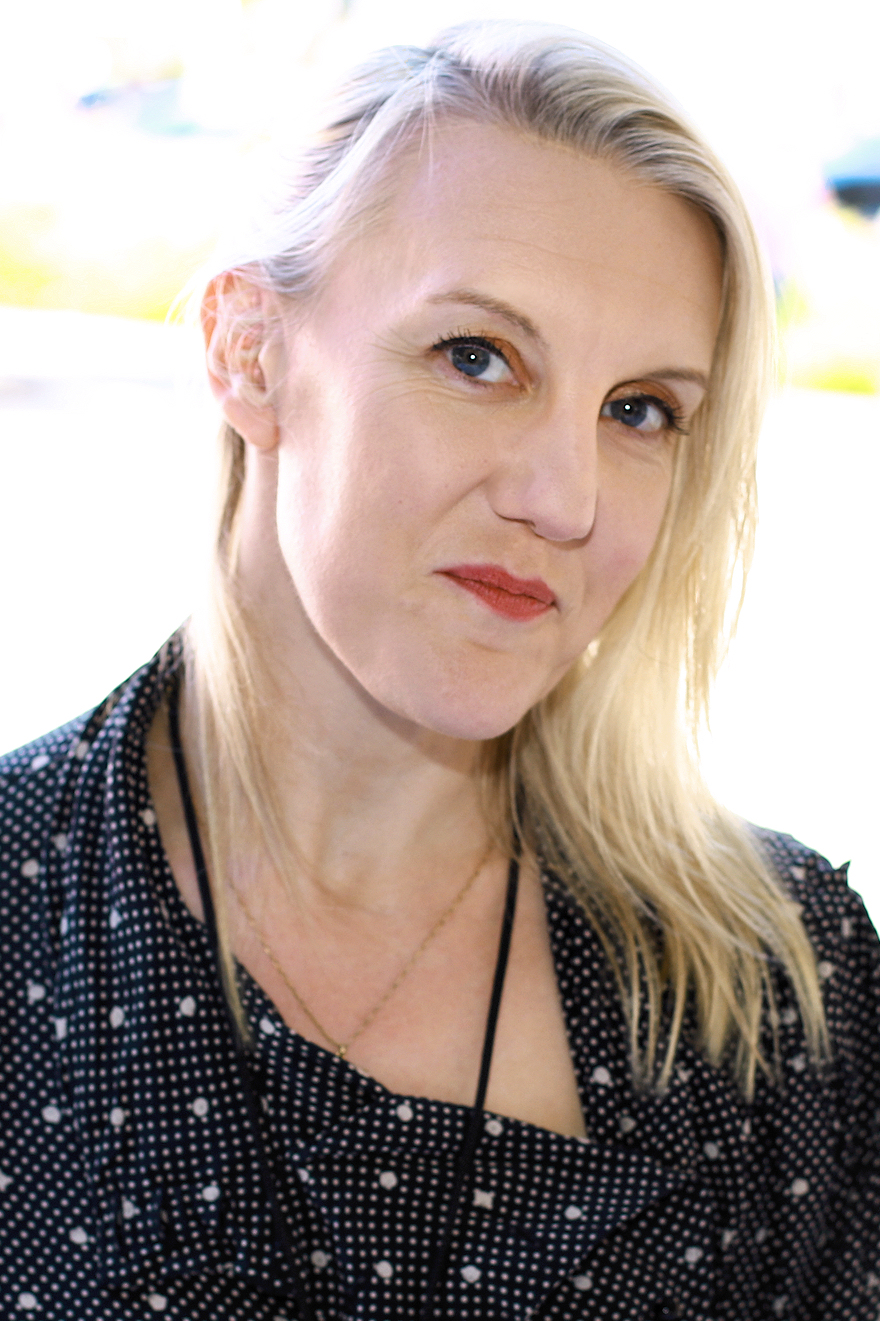
Calhoun at the 2022 Texas Book Festival

Why We Can't Sleep: Women's New Midlife Crisis is about Generation X women and their struggles, sometimes leading to a midlife crisis, including divorce, debt, unstable housing, and career development. It builds upon her popular essay for O, The Oprah Magazine, "The New Midlife Crisis for Women". Calhoun interviewed more than 200 women across America about their experiences and was fascinated how Gen-X women responded and coped with these struggles physically and mentally, inspiring her to understand why with research from the Center for Economic and Policy Research and Harvard’s Equality of Opportunity Project. The book was released on January 7, 2020, by Grove Atlantic. The book spent three weeks on the New York Times bestseller list.

Reviews were mixed. The New York Times Book Review’s Curtis Sittenfeld called Calhoun "a funny, smart, compassionate narrator…taking women’s concerns seriously" but also "wished Calhoun had included fewer women’s stories but gone into those stories in greater detail." The Wall Street Journal's Emily Bobrow found many of the book's "grumbles reassuringly familiar" but called it "a little whiny" and said Calhoun is "not above cherry-picking statistics."

=== Also a Poet ===
Also a Poet is a memoir about Calhoun's relationship with her father, as well as their shared interest in poet Frank O’Hara. A Publishers Weekly profile said, “Nothing goes as planned in Ada Calhoun’s Also a Poet: Frank O’Hara, My Father, and Me (Grove, June), but that’s precisely why it captivates. When things became difficult while she was writing the book, Calhoun stuck to her journalistic instincts and dove deeper. What she landed on was something more distinct and remarkably richer than what she’d originally envisioned.” In advance of publication, it received starred reviews from Publishers Weekly, Kirkus Reviews, Booklist, and Library Journal. It was published by Grove Atlantic on June 14, 2022, and was one of the best-reviewed books of the season, according to Literary Hub. The New York Times's Alexandra Jacobs called it "a grand slam of a new memoir" and wrote that it "is packaged as a love triangle: father, daughter and O’Hara. It’s actually a tetrahedron from which all kinds of creative characters pop forth. It’s a big valentine to New York City past and present, and a contribution to literary scholarship, molten with soul."

=== Crush ===
Ada Calhoun's first novel, Crush: A Novel, was released by Viking on February 25, 2025. In a starred review, Booklist described Crush as an “angsty, metaphysical, literature-besotted love story” with a “brainy, funny, rigorously analytical, and determined narrator… Crush (such a charged word) interrogates all that we think we know about love and soul mates, commitment and conviction, while tracking the long struggle to fully become oneself and do right.” Kirkus Reviews said, “the novel bogs down a bit once the crush has peaked,” but that it is “chock-full of great lines… Anything Ada Calhoun wants to write is well worth reading.”

== Awards ==
Calhoun won the 2016 Independent Publisher Book Award gold medal in U.S. History, 2015 USC-Annenberg National Health Journalism Fellowship, 2014 Kiplinger fellowship, 2013 Council on Contemporary Families Media Award, and 2014 Alicia Patterson Foundation fellowship; one of her Patterson stories won the 2015 Croly Award. Also a Poet was longlisted for the 2023 Andrew Carnegie Medal for Excellence in Nonfiction.

== Personal life ==
In 2004, Calhoun married Neal Medlyn, whom she met when she was sent to interview him for an Austin Chronicle profile. They have a son together. In a Vogue essay in 2022 she mentioned that she had separated, “When grief invades your life, the world becomes surreal—and, as in dreams, unexpected gifts begin to drop from the sky. After my father’s death and my separation from my partner of more than 20 years, I received an invitation to a residency I’d applied for and then forgotten about: a month in a 15th-century castle outside of Edinburgh. The playful universe seemed to be offering recompense: The ground is no longer solid beneath your feet. Here’s a castle!” She revealed in a 2024 interview that she was divorced and living back in the East Village.

Calhoun is an advocate for libraries. She is Episcopalian. She majored in Plan II Honors at the University of Texas at Austin, where for her senior thesis she translated part of the Sanskrit Atharvaveda.

== Bibliography ==
- Calhoun, Ada (2015). St. Marks Is Dead. National Geographic Books. ISBN 978-0393240382.
- Calhoun, Ada (2017). Wedding Toasts I'll Never Give. National Geographic Books. ISBN 978-0393254792.
- Calhoun, Ada (2020). Why We Can't Sleep: Women's New Midlife Crisis. ISBN 978-0-8021-4785-1.
- Calhoun, Ada (2022). Also a Poet. ISBN 978-0802159786.
- Calhoun, Ada (2025). Crush: A Novel. Penguin. ISBN 978-0593832028.
