= Baratunde Thurston =

American comedian

- Thurston in 2026
- Born: Baratunde Rafiq Thurston; September 11, 1977 (age 49); Washington, D.C., U.S.
- Education: Harvard University (BA)
- Occupations: Comedian, author
- Website: www.baratunde.com

Baratunde Rafiq Thurston (/ˌbærəˈtuːndeɪ/; born September 11, 1977) is an American writer, comedian, and commentator. Thurston co-founded the black political blog Jack and Jill Politics, whose coverage of the 2008 Democratic National Convention was archived in the Library of Congress, and was director of digital for The Onion. In 2012, his book How to Be Black became a New York Times bestseller.

== Early life and education ==
Thurston was born in Washington, D.C. He grew up at the intersection of 14th and Newton Streets in the Columbia Heights neighborhood of Washington. His father was killed when he was young and his mother worked in the Office of the Comptroller of the Currency. He has an older sister. In junior high school, his mother and he moved to a suburban black neighborhood in Maryland. Thurston was educated at the Sidwell Friends School and Harvard University where he graduated with a degree in philosophy.

== Career ==
As part of Laughing Liberally, Thurston emceed the YearlyKos convention in 2006 and also appeared in 2007.

Thurston has contributed to HuffPost and the Weekly Dig. More recently, Thurston has become a semi-regular panelist on the podcast This Week in Tech with Leo Laporte.

Thurston began hosting the Popular Science's Future of... Television show on the Science Channel in August 2009.

Thurston was the Director of Digital at The Onion, until May 2012, and co-founded the black political blog JackAndJillPolitics.com. The name of the blog is a reference to the African American youth social organization Jack and Jill of America.

His fourth book, entitled How to Be Black was published by HarperCollins on February 1, 2012, the first day of Black History Month, and is described as incorporating "satirical self-help" along with personal memoir, subjects from gardening to computers, and is "a practical guidebook for anyone looking to befriend or work with a black person, become the next black president or challenge anyone who says they speak for all black people."

On August 27, 2015, The Daily Show with Trevor Noah announced that Thurston had been named supervising producer, overseeing original digital content.

On June 23, 2020, Thurston announced his podcast, We're Having A Moment.

He hosted a two-season travelogue series on PBS called America Outdoors beginning in July 2022, which was noteworthy for its focus on different ways humans relate to their environment.

=== Books ===
- Better than Crying: Poking Fun at Politics, the Press & Pop Culture (2004)
- Keep Jerry Falwell Away from My Oreo Cookies (2005)
- Thank You Congressional Pages (For Being So Damn Sexy!) (2006)
- How to Be Black (2012)
