= Neal Medlyn =

- Born: Jerry Neal Medlin; May 21, 1975 (age 51); Palestine, Texas
- Education: Frankston High School; Stephen F. Austin University
- Occupations: Performance artist, musician
- Writing career
- Period: 1999–present

Neal Medlyn (born Jerry Neal Medlin on May 21, 1975, in Palestine, Texas) is a New York City-based performance artist and musician. His works include Champagne Jerry, his reenactment of a Beyonce concert DVD, his Pop Star Series of performance pieces, and his work in the variety show, Our Hit Parade. He has appeared on Bridget Everett's Comedy Central special, in the online series People Are Detectives, and in video work by the artist Guy Richards Smit.

== Early life ==
Medlyn attended school in Palestine, Texas and Frankston, Texas. He studied theater at Kilgore College and worked as an actor at the Texas Shakespeare Festival. He received a bachelor's degree from Stephen F. Austin State University in 1999. He has published personal essays about coming out as bisexual and about how the Gathering of the Juggalos helped him understand his Pentecostal upbringing. His video "East Texas" includes a TV clip of him winning a rap contest at the Tyler Mall as a teenager.

== Career ==
He performed in punk and noise bands in East Texas and was part of an avant-garde music scene in Nacogdoches, Texas, before moving to Austin, Texas, in 1999. In 2000, he began performing each week at coffee shops, public parks, and hotel rooms in Austin.

In 2001, he moved briefly to Berlin, Germany, and then to New York City.

From 2001 to 2005, he performed at the downtown theaters Surf Reality and Collective:Unconscious. He was named "Mr. Lower East Side" in 2003. In 2005, he had a weekly show at the Apocalypse Lounge bar, where he debuted The Lionel Richie Opera.The Lionel Richie Oper was the first of what became a seven-show series of performances, each built around a different pop star.

In 2004, he co-starred with Karen Finley for a theatrical run and subsequent tour of George and Martha, in which he played George W. Bush to Finley's Martha Stewart.

In 2005, Medlyn became a regular in the show Automatic Vaudeville at Ars Nova, performing alongside VIDS, Lin-Manuel Miranda, and Billy Eichner, and the show hosts, Bridget Everett and Kenny Mellman.

Medlyn was cast as a dancer by Adrienne Truscott in they will use the highways in 2000 and appeared in three dances choreographed by David Neumann, including "feedforward". He designed sound for Miguel Gutierrez (choreographer), winning a 2010 Bessie Award as part of the creative team for Gutierrez's "Last Meadow".

== The Neal Medlyn Experience Live ==
Medlyn reenacted a Beyoncé concert DVD, The Beyoncé Experience Live for the New Museum called The Neal Medlyn Experience Live. The show toured through the United States and Canada and was featured as a part of Gang Dance in New York City.

== Our Hit Parade ==
Medlyn was one of the co-founders and co-hosts of Our Hit Parade, a monthly top-ten pop music countdown show which ran for five years at Joe's Pub. In 2011, it was named one of Best Cabaret Shows by Time Out New York.

== The Pop Star Series ==
'The Pop Star Series' comprises seven performance pieces:

- The Lionel Richie Opera (Apocalypse Lounge, Ars Nova, and tour performances in Baltimore, Washington, D.C., Portland, Oregon, Austin, Texas)
- Coming in the Air Tonight (Galapagos Art Space)
- Unpronounceable Symbol (PS122)
- ...Her's a Queen (Dance Theater Workshop, American Realness Festival and tour performances in Portland, Oregon)
- Brave New Girl (The Chocolate Factory)
- Wicked Clown Love (The Kitchen and tour performances in Kittery, Maine, Los Angeles, California)
- King (The Kitchen, American Realness Festival)

The series was presented as part of the American Realness Festival in 2015 and as part of the Live Art Festival at Kampnagel in Hamburg Germany in 2014.

In 2015, 53rd State Press published a coffee-table book featuring photos and text of the shows.

== Champagne Jerry ==
In 2013, Medlyn began performing as the rapper Champagne Jerry at venues including the Brooklyn Academy of Music, The Kitchen, New York Live Arts, Union Pool, and Pianos.

Champagne Jerry was named one of the top ten best performers in New York by Time Out. He was profiled in Rolling Stone, Brooklyn Vegan, and Interview. In 2016, he appeared as the musical guest on The Chris Gethard Show on Fusion TV.

Champagne Jerry's collaborators include Max Tannone, Ad-Rock (Adam Horovitz)), Sophia Cleary, Farris Craddock, and Gillian Walsh, who performs as "the Ghost of Champagne Past."

Champagne Jerry has produced two albums: For Real, You Guys and "The Champagne Room". He has posted several videos on YouTube, including one for "Yo Kev" that features Adam Horovitz, Murray Hill, and Bridget Everett.

== Personal life ==
At age 18, Medlyn married and had a son. The marriage ended in divorce. In 2004, he married author Ada Calhoun, with whom he also has a son, they split in 2022.
