= Bridget Everett =

American actress and singer (born 1972)

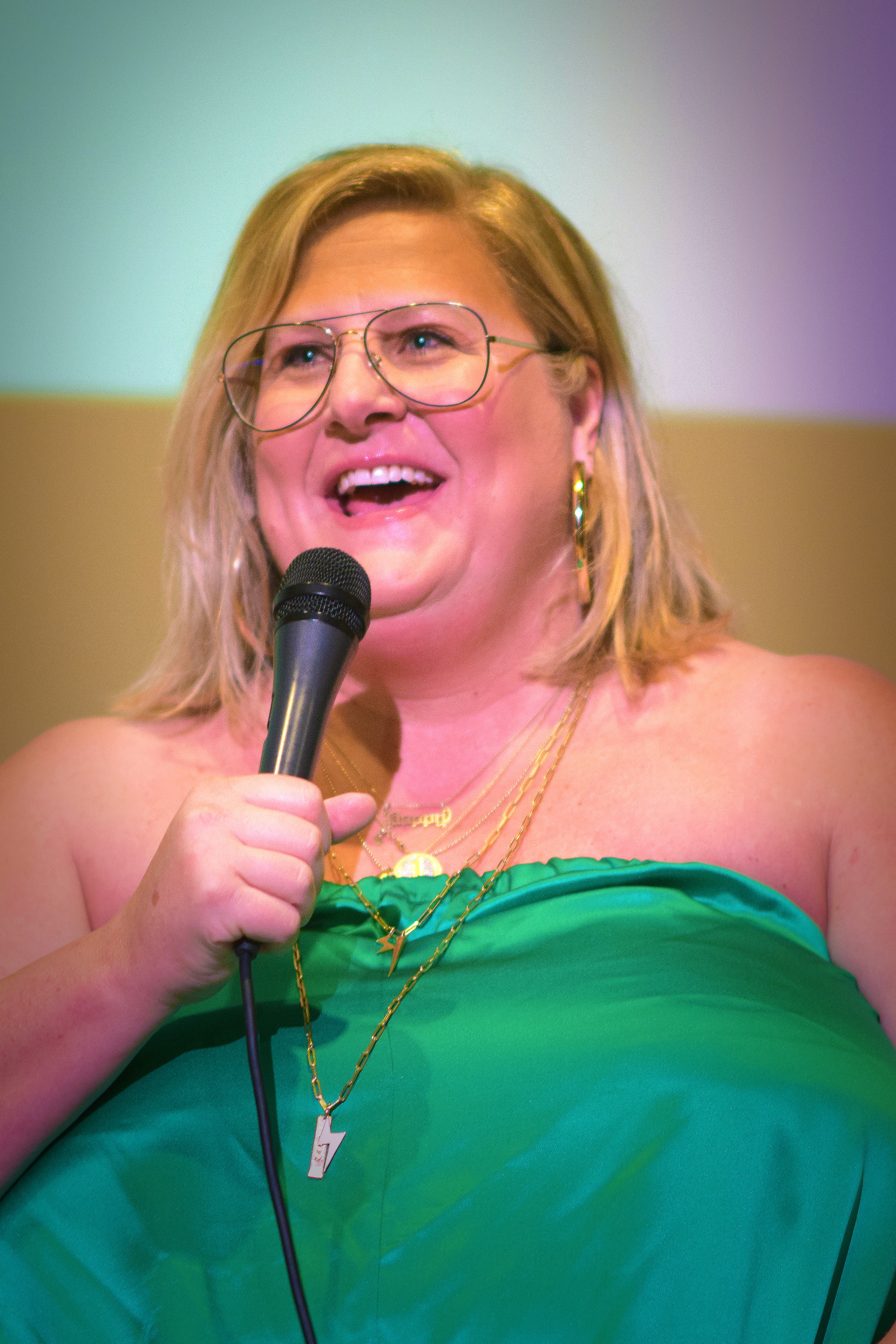
- Everett in 2023
- Born: April 21, 1972 (age 54); Manhattan, Kansas, U.S.
- Education: Arizona State University, Tempe (BM)
- Father: Donn Everett

Comedy career
- Years active: 2007–present
- Medium: Cabaret, film, music, podcast, stand-up, storytelling, television
- Website: bridgeteverett.net

Bridget Everett (born April 21, 1972) is an American comedian, actress, singer, writer, and cabaret performer. She began her career appearing and co-writing alongside Michael Patrick King the Off-Broadway musical comedy At Least It's Pink: A Trashy Little Show (2007). The following year she made her screen debut with a minor role in the romantic comedy film Sex and the City, also directed by King. She later performed on Inside Amy Schumer (2013–16), the comedy film Trainwreck (2015), and her own one-hour Comedy Central special Bridget Everett: Gynecological Wonder (2015). Everett has described herself as an "alt-cabaret provocateur".

In 2017, Everett starred in three films: the comedy Fun Mom Dinner, the horror-comedy Little Evil, and the drama Patti Cake$. In 2021, she appeared in the comedy film Breaking News in Yuba County. In 2022, Everett began starring in and executive producing the semi-autobiographical HBO comedy-drama series Somebody Somewhere, for which she earned a Television Critics Association Award for Individual Achievement in Comedy, a Peabody Award, and a nomination for a Primetime Emmy Award.

== Early life ==
Bridget Everett was born on April 21, 1972 in Manhattan, Kansas. She is the youngest of six children born to Frederica "Freddie" and Donn James Everett. Her parents separated before she was born, and divorced when she was eight. Her father was not around much. As Everett stated on the podcast Amy Schumer Presents: 3 Girls, 1 Keith (episode 2: "Moms and Stuff"): "I'm from Manhattan, Kansas - the little apple. And my dad was mayor at one point, and then so was my brother many years later. So we're kinda like the Kennedys of Manhattan, Kansas." Her father, an attorney, served as a Republican in the Kansas State Senate and Kansas House of Representatives from 1969 to 1978. Her mother was a music teacher and gave her a love of music.

Growing up, Everett participated in competitive swimming and was involved in both traditional and show choir. She attended college at Arizona State University (ASU) on a full scholarship to study music and opera. She graduated from ASU in 1995 with a degree in vocal performance.

Everett moved to New York in 1997 and worked as a waitress. She got her Equity card doing a bus-and-truck children's-theatre tour of Hansel and Gretel. She worked in the restaurant business for 25 years before she was finally able to quit around the beginning of 2015.

== Career ==
=== 2007–2016 ===
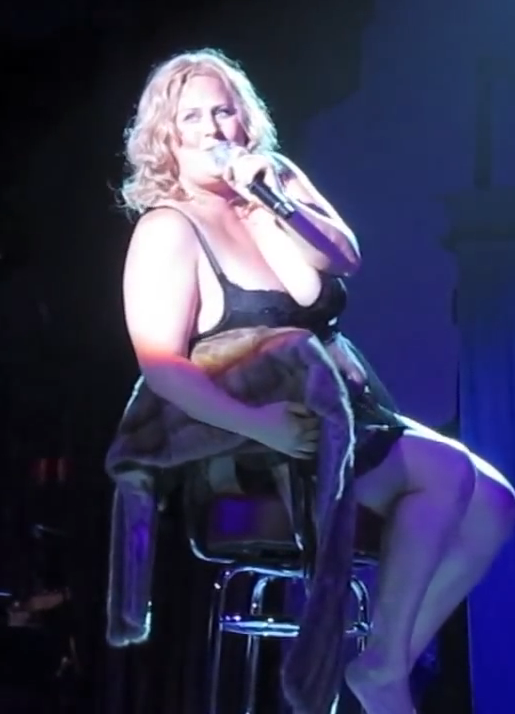
Everett at La Mama Theatre in Melbourne in 2012

In 2007, Everett starred and co-wrote alongside Michael Patrick King the off-Broadway musical comedy At Least It's Pink: A Trashy Little Show. King gave her a small part in the 2008 Sex and the City movie, as a drunk woman who interviews to be Carrie's assistant. Everett met Amy Schumer at the Just for Laughs comedy festival in 2009. Everett has been regularly opening for Schumer on her comedy tours since 2012. Everett has even upstaged Schumer, which then led Schumer to prefer to have Everett close for her instead, according to Schumer on her podcast.

Everett often performs with her band, The Tender Moments, which includes Adam "Ad-Rock" Horovitz from the Beastie Boys and Carmine Covelli from The Julie Ruin. In October 2013, Everett and Horovitz performed in a show called Rock Bottom that the two co-wrote with Hairspray songwriters Marc Shaiman and Scott Wittman. Rock Bottom won Everett the 2015 Obie Awards Special Citation presented by the American Theatre Wing. In 2013, Bridget Everett and the Tender Moments released a 12-track album titled Pound It! Everett has also performed with Brad Williams in a show called Down n Dirty (hosted by Broad City's Abbi Jacobson and Ilana Glazer) at the 2014 Bonnaroo Music Festival. Everett performed a duet of "Me and Bobby McGee" with Patti LuPone at Carnegie Hall in 2013.

Everett made her first television appearance in 2012, playing a guest-starring role in the CBS sitcom 2 Broke Girls. She had secondary roles in films Gayby (2012) and The Opposite Sex (2014), and in 2015 appeared in the Amy Schumer comedy film Trainwreck. Everett's first one-hour TV special, Bridget Everett: Gynecological Wonder, premiered on Comedy Central in 2015. In it, she performs her usual brand of comedy cabaret.

=== 2017–present ===
In 2017, Everett starred in four movies; two premiered at the 2017 Sundance Film Festival. She starred alongside Toni Collette and Molly Shannon in the comedy film Fun Mom Dinner. It received generally negative reviews from critics, but her performance was noted by The New York Times. In the dramatic film Patti Cake$, Everett played Barb Dombrowski, marking her screen breakout as the alcoholic mother of Danielle Macdonald's character Patti Dombrowski. Patti Cake$ received generally positive reviews from critics, and Everett specifically received praise. Matt Zoller Seitz from RogerEbert.com wrote in his review: "Everett's history of using her considerable weight and height as comic fuel in standup and cabaret made her a perfect choice for this role, but she's as strong in the arguments and drunk scenes as she is when she's singing or cracking wise. If there's any justice, this should be a career-redefining performance on the order of Frank Sinatra's in From Here to Eternity." Later that year, she appeared in the romantic comedy-drama film Permission, and the horror comedy film Little Evil. Also in 2017, Everett went to star in the Amazon comedy pilot Love You More.

On August 1, 2017, Everett got a standing ovation for her "Piece of My Heart" karaoke performance on The Tonight Show Starring Jimmy Fallon. On January 3, 2018 The Tonight Show aired a repeat of Everett performing "Piece of My Heart". She also performed the song in the third episode of the 2022 TV show Somebody Somewhere.

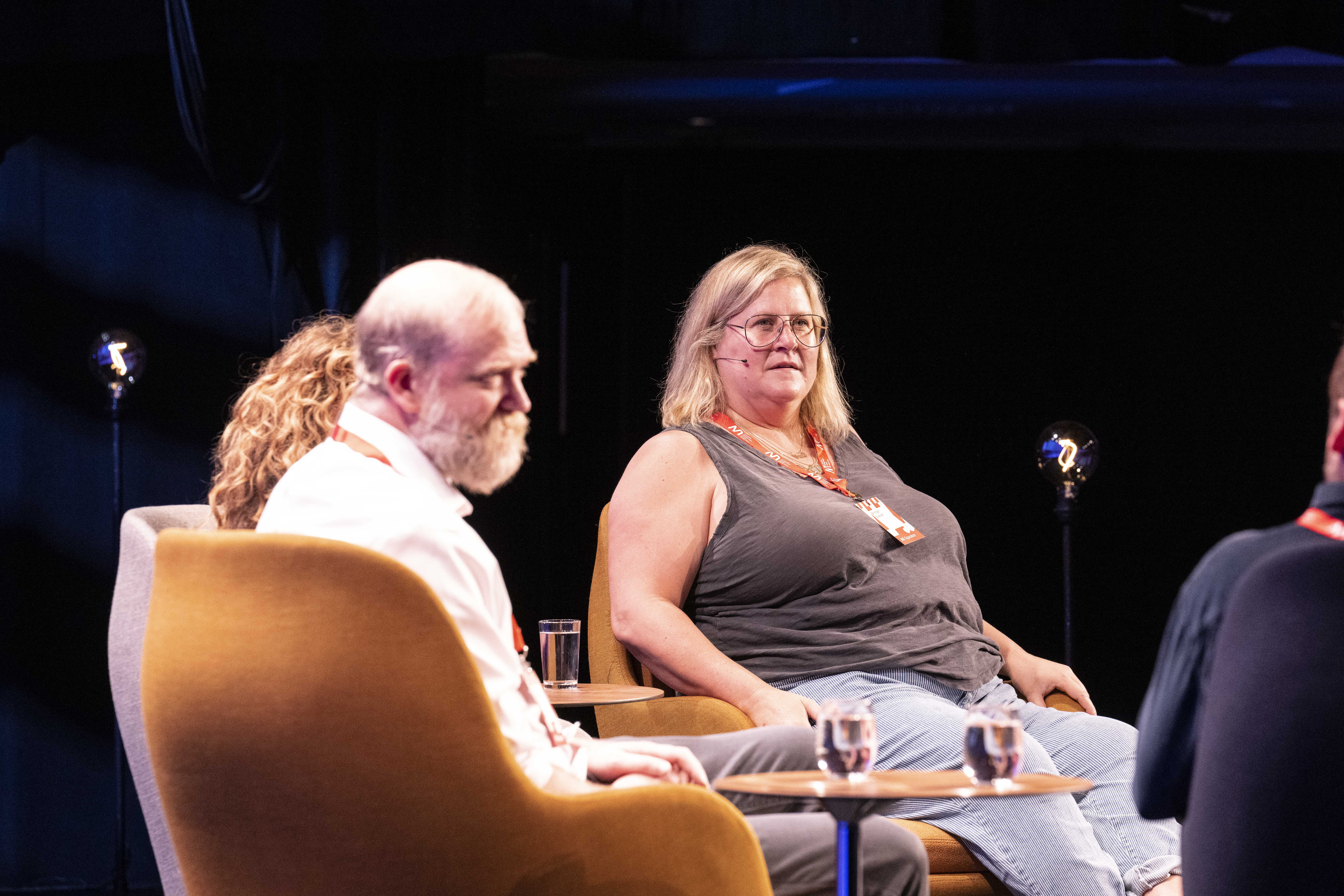
Everett at the Somebody Somewhere event in 2023

In 2018, Everett had a recurring role in the short-lived HBO comedy series, Camping. The following year, she appeared in the Netflix miniseries, Unbelievable playing Colleen Doggett, one of the foster parents of teenage victim Marie Adler (Kaitlyn Dever). In 2021, she appeared in the black comedy film Breaking News in Yuba County directed by Tate Taylor.

In 2022, Everett began starring in the HBO comedy-drama series Somebody Somewhere playing the leading role of Sam, a woman in her 40s trying to find happiness. Her performance received positive reviews from critics. Ciara Wardlow from RogerEbert.com wrote in her review: "Everett is remarkable as a woman who hides behind a mask of apathy and witty barbs. She’s hardly the sort to talk about her feelings by choice, but Everett’s performance manages to consistently convey to the audience things that Sam refuses to say or acknowledge with crystal clarity. It’s a subtle and compelling portrait of grief, a sadness that creates an intriguing counterbalance to the bold and bawdy sense of humor for which Everett is known, which also gets plenty of opportunity to shine." The Rotten Tomatoes critical consensus reads, "Led by a captivating Bridget Everett,Somebody Somewhere explores the human condition with tenderness, grace, and warmth. At the 38th Independent Spirit Awards, Everett received nomination for the Best Lead Performance in a New Scripted Series. She was also nominated for an TCA Award for Individual Achievement in Comedy. The show received the 84th Peabody Award in Entertainment.

== Political advocacy ==
In 2023, after the homophobic murder of Laura Ann Carleton, Everett made statements in support of the LGBT community, stating, "Lauri Carleton was shot and killed at her Lake Arrowhead store this weekend. Someone tore down the Pride flag she flew outside of her store, Magpi. She confronted him and he shot her... All that anti-LGBTQ rhetoric has a price."

== Filmography ==
=== Film ===
Year	Title	Role	Notes
2008	Sex and the City	Cathy	
2012	Gayby	Bridget	
2014	Are You Joking?	Waitress	
2014	The Opposite Sex	Stella	
2015	Trainwreck	Kat	
2017	Patti Cake$	Barb Dombrowski	Winner - Best Supporting Actress: Film Club's The Lost Weekend Award
2017	Fun Mom Dinner	Melanie	
2017	Permission	Charlie	
2017	Little Evil	Al	
2020	The Stand In	Herself	
2021	Breaking News in Yuba County	Leah Norton	
2021	Rumble	Lady Mayhen (voice)	
2025	Wake Up Dead Man	Louise	

=== Television ===
Year	Title	Role	Episodes/Notes
2009	Jeffery & Cole Casserole	Herself	Cabaret act
2012	Funny As Hell	Herself	Episode 2.8
2012	2 Broke Girls	Shonda	Episode: "And the One-Night Stands"
2012	She's Living for This	Herself	Episode: "The Bianca Del Rio Episode"
2013–2022	Inside Amy Schumer	Herself/Various	11 episodes
2015	The Bachelorette	Herself	Episode: "11.3"
2015	CollegeHumor's Comedy Music Hall of Fame	Herself	Television special
2015	Bridget Everett: Gynecological Wonder	Herself	Television special, also writer/executive producer
2015	Difficult People	Herself	Episode: "Pledge Week"
2016	Girls	Bebe	Episode: "Wedding Day"
2016	Party Legends	Herself	Episode: "Am I in the Morgue?"
2016	@midnight	Herself/Contestant	Episode: "November 17, 2016"
2016	Joe's Pub Presents: A Holiday Special	Herself	Television special
2016–2017	Lady Dynamite	Dagmar	12 episodes
2017	Saving a Legend	Alice Dugan	Television pilot
2017	Full Frontal with Samantha Bee	Herself	Episode: "Not the White House Correspondents' Dinner"
2017	Love You More	Karen Best	Television pilot
2017	No Activity	Special Agent Bonnie Lehman	Episode: "Golden Age of Tunnels"
2018	The Real Housewives of New York City	Herself	Episode: "Life is a Cabaret"
2018	Another Period	Mrs. Slagsby	Episode: "Little Orphan Garfield"
2018	Camping	Harry	5 episodes
2018	Bobcat Goldthwait's Misfits & Monsters	Mermaid	Episode: "Mermaid"
2019	Historical Roasts	Isis	Episode: "Cleopatra Roast"
2019	Twelve Forever	Judy (voice)	8 episodes
2019	Unbelievable	Colleen Doggett	3 episodes
2019	Living with Yourself	Weinrod	Episode: "Nice Knowing You"
2019	The Coop	Detective Sally	Episode: "Who-Dun-It"
2019	Nailed It! Holiday	Herself/Guest Judge	Episode: "It's a Wonderfail Life"
2019–2020	At Home with Amy Sedaris	Crystal Dangles/Teresa	2 episodes
2020	AJ and the Queen	Anna	Episode: "Little Rock"
2020	The Boss Baby: Back in Business	Rattleshake CEO Baby (voice)	Episode" The Coo Coo Chi Coup"
2020	Worst Cooks in America: Celebrity Edition	Herself/Contestant	6 episodes
2021	Bob's Burgers	Officer Bridge (voice)	Episode: "Some Kind of Fender Benderful"
2022	Would I Lie to You?	Herself	Episode: "Singing Waitress"
2022–2024	Somebody Somewhere	Sam Miller	Main role (21 episodes), also writer and executive producer
2023	Carol & the End of the World	Elena (voice)	3 episodes
2025	King of Drag	Herself	Guest judge; 1 episode

=== Music videos ===
Year	Artist	Song	Role
2006	Moby featuring Debbie Harry	"New York, New York"	Tammy
2014	Bridget Everett and the Tender Moments	"What I Gotta Do"	Herself
2014	Bridget Everett and the Tender Moments	"Titties"	Herself
2015	Jon Spencer Blues Explosion	"Betty Vs The NYPD"	Line-up Suspect #4

=== Video games ===
Year	Title	Role
2013	Grand Theft Auto V	Additional motion capture

== Stage ==
Year	Title	Notes
2007	At Least It's Pink: A Trashy Little Show	written by Everett, Michael Patrick King and Kenny Mellman; original music and lyrics by Kenny Mellman and Everett, directed by Michael Patrick King
2009	Miss Fag Hag Pageant	with Kenny Mellman
2009–2012	Our Hit Parade	video
2009, 2010, 2013, 2015, 2018	Just for Laughs	comedy festival in Chicago and Montreal
2011	Carlos Cañedo Is Filling Gaps	featuring Adam Horovitz and Bridget Everett, venue: Public Assembly, Brooklyn
2012–present	Amy Schumer comedy tours	opening/closing act
2013	Bridget Everett's Rock Bottom	venue: Joe's Pub
2013	Outside Lands Music and Arts Festival	venue: The Barbary Stage
2014	SF Sketchfest	with Dave Hill
2014	Festival Supreme	video
2014	Down n Dirty	with Brad Williams at Bonnaroo Music Festival
2015	The Lilly Awards	Broadway cabaret show at The Cutting Room, video
2016	Bridget Everett and the Tender Moments: Pound It Fall Tour	2017–2018 dates added later
2018	Cal Jam	music festival
2023	Gutenberg! The Musical!	One night only cameo as The Producer at the James Earl Jones Theatre, Broadway

== Discography ==
All releases are with The Tender Moments and all formats are download and streaming.

=== Albums ===
- 2013: Pound It (Beavertails Music)
- 2015: Gynecological Wonder (Comedy Partners)

=== Singles ===
- 2013: "Titties"
- 2013: "What I Gotta Do?" (Dirty Version)
- 2016: "Eat It"
- 2017: "Pussy Grabs Back" (All proceeds go to Planned Parenthood, download only.)
- 2021: “Have Yourself a Merry Little Christmas” (w/ Matt Ray)
- 2023: “Home”
- 2023: “Thanking You”

=== Home videos ===
- 2015: Gynecological Wonder (Comedy Central)

=== Compilations ===
- 2018: Just For Laughs - Premium, Vol. 25 (Track 3: “Put Your Dick Away (Jfl 2015)”)

=== Collaborations ===
- 2014: Champagne Jerry: For Real, You Guys - 3 songs: "More Wet", "Aspirbations Skit" (feat. Adam Horovitz & Bridget Everett) & "Just Woke Up" (vocals)
- 2015: The Dan Band: The Wedding Album - song: "Making Love Forever" (vocals and songwriter)
- 2016: Champagne Jerry: The Champagne Room - song: "One Talent" (feat. Bridget Everett, Murray Hill, Erin Markey, Larry Krone, Jim Andralis & the Champagne Club) (vocals)
- 2016: Jim Andralis & Bridget Everett: "Hit the Ground Fuckin'" - Single (backing vocals)
- 2020: Morgan James: She Is Risen, Vol. 2 EP - 5 songs
- 2022: Raymond Angry & Timo Elliston: Life & Beth (Original Series Soundtrack) (Track 9: “Blue Bayou”)

== Accolades ==
Year	Award	Category	Nominee(s)	Result	Ref.
2022	Dorian Awards	TV Lead Performance	Somebody Somewhere	Nominated	
2022	Hollywood Critics Association Awards	Best Actress in a Broadcast Network or Cable Series, Comedy	Somebody Somewhere	Nominated	
2022	Television Critics Association Awards	Individual Achievement in Comedy	Somebody Somewhere	Nominated	
2023	American Film Institute Awards	Top 10 Television Programs of 2022	Somebody Somewhere	Won	
2023	Independent Spirit Awards	Best Lead Performance in a New Scripted Series	Somebody Somewhere	Nominated	
2023	Peabody Awards	Entertainment	Somebody Somewhere	Nominated	
2024	Critics' Choice Television Awards	Best Actress in a Comedy Series	Somebody Somewhere	Nominated	
2024	Peabody Awards	Entertainment	Somebody Somewhere	Won	
2025	Primetime Emmy Awards	Outstanding Writing for a Comedy Series	Somebody Somewhere (Episode: "AGG")	Nominated	
2025	Television Critics Association Awards	Individual Achievement in Comedy	Somebody Somewhere	Won	
