= St. Marks Is Dead =

Book by Ada Calhoun

- First edition
- Author: Ada Calhoun
- Language: English
- Genre: Nonfiction
- Publisher: W. W. Norton & Company
- Publication date: November 15, 2015
- Publication place: United States
- Media type: Print (hardcover)
- Pages: 256
- ISBN: 978-0393240382

St. Marks Is Dead: The Many Lives of America's Hippest Street is a nonfiction book by Ada Calhoun about the history of St. Mark's Place, a three-block stretch of the East Village neighborhood of Manhattan. Calhoun, who grew up on the street, shows how disillusioned bohemians of every era have declared "St. Marks Is Dead" when their era on the street passed. The book was released on November 2, 2015, by W. W. Norton & Company. It was named by many publications one of the best books of 2015.

== Summary ==
In a narrative history informed by 250 interviews and 70 rare images, St. Marks native Ada Calhoun profiles iconic characters, including W. H. Auden, Abbie Hoffman, Keith Haring, Beastie Boys, Frank O'Hara, Emma Goldman, The Velvet Underground, and the New York Dolls. She argues that St. Marks has variously been an elite address, an immigrants' haven, a mafia warzone, a hippie paradise, and a backdrop to the film Kids―and always been a place that outsiders call home. The book is organized around pivotal moments throughout history when denizens declared "St. Marks is dead."

== Reception ==
St. Marks Is Dead was a New York Times Editors’ Pick, Amazon.com Book of the Month, and named one of the best books of the year by Kirkus Reviews, The Boston Globe, Orlando Weekly, and New York Post. The Village Voice called it, "The Best Nonfiction Book About New York, 2015," and said, "With St. Marks Is Dead, Ada Calhoun just became the most important new voice on old New York."

The Atlantic wrote: "Timely, provocative, and stylishly written …Calhoun's book serves as a welcome corrective to that rallying cry [that gentrification is bad], and to the tendency to romanticize New York City in the 1970s, when the city was far more riotous and permissive than it is now. … Her aplomb, in fact, is precisely what the discussion needs. Her portrait of neighborhood resilience might suggest more temperate proposals for an increasingly polarized debate."

The New York Times Book Review said, "Calhoun, who grew up on St. Mark's Place, is careful not to romanticize any one era of the East Village (which serves as a suitable proxy for much of New York City during the past century). St. Marks Is Dead is an ecstatic roll call." The book won the 2016 Independent Publisher Book Awards gold medal in U.S. History.
