= Donn Everett =

American politician (1929–2007)

Member of the Kansas State Senate from the 22nd District
- In office 1975–1978
- Preceded by: Richard Dean Rogers
- Succeeded by: Merrill Werts

Majority Leader of the Kansas House of Representatives
- Succeeded by: John F. Hayes

Member of the Kansas House of Representatives from the 66th District
- In office 1973–1975

Member of the Kansas House of Representatives from the 57th District
- In office 1969–1972

Personal details
- Born: April 29, 1929 Emporia, Kansas, U.S.
- Died: November 29, 2007 Manhattan, Kansas, U.S.
- Party: Republican
- Spouse(s): Frederica Voiland (m. 1956; div.); Elizabeth Everett
- Children: 6, incl. Bridget Everett
- Education: University of Kansas (B.A. and J.D.)

Donn James Everett (April 29, 1929 – November 29, 2007) was an American politician who served as a Republican in the Kansas State Senate and Kansas House of Representatives from 1969 to 1978.

Everett was born in Emporia, Kansas. He served in the U.S. Marine Corps during the Korean War; after returning to Kansas, he married Frederica Voiland in 1956 and worked as an attorney. The couple had six children before divorcing acrimoniously; the youngest child, Bridget Everett, became a noted comedian and cabaret performer.

Everett's first forays into elected office were winning races for county attorney of Riley County and serving as a member of the city council in Manhattan, Kansas (including a stint as mayor). In 1968, he was elected to the Kansas House, serving until 1975. While in the Kansas House, he rose to the post of Majority Leader.

During his fourth term, in 1975, he was appointed to the Kansas Senate to fill the seat left vacant by Richard Dean Rogers, who resigned to serve as a federal judge. He served in the Senate until his own resignation in 1978.
