= Merrill Werts =

American politician

Merrill H. Werts

Member of the Kansas Senate from the 22nd district
- In office 1979 – January 9, 1989
- Preceded by: Donn Everett
- Succeeded by: Lana Oleen

Personal details
- Born: November 17, 1922 Smith Center, Kansas
- Died: September 22, 2011 Junction City, Kansas
- Party: Republican
- Spouse(s): Dorothy Wilson, 57 years
- Education: Kansas State University (undergraduate); Cornell University (Master's degree)

Merrill H. Werts (November 17, 1922–September 22, 2011) was an American politician who served in the Kansas Senate as a Republican from the 22nd district from 1979 to 1989.

Werts was born in Smith Center, Kansas and raised on a farm. He attended Kansas State University, but his education there was interrupted by service in World War II; Werts entered the U.S. Army in June 1943 and fought in the European theater, losing a leg in Germany. He left the Army in March 1946 and returned to KSU, graduating in 1947. He received a master's degree in agricultural economics from Cornell University in 1948.

After completing his education, Werts worked in banking, eventually rising to become president of a bank in Junction City, Kansas. He was elected to the State Senate in 1978, taking office in 1979; in 1988, he declined to run for re-election, and Lana Oleen succeeded him in the Senate.
