= How to Be Black =

2012 book by Baratunde Thurston

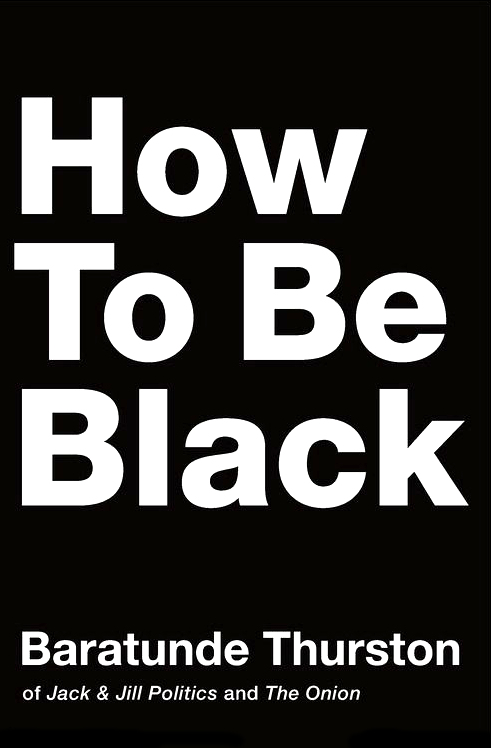
- Author: Baratunde Thurston
- Language: English
- Publisher: HarperCollins
- Publication date: January 31, 2012
- Publication place: United States
- Pages: 272
- ISBN: 9780062003225

How to Be Black is a book written by the American comedian Baratunde Thurston. It is an autobiographical account of Thurston's life and upbringing and discusses stereotypes of African Americans, their social identities, and their relationships with their white peers.

In describing the book, Thurston said he hopes it exposes the reader to "another side of the black experience while offering practical, comedic advice based on [his] own painful lessons learned" and that "If you don't have a sense of humor this book will upset you greatly."

The book is a New York Times Best Seller.

== Television adaptation ==
In September 2021, it was reported that an animated television series adaptation of the book was in development at ABC. It will be produced by 20th Century Animation and ABC Signature with Thurston as writer and executive producer alongside Courtney Lilly. However, in October 2022, ABC decided not to proceed into a pilot as they will not be focusing on animation.

== Reception ==
J. Victoria Sanders of the San Francisco Chronicle said the book "makes light of uncomfortable truths about America's awkward relationship to stereotypical and monolithic blackness by offering very funny advice about such topics as 'How to Be the Black Friend,' 'How to Speak for All Black People' and 'How to Be the Black Employee'" but said that Thurston was at his best when describing his troubled upbringing in which his father was murdered, forcing his mother to raise him alone as well as his experiences at Sidwell Friends School and Harvard University.

== See also ==
- Stuff White People Like, a book in a similar tone written by Christian Lander, who is featured in the book's afterword.
