= Peter Schjeldahl =

American art critic, poet, and educator (1942–2022)

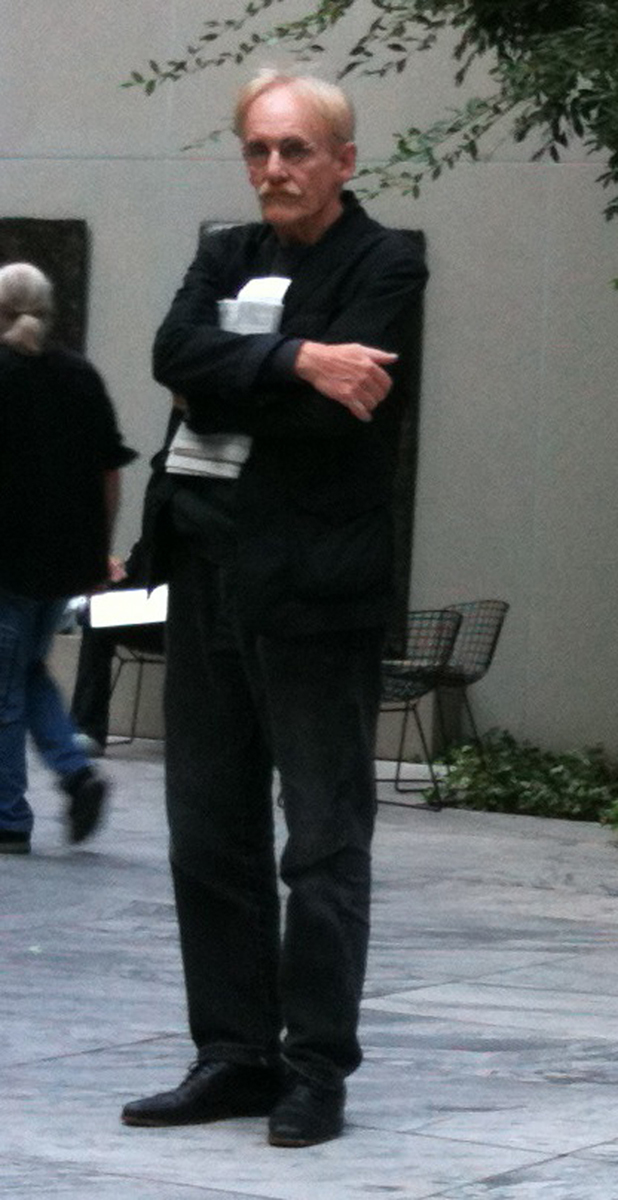
- Schjeldahl at MoMA in 2009
- Born: March 20, 1942; Fargo, North Dakota, U.S.
- Died: October 21, 2022 (aged 80); Bovina, New York, U.S.
- Education: Carleton College; The New School
- Occupations: Poet, art critic
- Children: Ada Calhoun

Peter Charles Schjeldahl (/ˈʃɛldɑːl/; March 20, 1942 – October 21, 2022) was an American art critic, poet, and educator. He was noted for being the head art critic at The New Yorker, having earlier written for The Village Voice, ARTnews, and The New York Times.

== Early life and education ==
Schjeldahl was born in Fargo, North Dakota, on March 20, 1942. His father, Gilmore, was the inventor of the airsickness bag, and whose company produced NASA’s first communications satellite; his mother, Charlene (Hanson), was Gilmore's office manager. Schjeldahl was raised in small towns throughout his home state and Minnesota. He studied at Carleton College from 1962 to 1964, and at The New School. He began his professional writing career as a reporter in 1962 at The Jersey Journal, in Jersey City, and in Minnesota and Iowa.

== Art critic ==
Schjeldahl traveled to Paris in 1964 and remained there for a year before settling in New York City in 1965. Upon moving to New York he worked as an art critic for ARTnews, The New York Times, The Village Voice (1990 to 1998), and 7 Days (The Cooper Union). In 1998 he joined The New Yorker where he was the head art critic. His writings also appeared in Artforum, Art in America, The New York Times Magazine, Vogue, and Vanity Fair. During his career, Schjeldahl wrote several books of poetry as well as art criticism. He published his final book, Hot, Cold, Heavy, Light: 100 Art Writings, 1988–2018, in June 2019. He also taught at Harvard University in the Department of Visual and Environmental Studies for four years during the late 1990s and early 2000s.

== Poet ==
Schjeldahl's poetry falls in line with many of the characteristic themes and styles of the New York School. As a contemporary postmodern poet, Schjeldahl believed that poetry should be enjoyed and understood by all readers. In an interview with the Virginia Commonwealth University's Blackbird, Schjeldahl commented on how "there are no rewards in being obscure or abstruse or overbearing."

Schjeldahl's poetry often addresses common experiences or familiar events. His poem “My Generation” opens: "Vietnam/ Drugs/ Civil Rights/ Rock/ Watergate/ (in that order?)/ Are the blows of history/ That have left my generation/ Its peculiar battered silhouette." In an interview with Blackbird, Schjeldahl stated that "writing things that people want to read is my bread and butter."

== Awards ==
Schjeldahl was awarded a Guggenheim fellowship in 1995. In 1980 he received the Frank Jewett Mather Award for art criticism by the College Art Association. The Sterling and Francine Clark Art Institute named Peter Schjeldahl the winner of the 2008 Clark Prize for Excellence in Arts Writing. The prize was established in 2006 to recognize writers who advance public appreciation of visual art in a way that "is grounded in scholarship yet appeals to a broad range of audiences." It comes with a $25,000 honorarium and an award designed by architect Tadao Ando.

Carleton College bestowed an honorary degree, a Doctor of Humane Letters, honoris causa, to Schjeldahl as part of their commencement exercises on June 13, 2015. Seven years later, he was nominated for the Pulitzer Prize for Criticism, "for accessible and dedicated art criticism that introduces or revisits painters, institutions and movements, offering tender appreciations and unflinching dissents".

== Personal life ==
Schjeldahl married and later divorced a woman whom he publicly referred to as "L." He lived in New York City. He was married to Donnie Brooke Alderson, a former actress, until his death. Together, they had one child, Ada Calhoun Schjeldahl, who writes under the name Ada Calhoun.

In 2019, Schjeldahl was diagnosed with lung cancer. He died on October 21, 2022, at his home in Bovina, New York. He was 80 years old.
