= Andrea Syrtash =

Canadian-American relationship writer and broadcaster

- Born: Toronto, Ontario, Canada
- Education: Queen's University; Ryerson Polytechnic University
- Occupations: Dating and relationship writer
- Spouse: Michael
- Website: pregnantish.com

Andrea Syrtash is a New-York based dating and relationship writer, online broadcaster, author, and founder of Pregnantish, a media platform for people experiencing infertility.

== Author ==
Syrtash contributed to a number of titles published by Hundreds of Heads Books and served as the Special Editor of How to Survive the Real World (2006) and How to Survive Your In-Laws. She is the author of He's Just Not Your Type (And That's a Good Thing) (Rodale Books, 2010) and Cheat On Your Husband (With Your Husband) (Rodale Books, 2011). She is the co-author of It's Okay to Sleep with Him on the First Date (Harlequin Non-Fiction, July 2013).

== On-air personality ==
Syrtash hosted ON Dating, produced by NBC Universal Digital Studios at 30 Rockefeller Center in New York City. She is the host of Love and Sex Videos for NBC iVillage and the co-host of Life Story Project for OWN: The Oprah Winfrey Network (Canada).

She frequently appears in the media as a relationship expert source on shows including The View, The Today Show, CBS This Morning, CNN Headline News, On-Air with Ryan Seacrest, and on VH1.

== Spokesperson and speaker ==
Syrtash has been a spokesperson and speaker for lifestyle brands including MSN Living, Schick Quattro for Women, and Movado.

== Personal life ==
Syrtash grew up in Toronto, Ontario, Canada. She lives in Brooklyn, NY with her husband Michael.
