= Pilancones =

Natural park in San Bartolomé de Tirajana, Gran Canaria, Spain

Pilancones Natural Park
- IUCN category Ib (wilderness area)
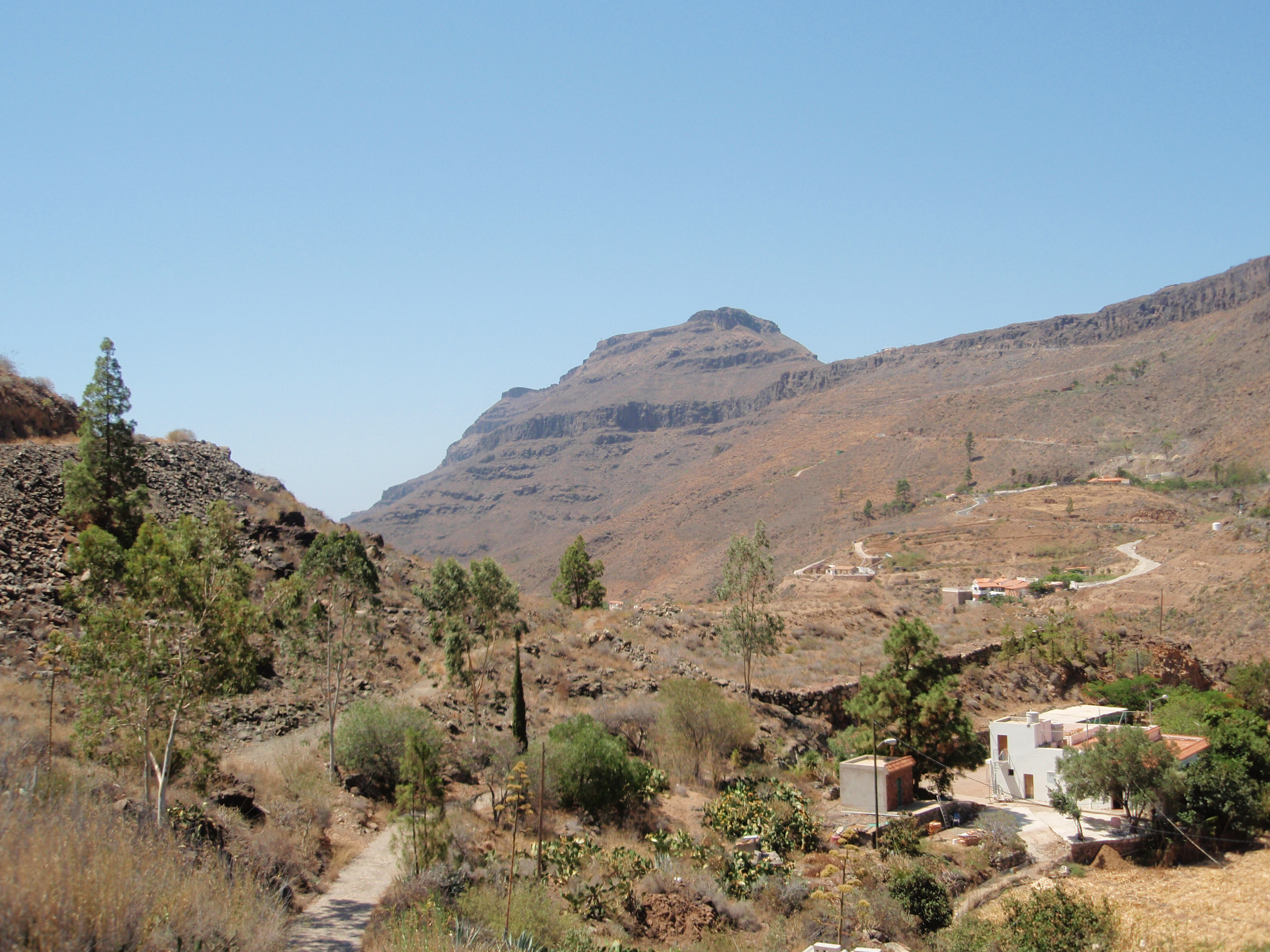
- Ayagaures's Canyon
- Interactive map of Pilancones Natural Park
- Location: Gran Canaria
- Coordinates: 27°52′12″N 15°37′48″W
- Area: 14,317 acres (5,794 ha)
- Established: 1987

Location of the Canary Islands in the Atlantic Ocean

Pilancones Natural Park is located in San Bartolomé de Tirajana municipality on the island of Gran Canaria, Spain. Its area is 5794.4 ha. It adjoins Roque Nublo country park to the north, and Fataga protected area to the east. The park plays an important role in soil protection and the replenishment of an aquifer, along which there are several ravines running southward which are of geomorphological interest and landscape value. The pine forests on hilltops are a well-preserved habitat with abundant bird life. The park also harbours several varieties of cactus and spurge, and a number of aquatic habitats. The park takes its name from natural pools, formerly known locally as pilancones, which remain after the runoff of water. Throughout the area there are threatened animal and plant species, and features of scientific interest.

== Designations ==
The space was named as Parque Natural (Natural Park) de Ayagaures y Pilancones in 1987 and classified in 1994 as parque natural. Within the park are open-country areas (montes) accessible to the public: “Ayagaures y Pilancones”, and the public amenity areas of "La Plata, San Bartolomé y Maspalomas" and "Montaña del Rey". It has also been declared an ecologically sensitive area and a zone of special protection for birds under an EU directive.

== The Pino de Pilancones pine tree ==
Within the park stood the so-called Pino de Pilancones (Pilancones pine tree), of the Pinus canariensis variety, which was destroyed in a storm that struck Gran Canaria in 2008. Over 500 years old and 30-40m in height, it had been ranked among the hundred most notable trees of Spain. Its death was inevitable after the fires that ravaged part of the centre of the island in summer 2007. The dendrochronologist M. Génova (with C. Santana and B. Martínez), studying growth patterns of a specimen of this tree sent to Universidad Politécnica de Madrid in 2009, found an average age of 542 years, the oldest known age for any Canarian pine. To this period was added an estimated 8 years to reach the height from which the specimen was taken. In this way the Pino de Pilancones has been dated to around the winter of 1457-1458, at the end of the medieval period.
