= Monk and Nun =

Style of roof tiling using arched tiles in both layers

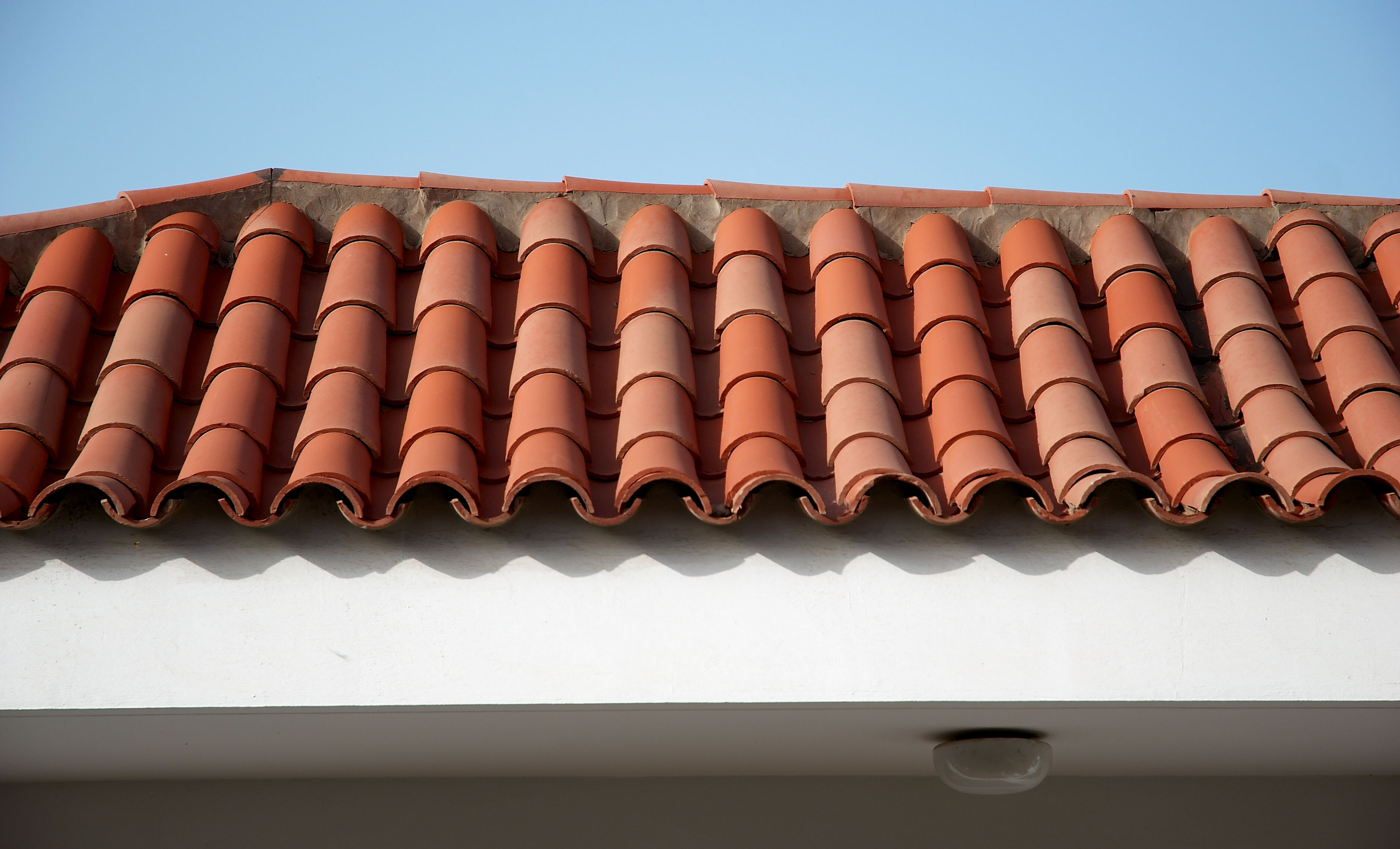
New roof section, San Agustin, Gran Canaria

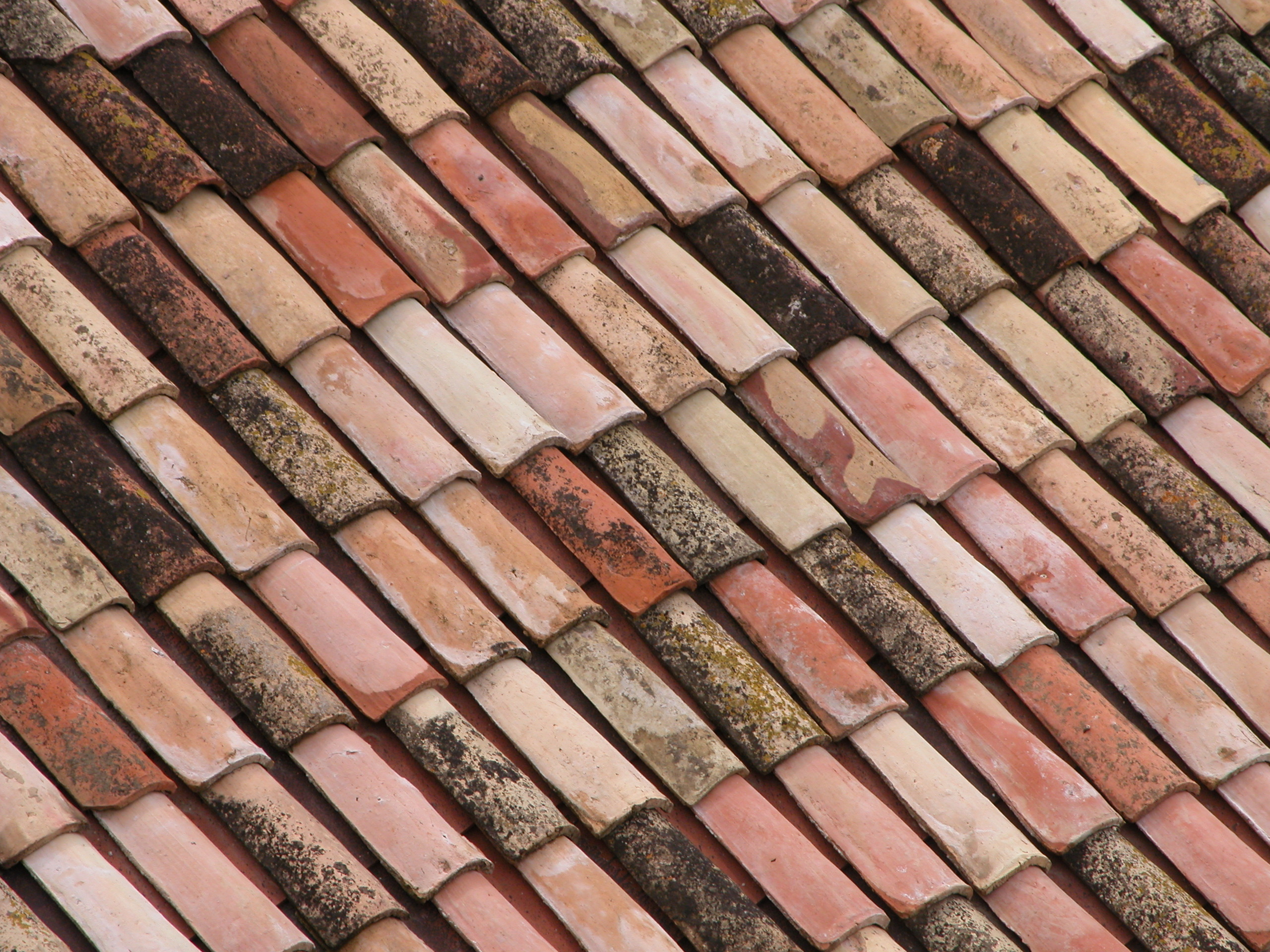
Mission tile in Spain

Monk and Nun, also known as pan and cover, mission tiling, Spanish tile, gutter tile, or barrel tile, is a style of arranging roof tiles, using semi-cylindrical tiles similar to imbrex and tegula, but instead of alternating rows of flat tiles (tegulae) and arched tiles (imbrices), both rows consist of the arched tile. The top row with the convex side facing up are the monk tiles while the bottom row with the convex side facing down are the nun tiles. Mortar is often used under the monk tile to firmly attach it to the nun tile, though this can lead to failure in areas with cold winters.

Roofs with terracotta Monk and Nun started appearing in Southern Europe during the Middle Ages. Originally, the tiles were made from locally sourced clay and given its shape with the help of a curved surface, such as a log or the maker's thigh. With time, regions developed a preference for a specific tile size, curve shape (profile), and color or colors.

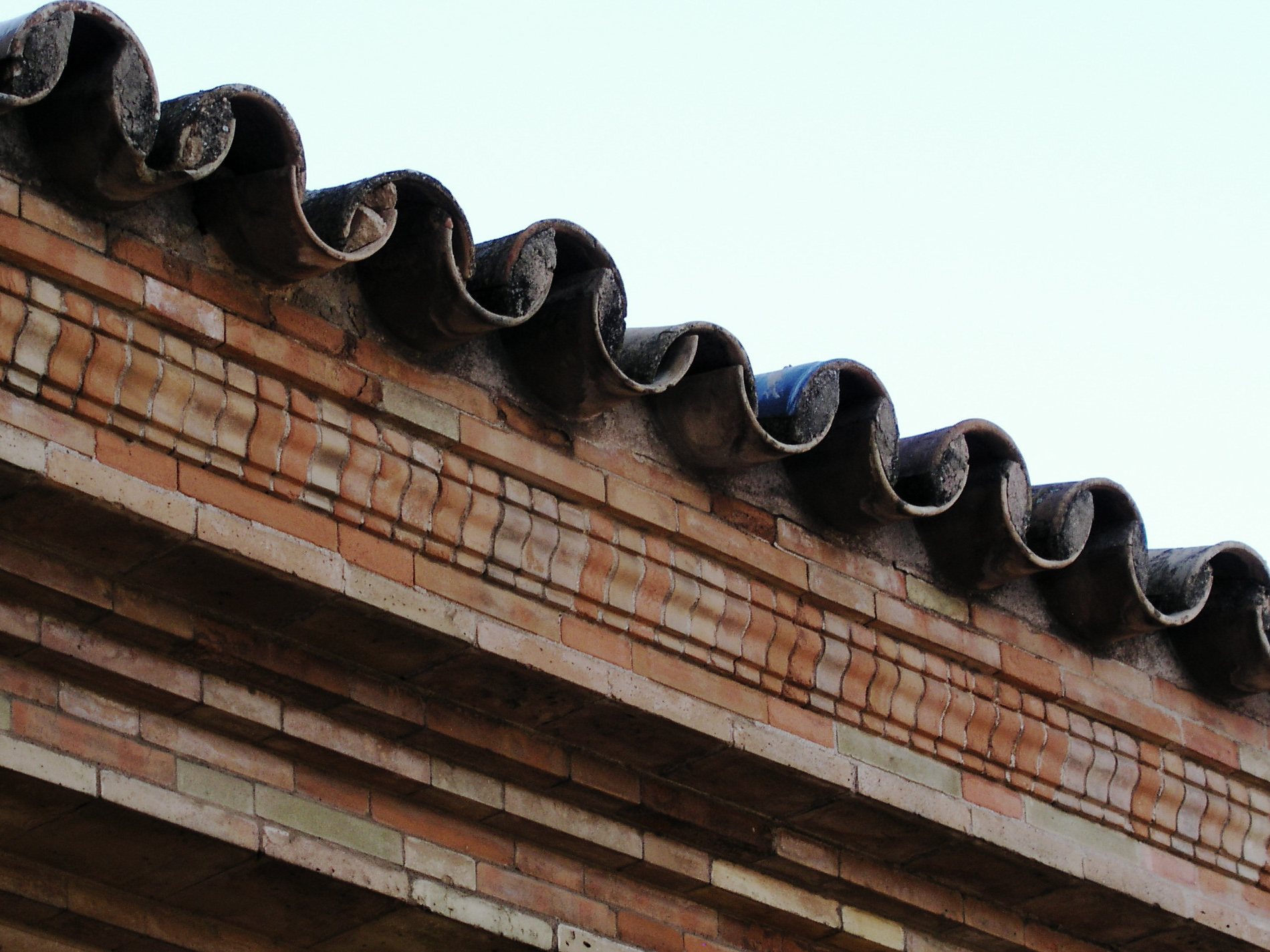
Roof edge, Plaza de España, Seville, Spain

Today, Monk and Nun tiles are mass-produced from clay, metal, concrete, or composite materials in various dimensions, profiles, and colors, including colors beyond the traditional red to brown palette.

== Geographic distribution ==
Monk and Nun is one of Europe's historical roof tiles traditionally found in countries along or near the Mediterranean Sea: Portugal, Spain, France, Italy, Slovenia, Croatia, Montenegro, Albania, Greece, and European Turkey. The tile's exact areas of adoption within these countries largely coincide with regions where low-pitched roofs (rather than high-pitched roofs or flat roofs) are part of the regional style of architecture.

Beyond Europe, Monk and Nun roofs can be found in former colonies of the Spanish Empire, including Latin America, areas of the United States that were once part of the Spanish Empire, and the Philippines. It can also be found in regions with close contact with southern Europe, including Turkey and Morocco.

Roofs with Monk and Nun (or Roman tiles resembling them) are especially prevalent in Spain, Italy, southern France, and coastal Croatia, since most of the houses and many of the residential buildings constructed throughout the 20th century in these countries were built with a regional-looking roof instead of the increasingly popular flat roof.

=== Spain ===
Monk and Nun is the most common type of roof tile in the interior and northern regions of mainland Spain, except in certain mountainous (mostly small or rural) communities where either stone slab or slate roofs are the tradition. It is less common in the southeastern provinces of Alicante, Murcia and Almería, where tiled low-pitched roofs give way to the flat roof terraces that suits the local semi-arid and arid climates.

=== Italy ===
In the north of the country, Monk and Nun is the most popular type of roof tile throughout the extensive Po Plain and neighboring Venetian Plain. It is rare however in the most northern communes that constitute the Italian Alps, and in a small stretch of Liguria that favors the local slate.

While Imbrex and tegula roofs remain very common in central Italy, Monk and Nun roofs typically co-exist among them.

Monk and Nun roofs are also prevalent in southern Italy, except in a few areas where traditional flat roofs dominate the architectural landscape, such as Apulia, the Amalfi Coast, the islands of the Gulf of Naples, and the western end of Sicily.

=== France ===
The tile's area of adoption extends throughout much of mainland France's southern half (except mainly in the Alps, Massif Central, and Pyrenees, since steep roofs in those higher elevations have historically favored stone slabs, slate tiles, or flat clay tiles), and includes all of Corsica, except Cap Corse.

Monk and Nun roofs can also be found in isolation in an area straddling Lorraine and Champagne. Otherwise, it is absent in northern regions of the country, where traditional architecture adheres to steep roofs and mansards covered with slate tiles, pantiles, or flat clay tiles.

=== Greece ===
With the exception of islands in the South Aegean with traditional flat roofs and mountainous communities where roofs are predominantly made of stone, Monk and Nun's historical area of adoption within Greece is extensive. However, the post-WW2 construction boom in Greece produced a majority of residential structures with flat roofs in numerous cities and suburbs. At the same time, many Monk and Nun roof restorations carried out throughout the 20th century were done with the increasingly popular Marseille tile.

=== Beyond Europe ===
==== North Africa and Anatolia ====
Monk and Nun can be found in a few non-desert areas of Morocco, as well as the Aegean-Mediterranean coast of Turkey. In Morocco however, where the majority of structures have flat roofs, the use of Monk and Nun is mostly limited to small roof awnings or overhangs above doors, windows, balconies, or arcades.

==== The Americas ====
This type of roof tile is also typical of Spanish and Portuguese colonial architecture in certain regions of Latin America, particularly in historic quarters and rural estates. Classic Monk and Nun tiles can also be seen in historic Spanish-style buildings and houses in the U.S. states of California, Texas, and Florida, where it is commonly known as Spanish tile or Mission tile.

==== The Philippines ====
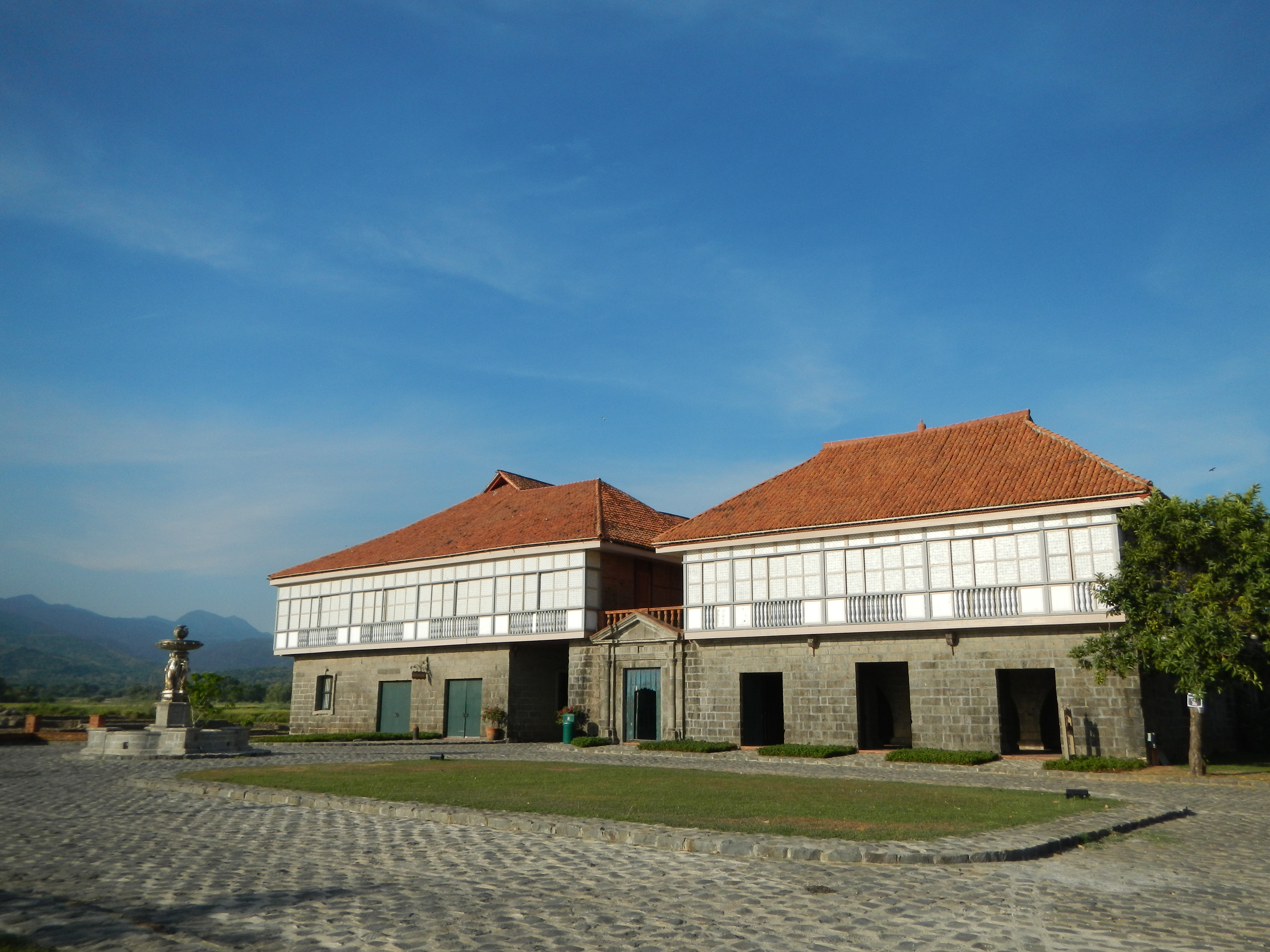
Traditional bahay na bato houses with Monk and Nun roofing in the Las Casas Filipinas de Acuzar, Philippines

This type of roof tile was known as teja de curva in the Spanish colonial period of the Philippines. It was commonly used for the colonial-era bahay na bato architecture (which mixes native and Spanish architecture).

A similar native roofing technique in the Philippines is known as kalaka which uses halved bamboo sections fitted together in the same manner as Monk and Nun.

== Modern alternatives ==
Interlocking roofing products that aim to resemble Monk and Nun are widely available in the market, often with the name S-Tile or Roman tile. Each piece is essentially the union of a monk tile and a nun tile. As a more economical and easier-to-install alternative, these interlocking tiles have become common in Europe and America, especially in new constructions and roof restorations outside of historic quarters.

Throughout Europe, the mass-produced Marseille tile (also known as French tile) has also been gaining ground in traditional Monk and Nun territory since the beginning of the 20th century, further contributing to the decline in popularity of the original Monk and Nun tile.

== Gallery ==
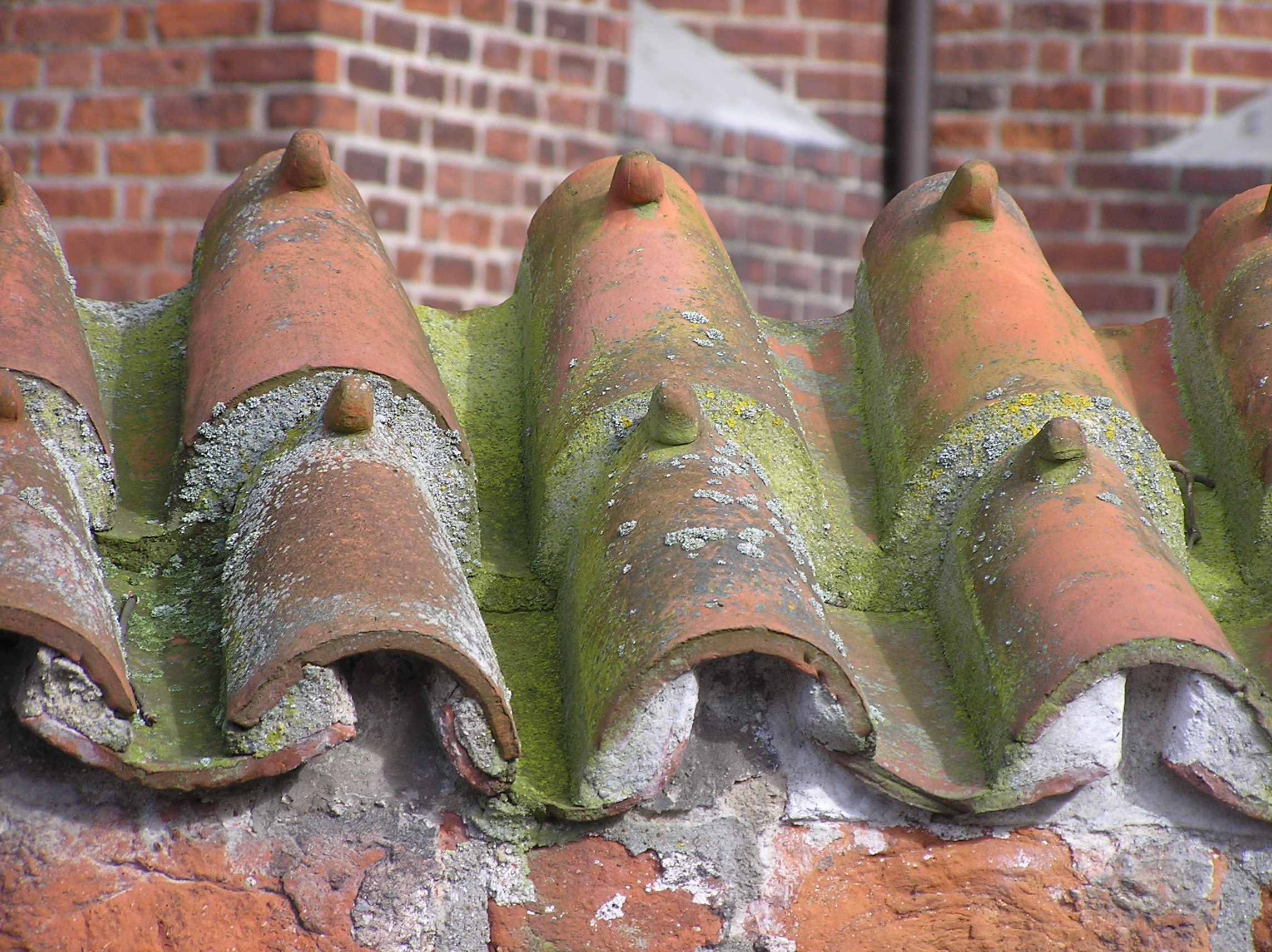
Another form of Monk and Nun roofing on a church in Kalundborg

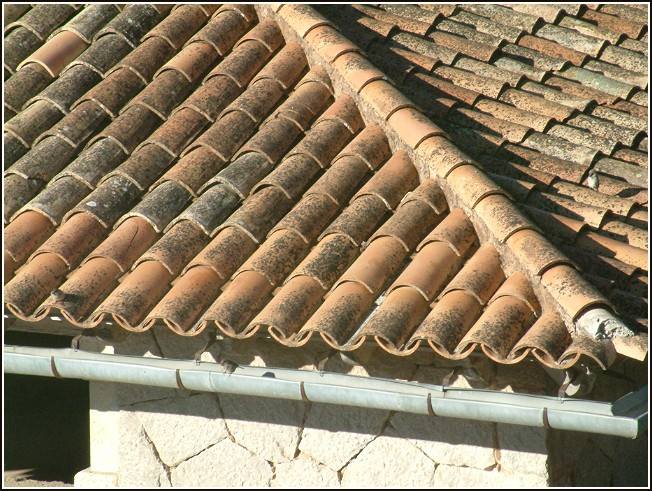
A roof of Monk and Nun tiles
