= San Bartolomé de Tirajana =

- Municipality
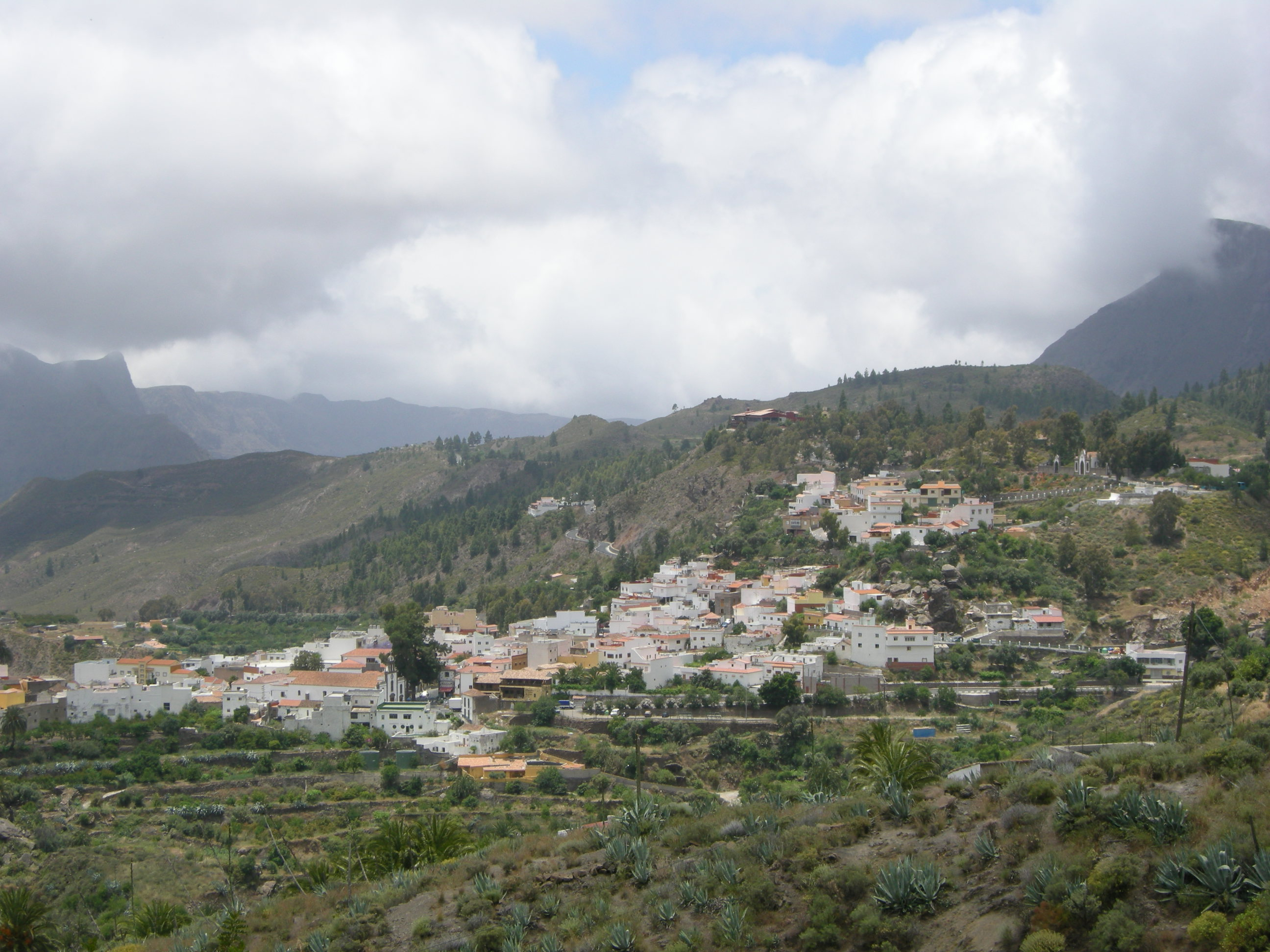
- San Bartolomé de Tirajana

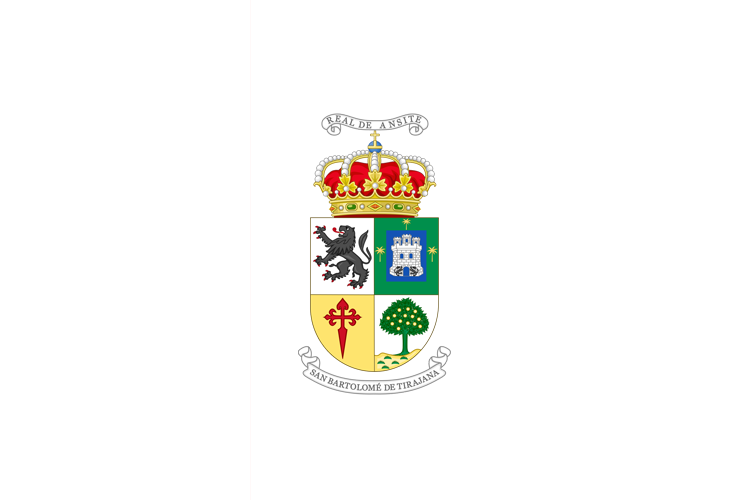
- Flag Coat of arms

- Municipal location in Gran Canaria

- Location in the province of Las Palmas San Bartolomé de Tirajana (Canary Islands) San Bartolomé de Tirajana (Spain, Canary Islands)
- Coordinates: 27°55′32″N 15°34′21″W
- Country: Spain
- Autonomous Community: Canary Islands
- Province: Las Palmas
- Island: Gran Canaria

Government
  - Mayor: Marco Aurelio Pérez Sánchez (Agrupación de Vecinos de San Bartolomé de Tirajana)

Area
  - Total: 333.13 km^{2} (128.62 sq mi)

Population (2025-01-01)
  - Total: 54,291
  - Density: 162.97/km^{2} (422.10/sq mi)
- Time zone: UTC+0 (CET)
  - Summer (DST): UTC+1 (CEST (GMT +1))
- Postal code: 35290
- Area code(s): 928 & 828
- Website: www.maspalomas.com

San Bartolomé de Tirajana is a village and a Spanish municipality in the south-western part of the island of Gran Canaria in the Las Palmas province in the Canary Islands. With an area of 333.13 km^{2} (128.62 sq mi), San Bartolomé de Tirajana is the largest municipality in area on the island as well as the Canary Islands. The population is 56,698 (2013).

The municipality contains the large beach resorts of Maspalomas, including Playa del Inglés and San Agustín, and the Pilancones natural park. The municipal capital, the village of San Bartolomé de Tirajana is situated in the mountains, 17 km (11 mi) from the coast and 27 km (17 mi) south-west of Las Palmas, at about 900 m (2,953 ft) elevation. Most of the population lives along the Atlantic coastline. The GC-1 motorway passes through the southern part of the municipality, and connects it with Las Palmas de Gran Canaria and the Gran Canaria Airport.

== Location ==
Located in the south of the island, 54.5 kilometers from the island's capital, the municipality has a triangular shape with a vertex in the interior and a wide base that covers a good part of the southern coast of Gran Canaria.

With an area of 333.13 km², it is the largest municipality on the island, covering more than a fifth of the island's surface area.

The municipal capital, the rural nucleus of Tunte, is located at 850 meters above sea level, reaching the maximum municipal level at 1,957.3 meters above sea level at the elevation known as Morro de la Agujereada.

== History ==
The territory of San Bartolomé de Tirajana was historically part of the aboriginal Guanche kingdom of Gáldar. The area contains archaeological remains of indigenous communities, particularly in the valleys of Fataga and Ayagaures. Following the Castilian conquest in the 15th century, the settlement of Tunte emerged as an agricultural center. The parish of San Bartolomé was established in the 16th century, becoming the religious nucleus around which the current village developed.

== Orography ==
The centre of the coast of the municipality is characterised by its long and wide golden sand beaches, as well as the dune field of Maspalomas and its brackish water pool. The northern end of the coast is, on the contrary, rocky, and the southern end is cliff.

Above the coast there is a wide, fully developed coastal plain, which gradually rises up and, furrowed by deep ravines, heads towards the mountains in the centre of the island.

Evolution of urban land, according to the Cadastre (2010 data): urban land in 2006: 1586 hectares; urban land in 2007: 1612 hectares; urban land in 2008: 1635 hectares; urban land in 2009: 1649 hectares; urban land in 2010: 1657 hectares, representing 5.2% of the total land of the municipality.

== Climate ==
The weather conditions are given by the leeward position of the island and, therefore, to the protection of the humid winds of the northeast. This results in low and concentrated rainfall in the winter months and pleasant temperatures almost all year round.

The average annual temperature is 15,8 °C, with January being the coldest month at 12,1 °C and August the hottest at 20,5 °C. As for rainfall, the average is 307 mm per year.

This justifies the fact that the high tourist season extends from September-October to April, the time of year when the mild temperatures make the island a destination for European tourism.

== Nature ==
=== Protected areas ===
The municipality has a large part of its surface area included in the Canary Islands Network of Natural Protected Areas. The Riscos de Tirajana Natural Monument, the Pilancones Natural Park, the Fataga Protected Landscape, the Maspalomas Dunes Special Nature Reserve and the Juncalillo del Sur Site of Scientific Interest are all within its boundaries. In addition, it shares with the neighbouring municipalities the Nublo Rural Park and the Los Marteles Special Nature Reserve.

All these areas are also included in the Natura 2000 Network as Special Areas of Conservation - SACs, to which the Amurga and Taurus massifs are added, as well as the coastal strip from the tip of Tarajalillo to that of Maspalomas due to the existence of underwater tallow meadows known as sebadales. The surface of the protected landscape of Fataga, Pilancones and the rural park of El Nublo are also Special Protection Areas for Birds -SPA-.

The municipality also has the public utility mountains of San Bartolome, La Plata and Maspalomas, as well as Montaña del Rey.

== Cultural heritage ==
The municipality contains several sites listed in the cultural heritage registers. The Church of San Bartolomé Apóstol in Tunte, originally built in the 16th century, is declared a Bien de Interés Cultural (Asset of Cultural Interest). The area also contains pre-Hispanic archaeological sites, such as the Necropolis of Arteara, and traditional rural architecture in the Fataga valley, which is included in protected landscape designations.

== Economy ==
Tourism is the single source of income of the coastal area, while upwards, there is cooler weather, fertile land and agricultural activity.

The coastal tourist resorts, primarily Maspalomas and Playa del Inglés, constitute the primary economic driver of the municipality, accounting for the majority of local employment in the service and hospitality sectors. In the northern and interior zones, economic activity remains focused on traditional agriculture, including the cultivation of tomatoes, potatoes, and tropical fruits, alongside livestock farming. Rustic land (29,615 hectares), divided into 9,369 cadastral plots: pasture and uncultivated land 85.90%; slow-growing timber species 9.5%; irrigated land 2.3%; fruit trees 1.1%; dry farming 1%. (Source: Cadastre, 2009)

Tourism, the main economic activity in the municipality, is currently in a phase of adaptation. Different studies and organized plans that attend to the current demand and elaborated with the participation of different institutions such as the ULPGC, City Hall, Cabildo and the Government of the Canary Islands, are being put into practice in order to highlight the identity of the municipality and its innumerable values.

They also attend to the modernization of the accommodation plant that, being a pioneer municipality at a tourist level, shows in its urban structure the passage of time, trying to preserve the artistic or heritage value and replacing what has become obsolete.

These plans include new buildings such as a multi-adventure theme park and a high performance sports centre linked to the world of motor sports in Punta de Tarajalillo. Also in Punta de Tarajalillo, the creation of the Wake Park Feliz theme park, dedicated mainly to the offer of water sports.

== Historical population ==
Historical population

Year	Pop.	±%
1991	24,451	—
1996	35,443	+45.0%
2001	34,515	−2.6%
2002	43,403	+25.8%

Year	Pop.	±%
2003	45,559	+5.0%
2004	44,115	−3.2%
2013	56,698	+28.5%

== Settlements ==
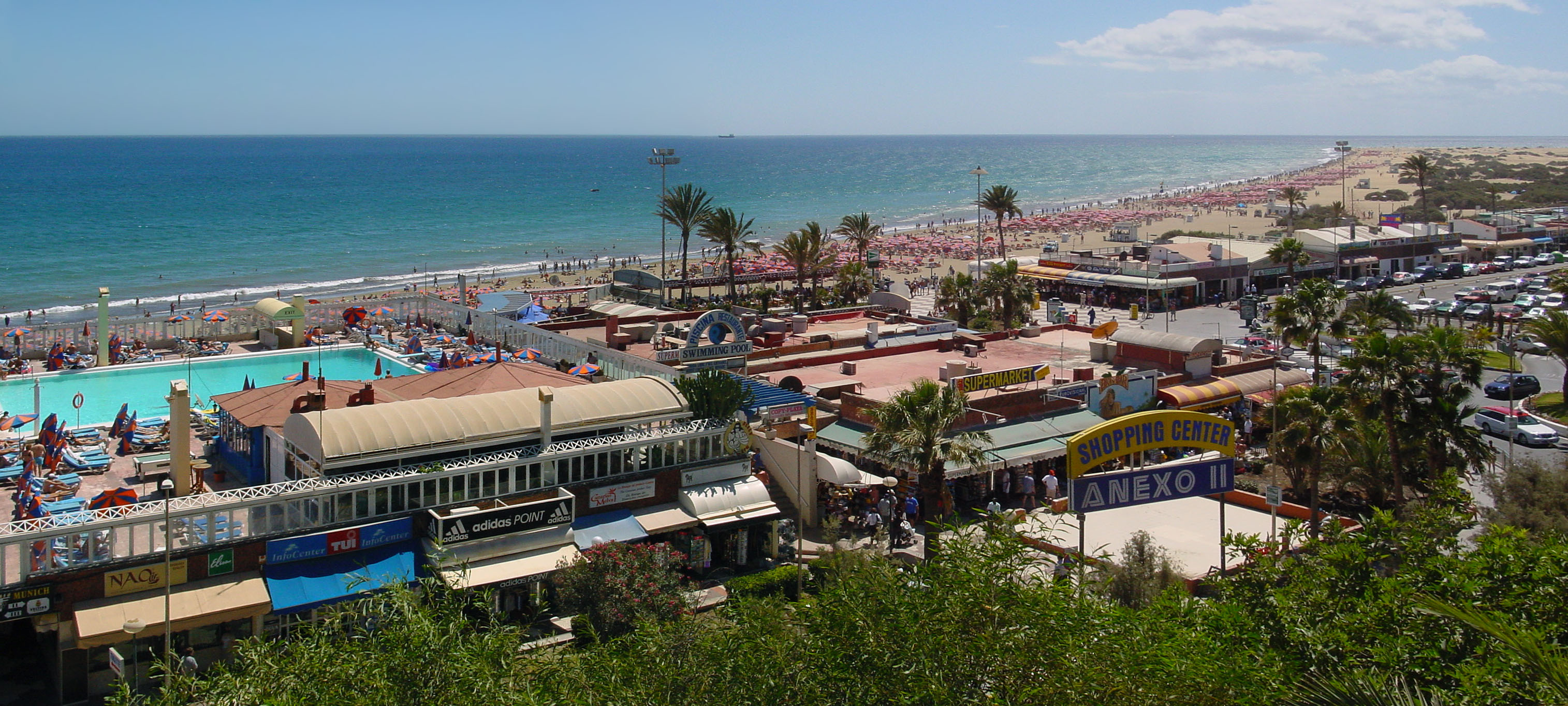
Playa del Inglés, the beach

A

- Agualatente
- Aldea Blanca
- Arteara
- Ayacata
- Ayagaures

B

- Bahia Feliz
- Berriel

C

- Calderin
- Campo Internacional
- El Canalizo
- Casas Blancas
- Los Caserones de Fataga
- Castillo del Romeral
- Los Cercados
- Cercados de Araña
- Cercados de Espino
- Chira
- Ciudad de Lima
- La Culata

F

- Fataga
- Las Filipinas
- La Florida

H

- Hoya Gercia
- Hoya Grande
- Hoya de Tunte
- Los Hortigones
- Huesa Bermeja
- La Humbria

J

- Juan Grande

L

- Lomito de Taidía
- Lomo de la Palma

M

- Maspalomas
- El Matorral
- Media Fanega
- Los Meloneras
- La Mimbre
- La Montaña
- Montaña La Data
- Montaña de Rosiana
- Monteleon
- El Moral

P

- El Pajar
- Los Palmitos
- Pasito Blanco
- Pedrazo
- Perera
- La Plata
- Playa del Aguila
- Playa del Inglés

R

- Risco Blanco
- Risco la Candelilla
- Los Rodeos

S

- El Salobre
- San Agustín
- San Fernando
- Santa Águeda
- El Sequero
- Los Sitios
- Sonnenland

T

- El Tablero
- Taidía
- Tarajalillo
- Las Tederas
- Trejo
- Tunte (San Bartolomé de Tirajana)
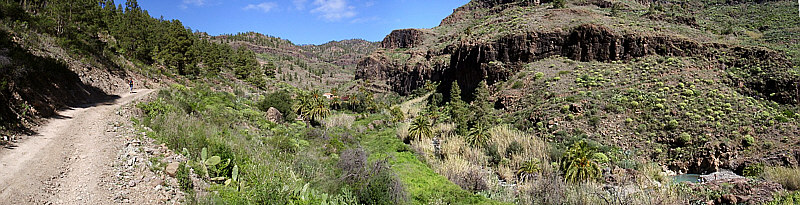
Barranco de Ayagaures

== Education ==
The British School of Gran Canaria maintains its South Campus in this municipality.

== Climate ==
It is located on the leeward portion of the island. Humid winds cover the northeast in the summer months. Precipitation is lower than the northern part of the island and temperatures are slightly higher than in the north all year round.

== Sister cities ==
- Alajuela, Costa Rica
- Elche, Spain
- Segovia, Spain

== See also ==
- List of municipalities in Las Palmas
