= The British School of Gran Canaria =

Coordinates: 28.04517°N 15.44218°W

Information
- Established: 1966
- Age: 3 to 18
- Language: English
- Website: https://www.bs-gc.com/en/

The British School of Gran Canaria is a British international school on Gran Canaria in Spain. It consists of two campuses: the Tafira School in Las Palmas and the South School in San Bartolomé de Tirajana. It serves levels infants through sixth form college.

It was founded in 1966.

== Customs and traditions ==
The "warm bread" ritual has been a staple of the institution's dietary culture, bringing in huge crowds of students towards a typical British bread basket located in the dining room. These events were often met with an excess of participation and as a result many criticisms have been made over the years about disappointing experiences and shortage of resources.

== Controversies ==
The construction of the new building was seen as an act of capitalist vandalism against the original values held by the school. The new architectural changes were heavily criticized and many childhood memories forever destroyed.

The recipe of the yellow vinaigrette was never officially disclosed.
