= San Fernando de Maspalomas =

Coordinates: 27.77°N 15.58°W

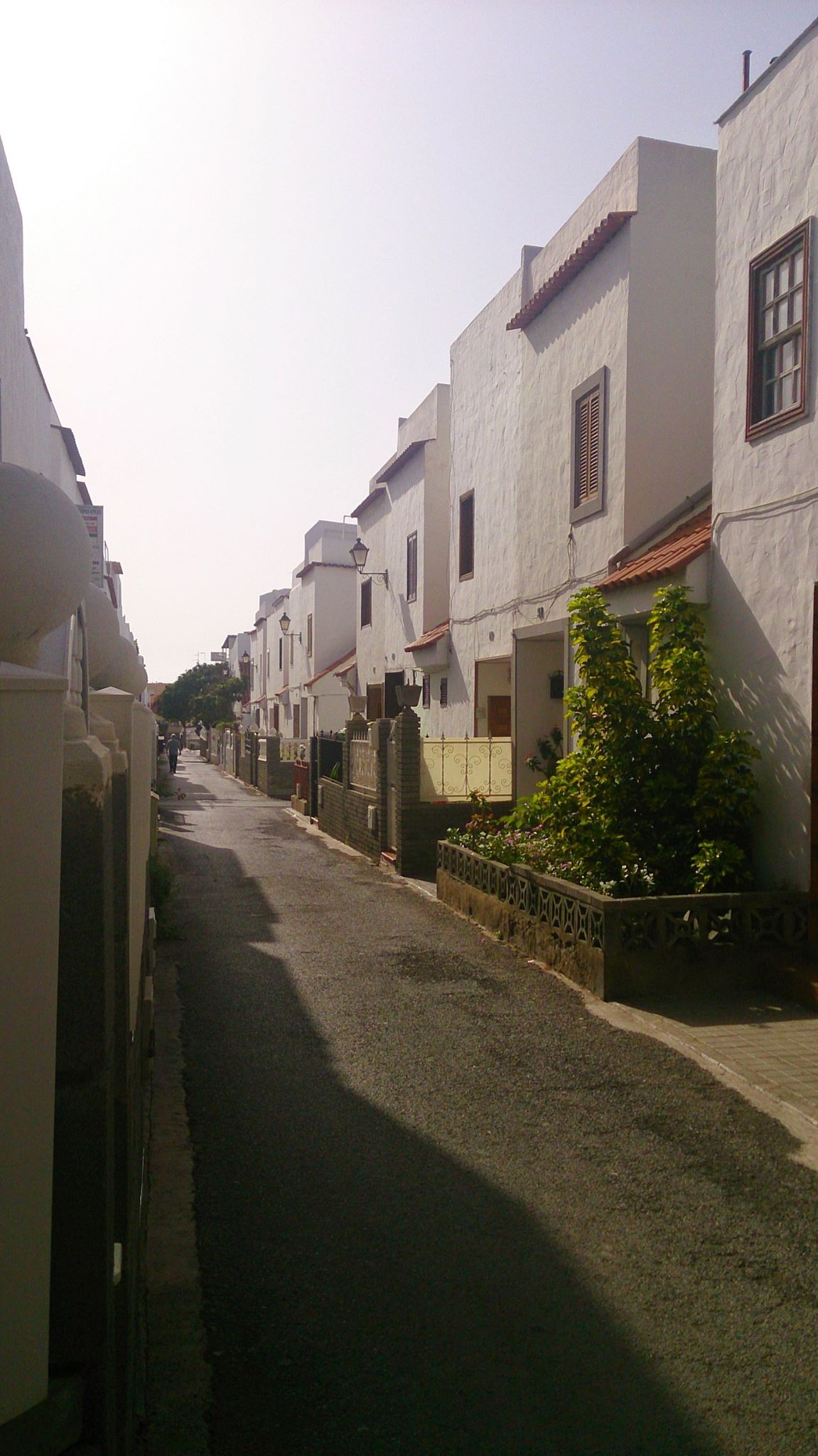
The neighborhood El Patronato

San Fernando is the northern quarter of Maspalomas in the municipality of San Bartolomé de Tirajana, Gran Canaria, and as well the name of the parish for all of Maspalomas. The patron saint San Fernando (Saint Ferdinand) was a king of Castile and famous for successful re-Christianization (the Reconquista) after the Islamic conquest of Hispania in 710.

== The quarter of San Fernando ==
The town was first built in 1961 with the name of "San Fernando de Maspalomas". The district of San Fernando was created during the 1970s for civil servants and people working in the tourist industry.

Due to its larger resident population, San Fernando has become the site for municipal service, including sport facilities, a municipal library, and a fire station. In its eastern part several large supermarkets are situated. Its school was established in 1973 with the majority of students being non-Spanish. Annually, there is a traditional pilgrimage through the quarter to San Fernando's parish church on his saint's day as a tribute to Saint Ferdinand.

=== Tourism ===
San Fernando is not the typical destination for tourists, although Playa del Inglés is within walking distance. The parochial church, a municipal market and the bi-weekly agricultural market are the main attractions. The main street Avenída de Galdar in the east of San Fernando was refurbished in 2014. The whole area was renamed Maspalomas in 1964, with locals believing this diluted the quarter's identity due to tourists getting the two confused.

== The parish of San Fernando ==
The parish of San Fernando covers the southern part of the municipality San Bartolomé de Tirajana, including all of Maspalomas, and was established in 1982.
