= Maspalomas =

- Region
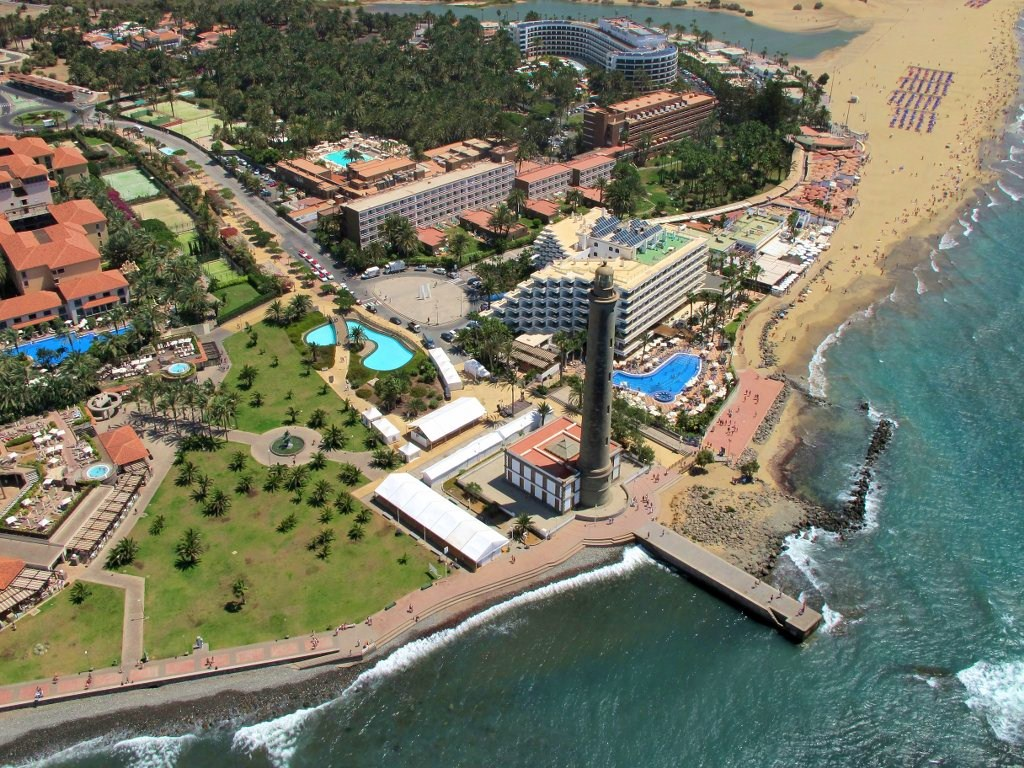
- Aerial view of Faro de Maspalomas

- Location in Canary Islands
- Coordinates: 27°46′N 15°35′W
- Country: Spain
- Autonomous community: Canary Islands
- Province: Las Palmas
- Municipality: San Bartolomé de Tirajana

Population (2013)
  - Total: 36,065
- Postal code: 35100

Maspalomas (Spanish: [maspaˈlomas]) is a tourist resort in the south of the island of Gran Canaria, Canary Islands, stretching from Bahía Feliz in the east to Meloneras in the west, including the resort towns of San Agustín, Playa del Inglés and Campo de Golf, as well as the residential areas of San Fernando, El Tablero and Sonnenland. Maspalomas constitutes the southernmost part of the municipality of San Bartolomé de Tirajana, and of the island.

== Overview ==
Before the era of tourism, Maspalomas was the name of a hamlet in what today is San Fernando de Maspalomas. Its name may derive from that of Rodrigo Mas de Palomar, a settler and soldier from Mallorca, or from Francisco Palomar, a Genoese friend of Alonso Fernandez de Lugo who purchased 87 Guanche slaves from Güímar and settled in the area.

Present-day Maspalomas is the result of an ambitious development project, organized in the form of an International Ideas Contest (opened to any member of the International Union of Architects), held in 1961 under the auspice of Alejandro del Castillo, owner and promoter of most of the space under construction. The contest was won by the French office SETAP (including the urbanist Guy Lagneau and the economist Michel Weill) and covered the 1,060 hectares (2,600 acres) and 19 kilometres (12 mi) of coast that constitute the core area of Maspalomas - Costa Canaria. The contest paved the way for a particular way of understanding "touristic" urbanism that served as a model for later tourist development in other Canary Islands.

== Tourism ==
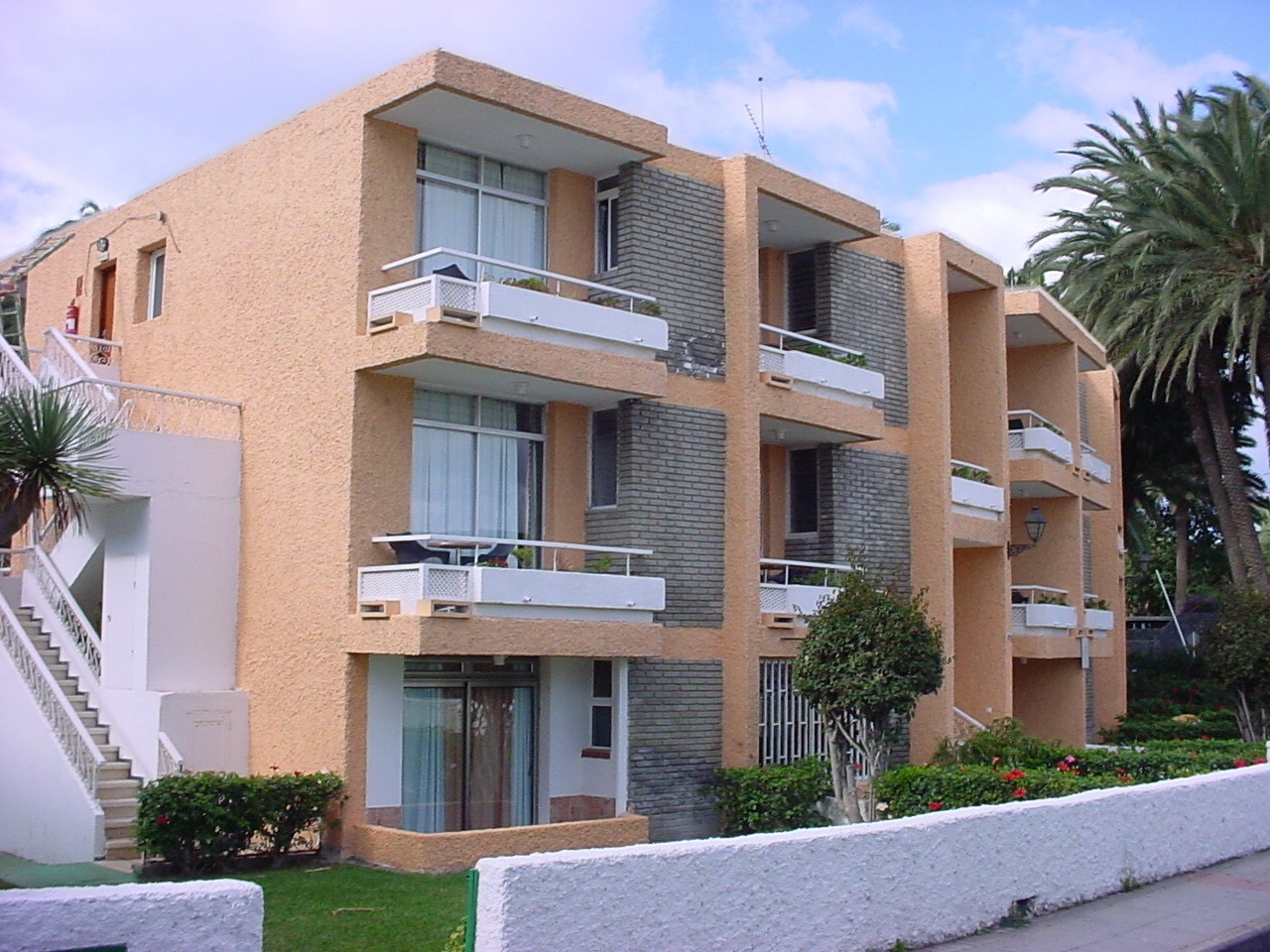
Typical tourist apartments in Maspalomas: The Oasis Maspalomas Foresta

Unlike the resort-like development model later extended to other locations in the Canary Islands and the Caribbean, Maspalomas has a personality of its own, as it evolved into a fully equipped town much closer to the "tourist" concept of destinations like Palm Springs, California or Palm Beach, Florida. It has a variety of infrastructure and public institutions rarely seen in other tourist areas, including private clinics and two hospitals, local and foreign schooling institutions (Spanish, English and Swedish schools), shopping and convention centres, two casinos, golf courses, sports centres, theme parks and a Summer University (in collaboration with the university of Las Palmas de Gran Canaria, mainly focused on tourism-related activities).

It has a wide range of accommodation on offer, although the urbanism concept speaks of an horizontal expansion (bungalows) rather than high rises. Much appreciated as a winter destination for foreign tourists, mostly from north-European countries (Sweden, Norway, Finland, Germany, Netherlands, etc.), it remains the largest tourist destination in the Canary Islands and a worldwide-known destination for LGBT tourism.

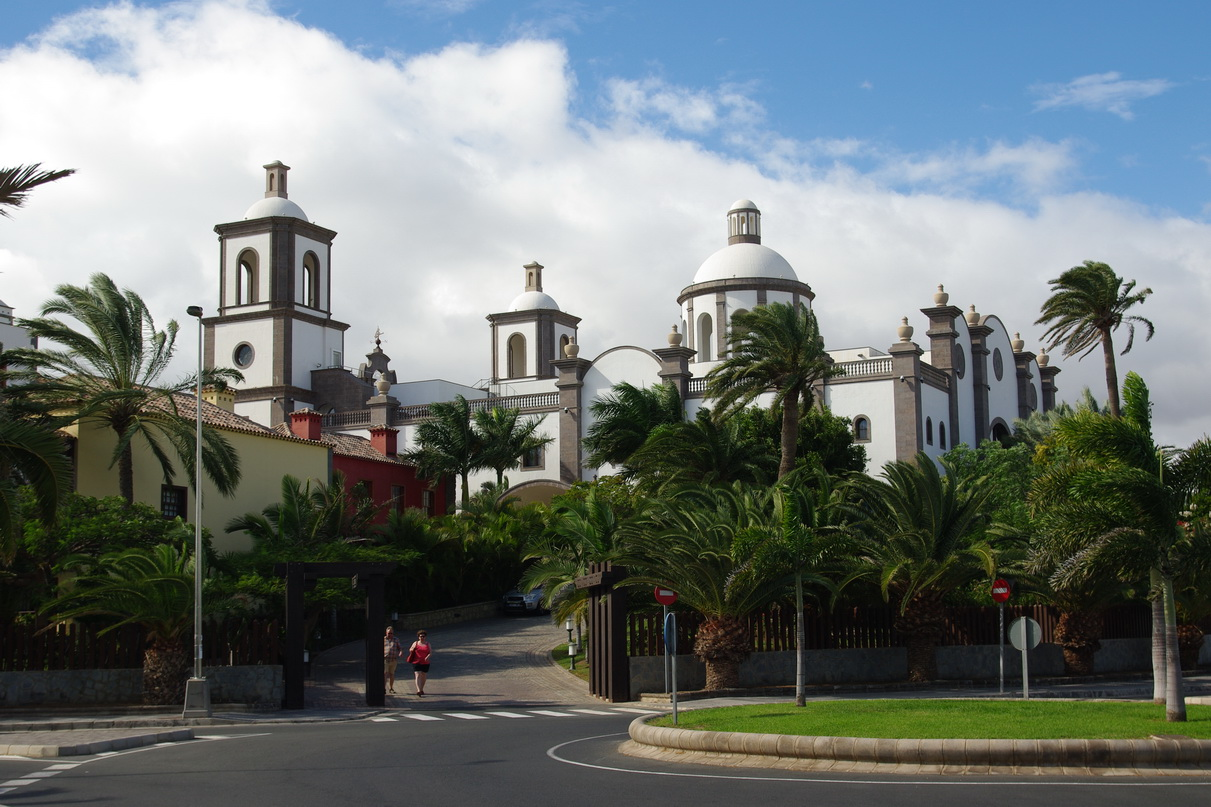
The Lopesan Villa del Conde Hotel features a replica of a church

The development of luxury hotels along the coast between Maspalomas and neighbouring Meloneras has resulted in some notable architectural developments. The Lopesan Villa del Conde and the Lopesan Costa Meloneras Hotels have both been designed in a Canarian Spanish Colonial Revival style, partly derived from de la Torre's Hotel Santa Catalina (1890) in Las Palmas. For the Villa del Conde hotel, opened in 2005, the architect created a replica of the nearby town of Agüimes (the home town of Eustasio López González, founder of the Lopesan Hotel Group), including a distinctive replica of the large, domed Church of San Sebastián, which serves as the hotel reception.

Maspalomas serves as the base for Gran Canaria's only English-language newspaper, which serves a print readership in excess of 20,000 every month and reaches up to another 30,000 readers on-line.

In September 2012, the World Tourism Organization organized its World Tourism Day in Maspalomas, as a form of commemoration of its 50 years of existence.

Maspalomas is a gay-friendly destination with many establishments catering for the LGBT community and a popular gay beach by the sand dunes. It is particularly centred around Playa del Inglés. Maspalomas Gay Pride has been described as one of the largest LGBTQ+ events in Europe and one of the top Pride festivals in the world.

== Landmarks and geography ==
The seafront at Punta de Maspalomas, the southernmost point of the resort, is dominated by a 56-metre-high (184 ft) lighthouse, El Faro de Maspalomas. Completed in 1890, it was built to guide ships travelling between Europe and the Americas.

The lighthouse overlooks the popular 12 kilometres (7.5 mi)-long Maspalomas beach. To the east of the lighthouse, the Maspalomas Dunes stretch inland all the way to Playa del Inglés. During the 1960s and 70s, the construction of hotels and the tourist resort began to encroach on the dunes, damaging the natural habitat, and in 1994 a 4 km^{2} (1.5 sq mi) area of dunes was declared a nature reserve to protect native wildlife. El Charco is a natural lagoon at the edge of the dunes which attracts many species of birds, eels and guppies.

In the north of Maspalomas San Fernando and El Tablero were built for people working in the tourist industry. In between Sonnenland was constructed, on a crest, to accommodate expats.

An array of large satellite dishes visible on a hill from Meloneras is Maspalomas Station, an ESA ground station that supported several NASA space missions, including the Mercury Program, the Gemini Program, the Apollo Moon landings, and Skylab.

== Climate ==
Maspalomas has a hot desert climate (BWh). Winters are very mild to warm and dry, with night temperatures rarely dropping below 13 °C (55 °F), while summers are hot and very dry. It is one of the places with the highest average annual temperatures in Spain, due to its extremely southern location and the influence of the Atlantic Ocean.

Climate data for Maspalomas C. Insular Turismo (2009-2025), extremes (2009-present)
Month	Jan	Feb	Mar	Apr	May	Jun	Jul	Aug	Sep	Oct	Nov	Dec	Year
Record high °C (°F)	29.3 (84.7)	29.6 (85.3)	37.2 (99.0)	37.3 (99.1)	39.4 (102.9)	36.8 (98.2)	43.6 (110.5)	45.2 (113.4)	40.0 (104.0)	38.1 (100.6)	32.8 (91.0)	29.5 (85.1)	45.2 (113.4)
Mean daily maximum °C (°F)	21.5 (70.7)	22.1 (71.8)	23.0 (73.4)	23.9 (75.0)	25.3 (77.5)	26.9 (80.4)	28.9 (84.0)	29.9 (85.8)	28.1 (82.6)	27.1 (80.8)	24.8 (76.6)	22.6 (72.7)	25.3 (77.6)
Daily mean °C (°F)	18.6 (65.5)	18.8 (65.8)	19.6 (67.3)	20.6 (69.1)	21.9 (71.4)	23.5 (74.3)	25.1 (77.2)	26.1 (79.0)	25.0 (77.0)	24.0 (75.2)	21.8 (71.2)	19.9 (67.8)	22.1 (71.7)
Mean daily minimum °C (°F)	15.6 (60.1)	15.5 (59.9)	16.1 (61.0)	17.2 (63.0)	18.4 (65.1)	20.0 (68.0)	21.3 (70.3)	22.2 (72.0)	21.8 (71.2)	20.9 (69.6)	18.8 (65.8)	17.1 (62.8)	18.7 (65.7)
Record low °C (°F)	12.0 (53.6)	11.6 (52.9)	11.1 (52.0)	14.1 (57.4)	15.3 (59.5)	16.9 (62.4)	19.0 (66.2)	19.9 (67.8)	19.7 (67.5)	17.0 (62.6)	14.8 (58.6)	13.7 (56.7)	11.1 (52.0)
Average precipitation mm (inches)	8.6 (0.34)	6.9 (0.27)	6.9 (0.27)	2.0 (0.08)	0.4 (0.02)	0.5 (0.02)	0.0 (0.0)	1.1 (0.04)	8.9 (0.35)	6.2 (0.24)	13.3 (0.52)	13.1 (0.52)	67.9 (2.67)
Average precipitation days (≥ 1 mm)	1.2	1.6	1.4	0.8	0.1	0.1	0.0	0.3	0.9	1.2	1.3	1.9	10.8
Source: Agencia Estatal de Meteorologia (AEMET OpenData)

== Transport ==
Maspalomas is served by the Faro de Maspalomas bus station run by the Gran Canaria Transport Authority, which is located near the lighthouse at the end of Avenida Cristobal Colon. Bus services operated by Global Transport provide connections to other tourist resorts and towns in the south of the island, including Playa del Inglés and Mogán, as well as to towns along the east coast and to the island capital, Las Palmas.

Plans have existed for several years to construct a rail link, called Tren de Gran Canaria, connecting Maspalomas to Gran Canaria Airport and Las Palmas. A terminus station is planned at Meloneras underneath Av. Cristóbal Colón, near the lighthouse. The scheme, estimated to cost €1,500 million, has not been confirmed due to funding problems.

== Photo gallery ==
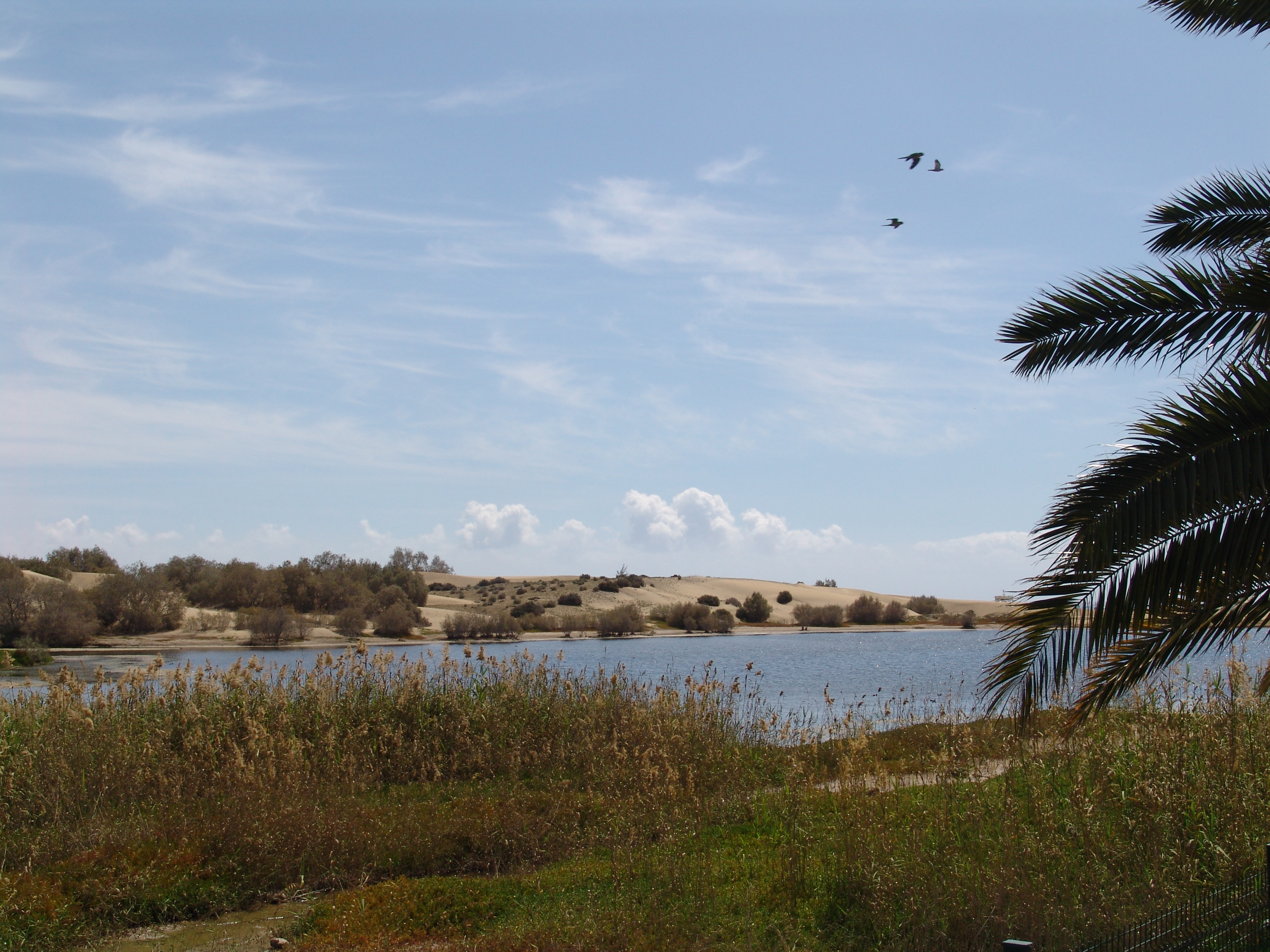
Bird sanctuary La Charca

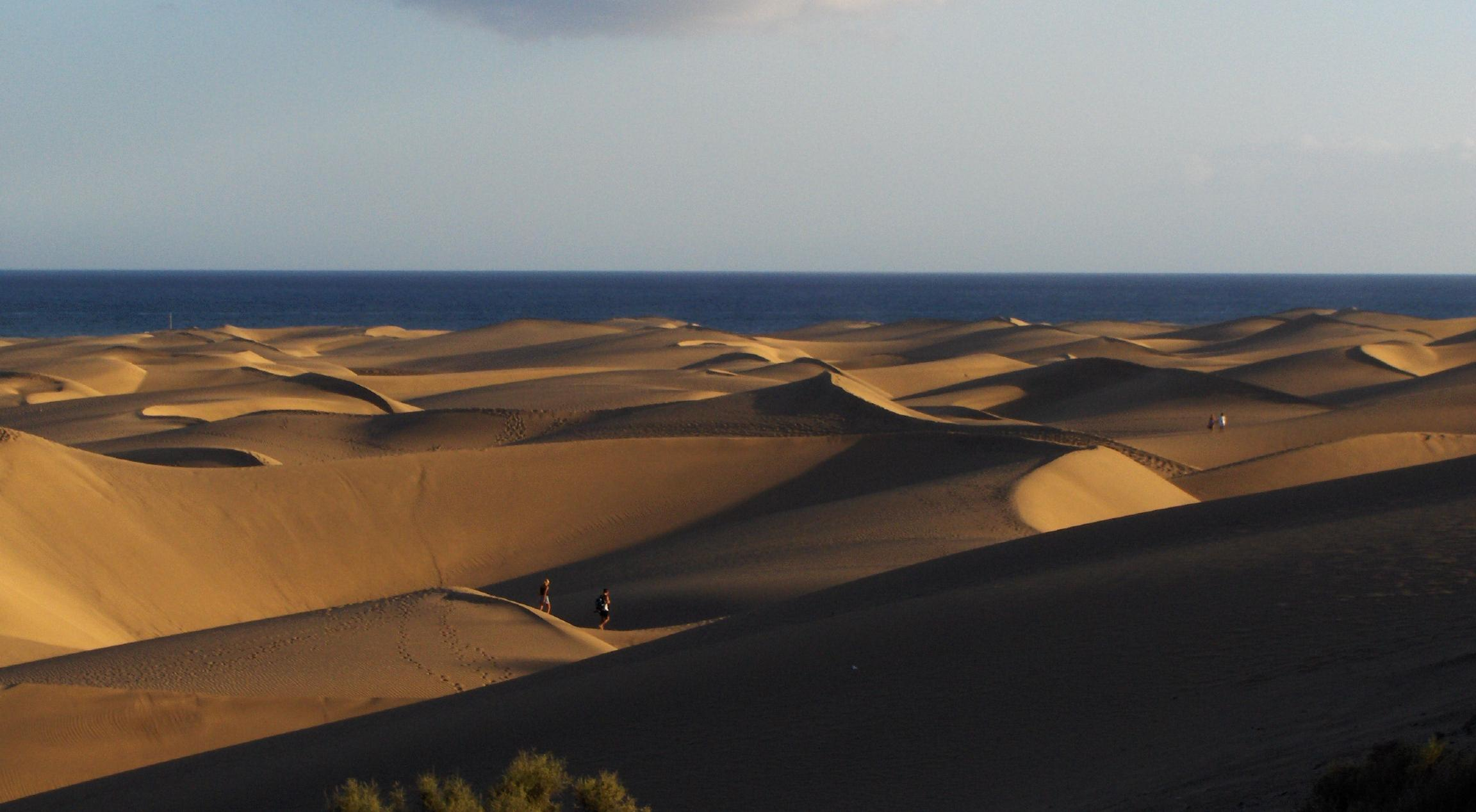
Maspalomas Dunes

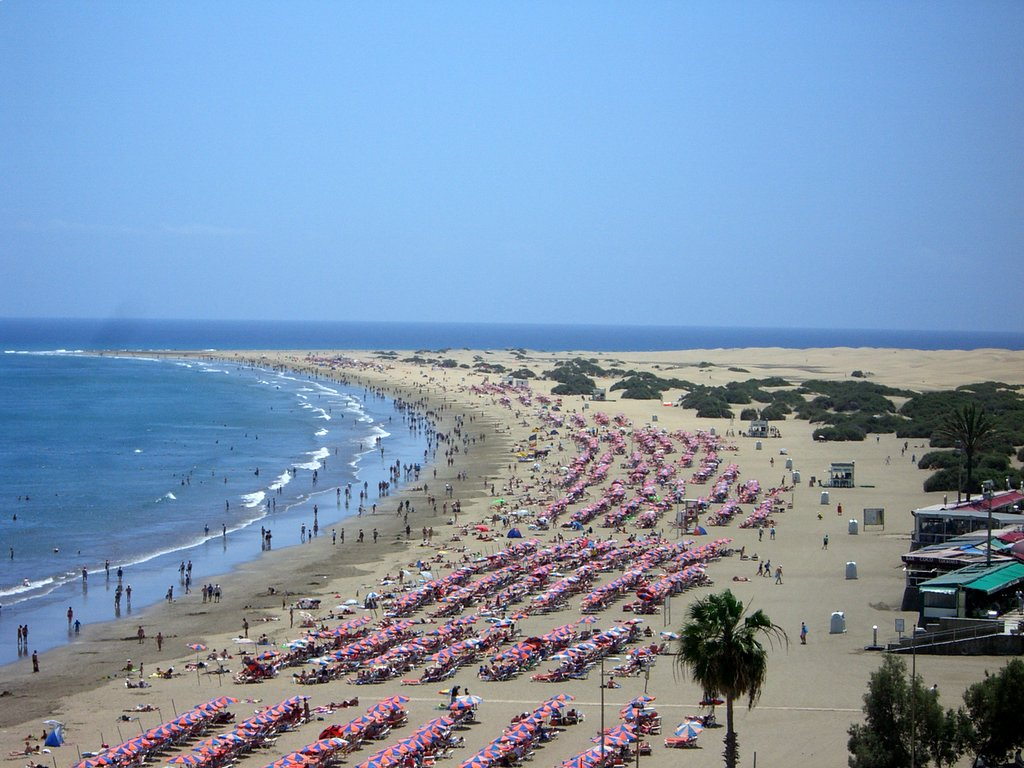
The beach of Playa del Inglés

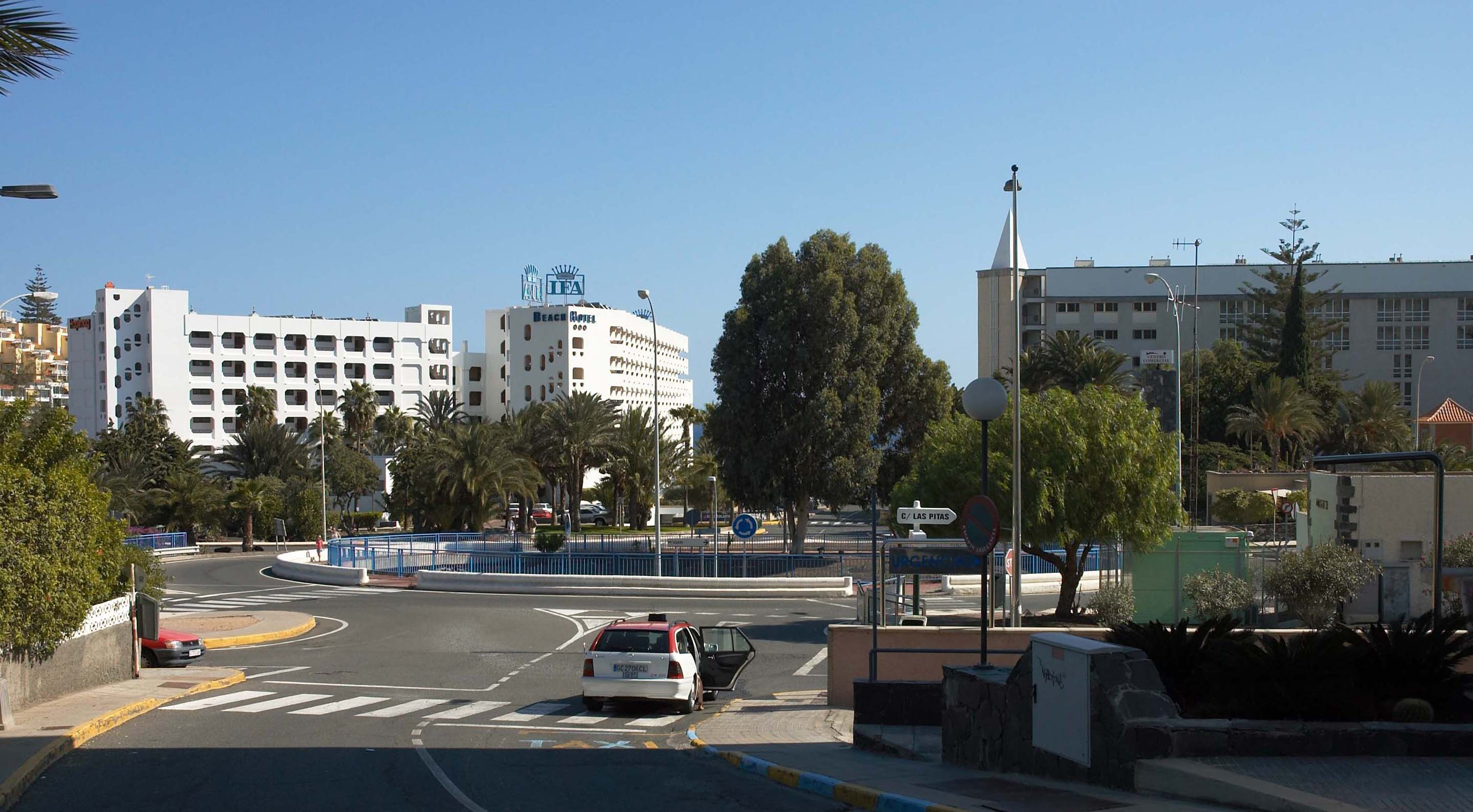
Hotels in San Agustín

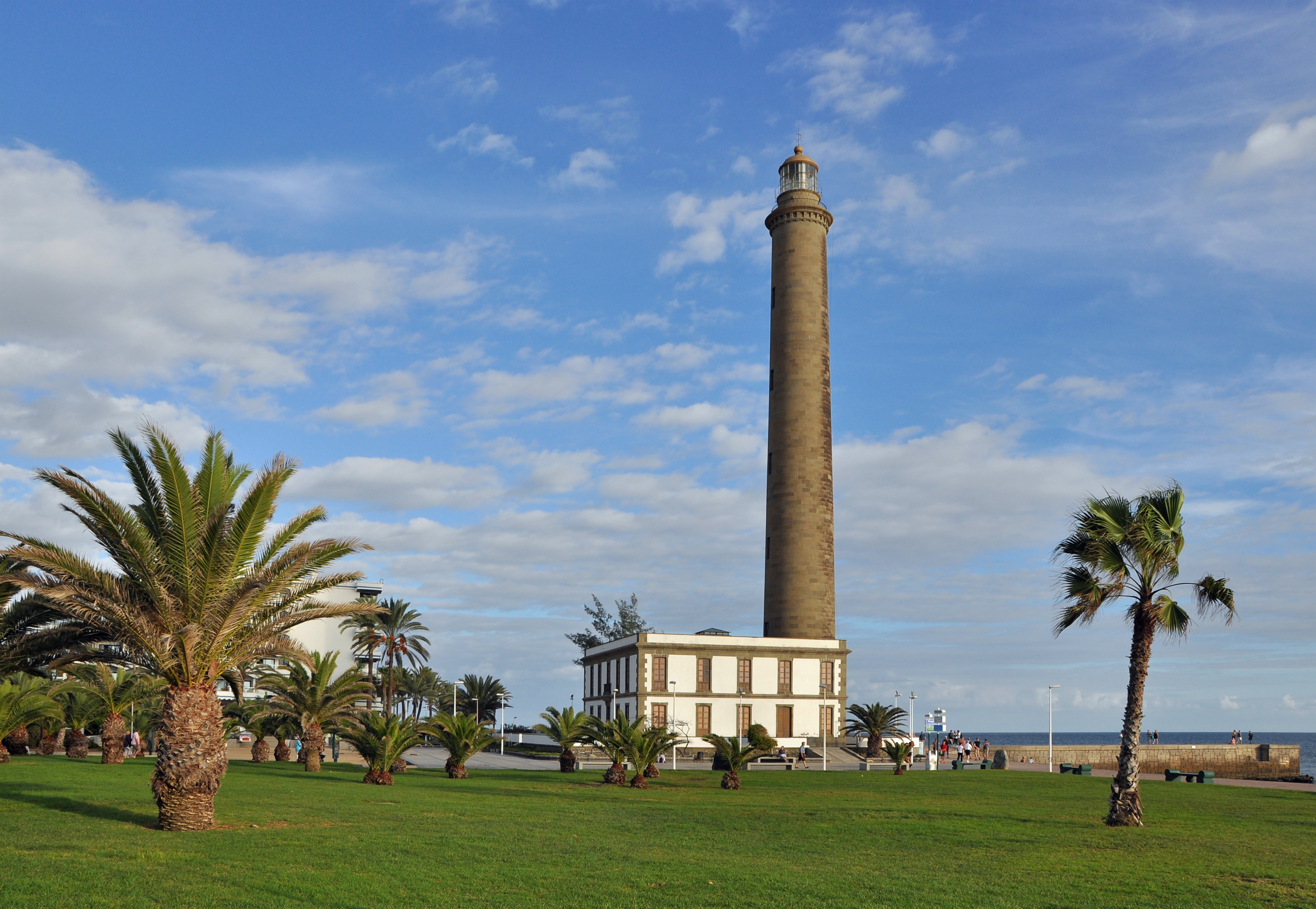
Maspalomas Lighthouse

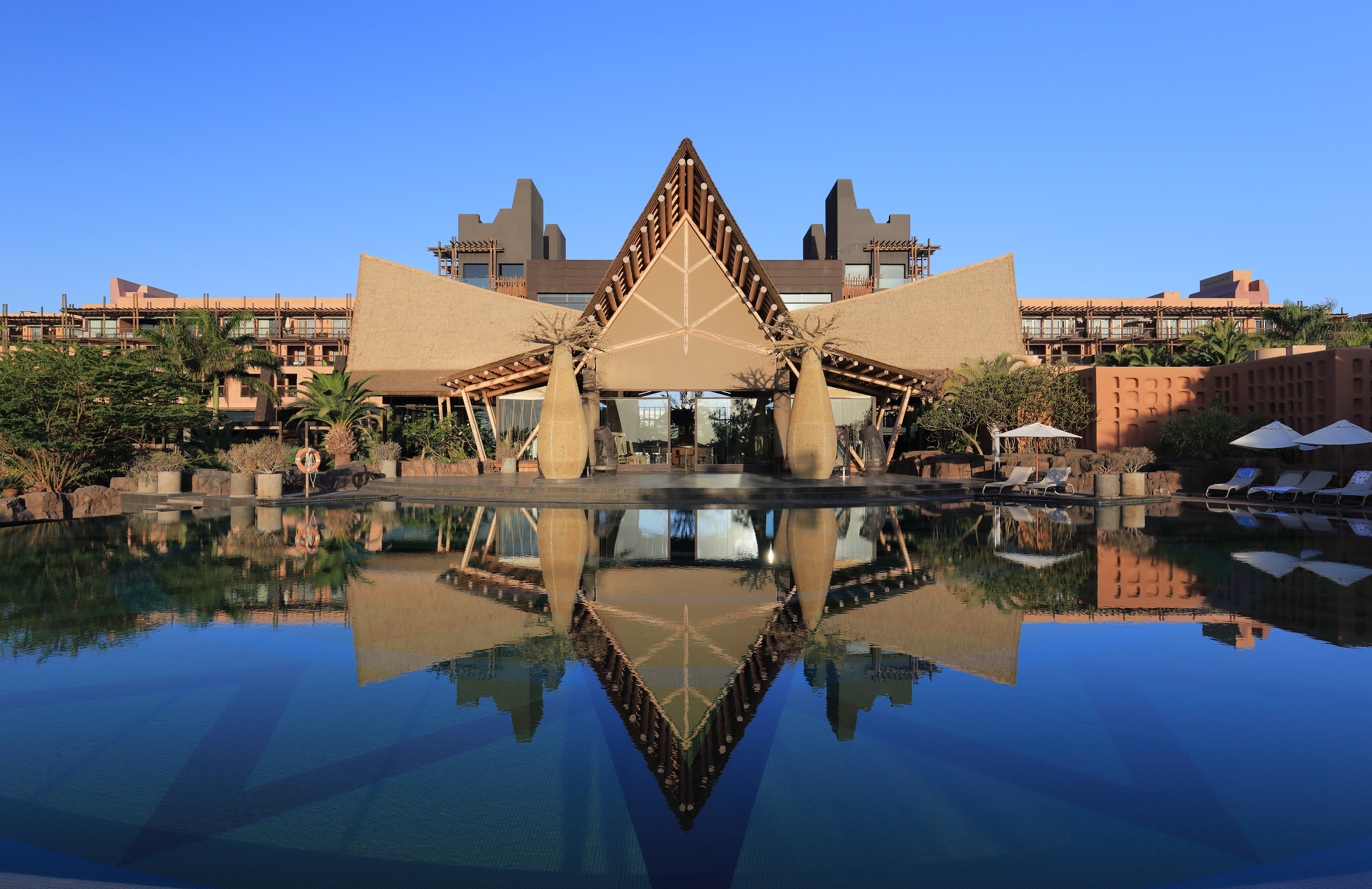
Lopesan Baobab Resort

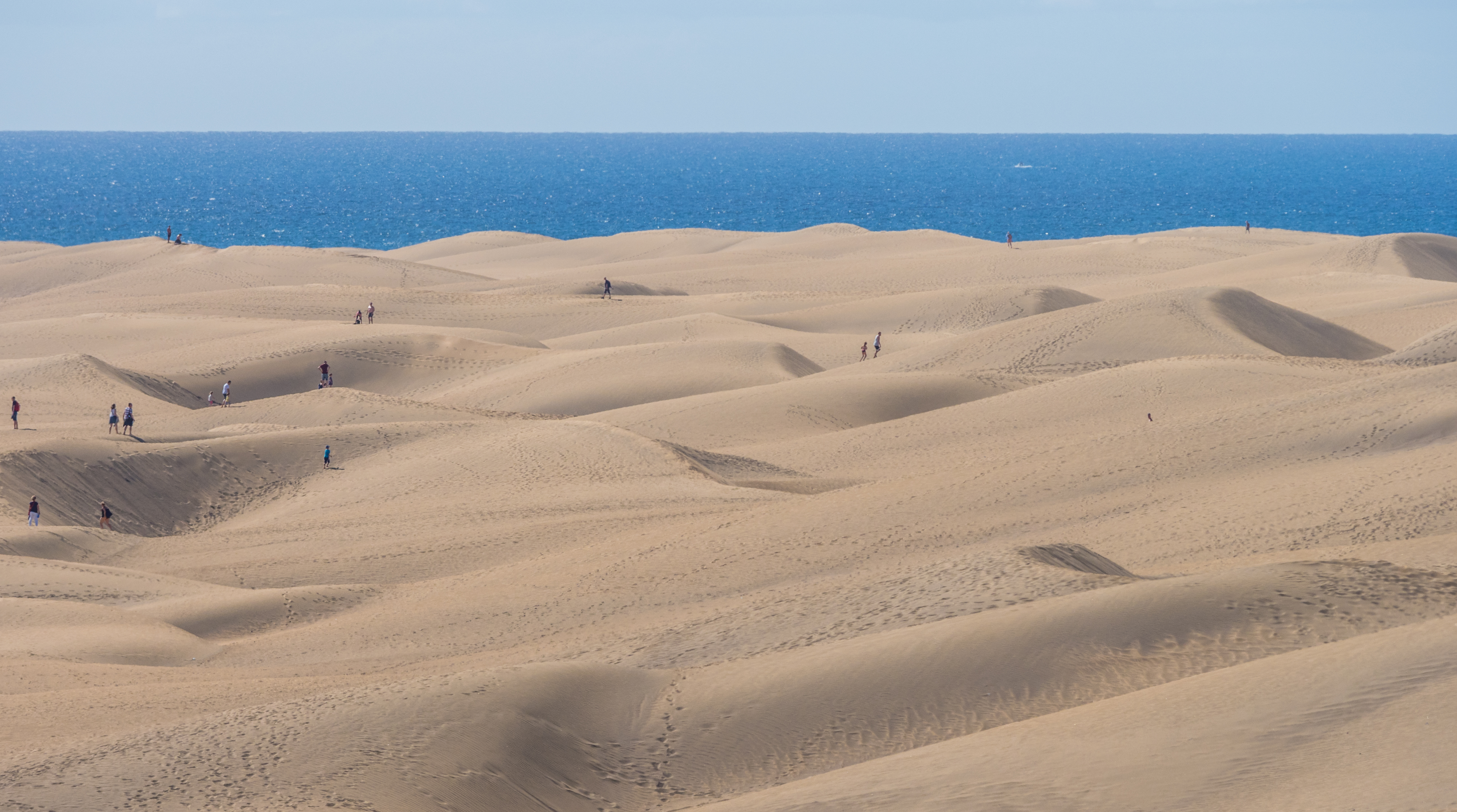
Sand dunes at Maspalomas

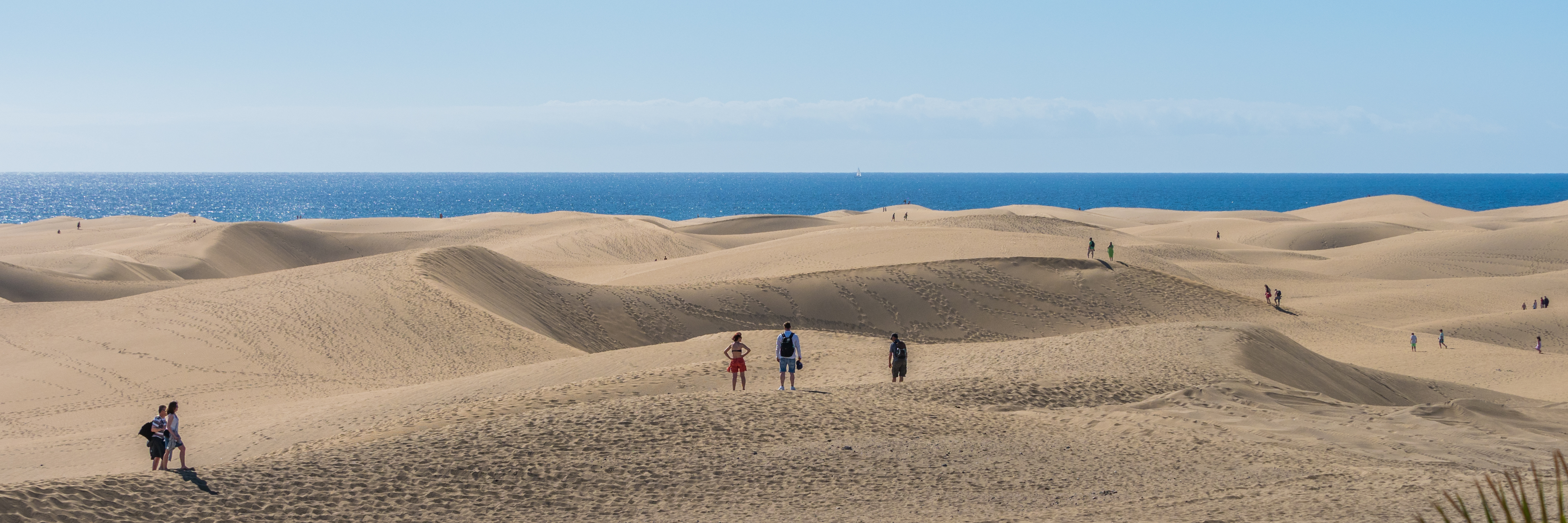
Sand dunes at Maspalomas
