= San Agustin, Las Palmas =

Seaside resort in Gran Canaria, Spain

Coordinates: 27°46′16″N 15°32′43″W

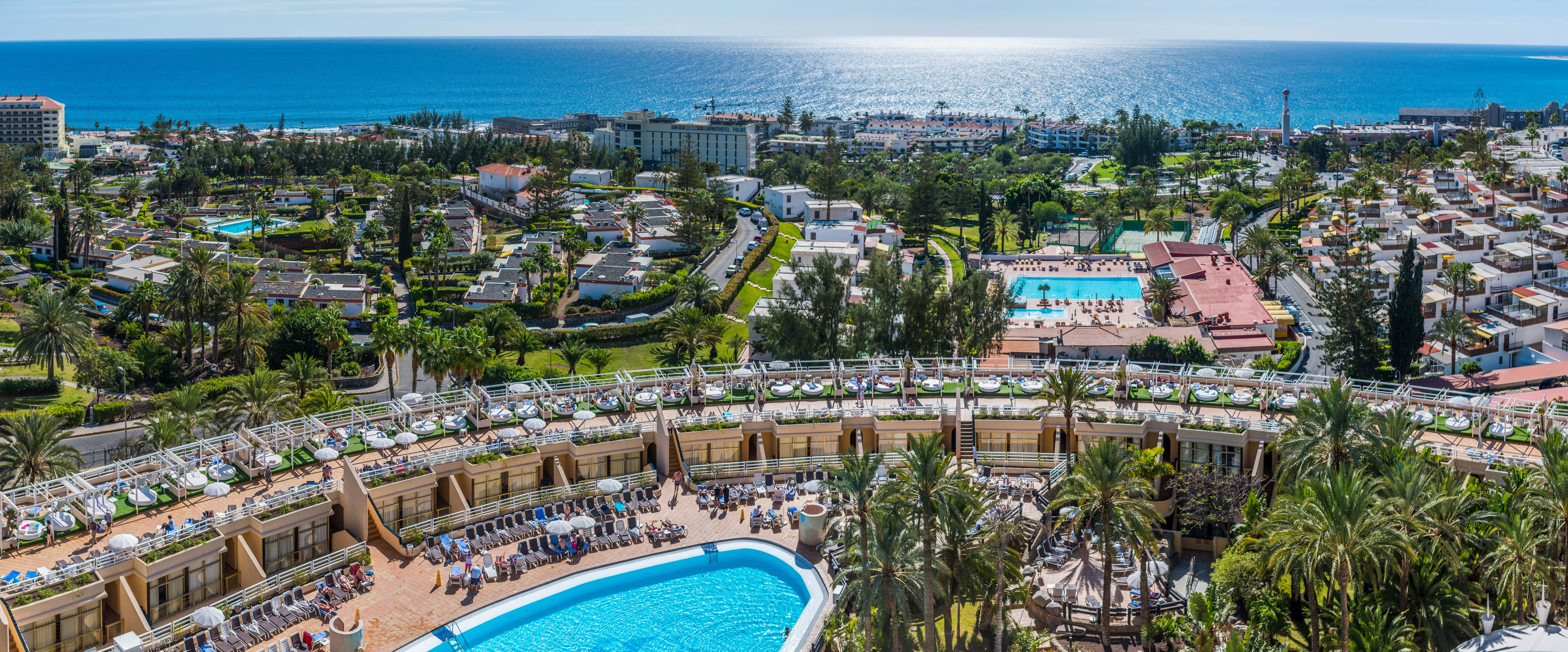
San Augustin 2018

San Agustín is a sea resort on the south coast of the island of Gran Canaria, Canary Islands, Spain. It is part of Maspalomas, in the municipality of San Bartolomé de Tirajana. The GC-1 motorway connects it with the airport and the province capital Las Palmas.

San Agustín, still a modest resort community, was one of the first resort developments of what would later be known as Maspalomas among the fast growing resorts on the southern part of Gran Canaria from Maspalomas to Puerto de Mogan.
