= Fataga =

- Village
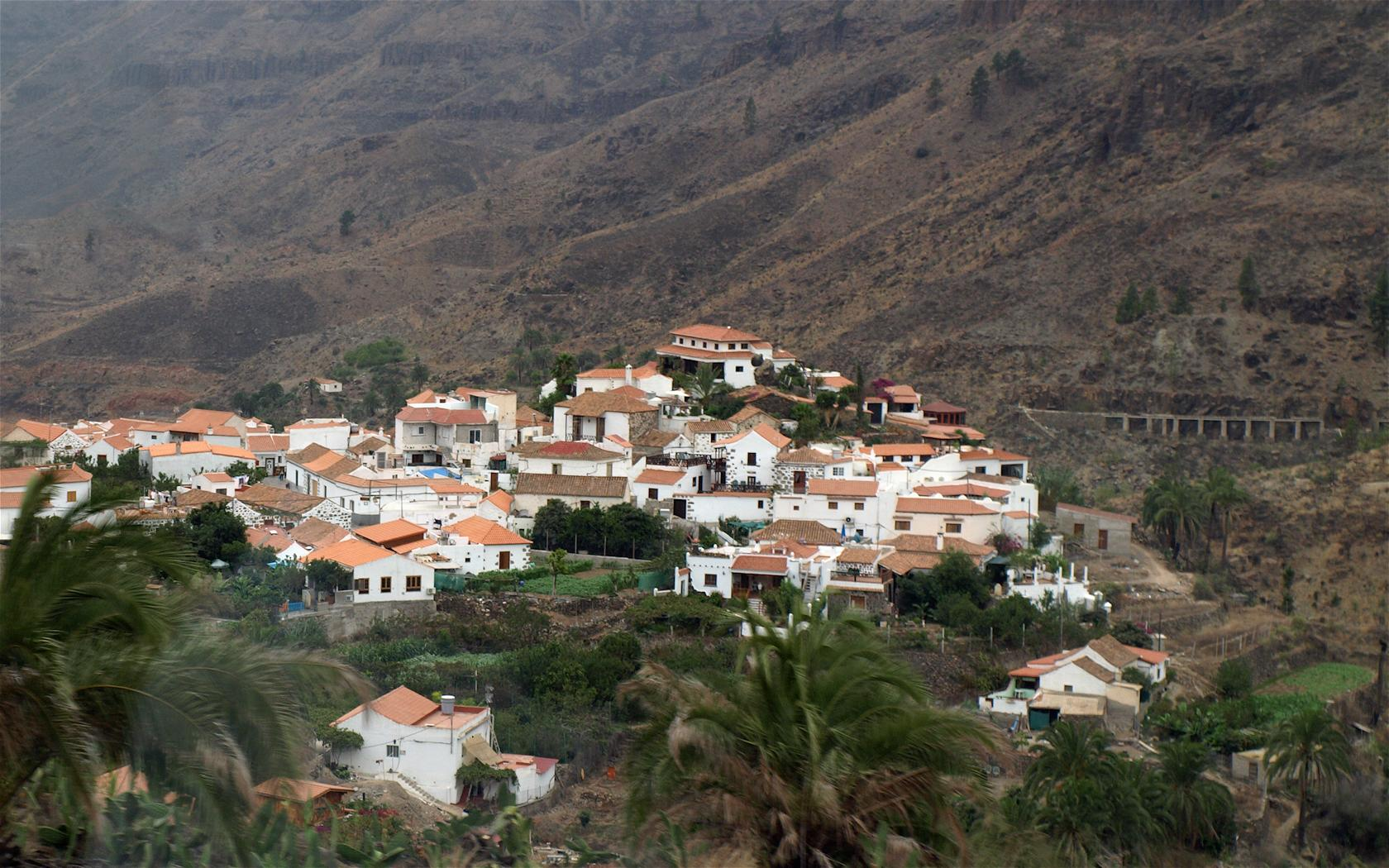
- Fataga, with the canal de Fataga on the right

- Location in Canary Islands
- Coordinates: 27°53′15.3816″N 15°33′53.4528″W
- Country: Spain
- Autonomous Community: Canary Islands
- Province: Las Palmas
- Island: Gran Canaria
- Municipality: San Bartolomé de Tirajana
- Elevation (AMSL): 600 m (2,000 ft)
- Time zone: UTC+0 (CET)
  - Summer (DST): UTC+1 (CEST (GMT +1))
- Area code: +34 (Spain) + 928 (Las Palmas)
- Website: www.maspalomas.com

Fataga is a village in the municipality of San Bartolomé de Tirajana on the island of Gran Canaria (Canary Islands, Spain).

== History ==
The village can trace its origins back for more than 2000 years, when the area was inhabited by the Guanche natives.

The village became known as Adfatagad in the 16th century, around the time when the struggle for control of the Canary Islands between the Guanches and the Spanish was taking place. Many of the battles in the final stages of this conflict took place in and around the Barranco de Fataga.

By the end of the 19th century, Fataga had some 650 inhabitants, dedicated to the farming of cereals, vegetables and fruits, as well as cattle. At that time it was a self-sufficient farming community, owing its prosperity to the water source known as "El Cercado de Fataga" (The Orchard of Fataga) or "Fuente Grande" (Great Spring).

== Description ==
Fataga is a very popular day-trip destination for holidaymakers staying in the coastal regions of Gran Canaria. It is a characteristic village of the island, with its old narrow lanes paved with stones and famous historic Canarian houses. It is a candidate for a listing as World Heritage Site. The village is in Fataga ravine (barranco de Fataga), an environment of brown rocks strewn with green known as the "valley of the thousand palms".

The church, dedicated to St. José, was built in 1880. In the period up to the present day new farms and houses were built, often growing fruits such as oranges, lemons, apricots and grapes. However the population of the village has now dropped to around 265.

Fataga has three restaurants, tourist areas, one of the oldest bakeries on the island and a watermill. Little artisan shops can be found near the church as much as near the bakery. Lastly but not least, the Arteara necropolis is halfway up from Maspalomas in Arteara.

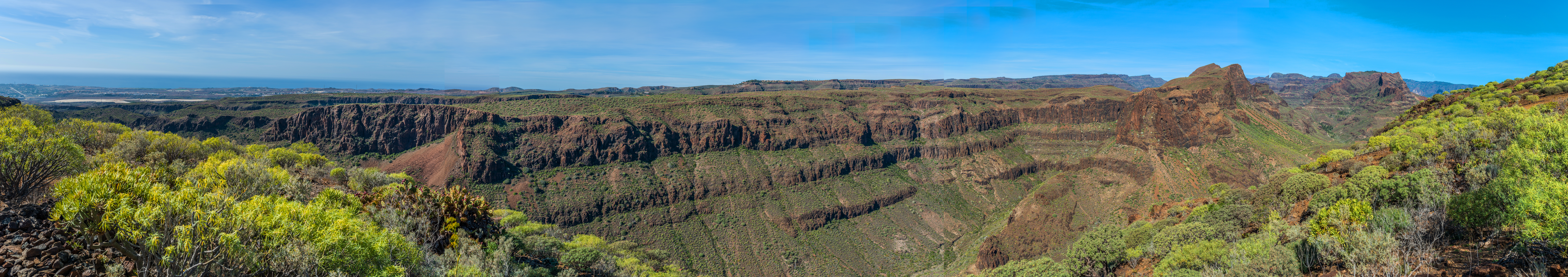
Barranco de Fataga 2016

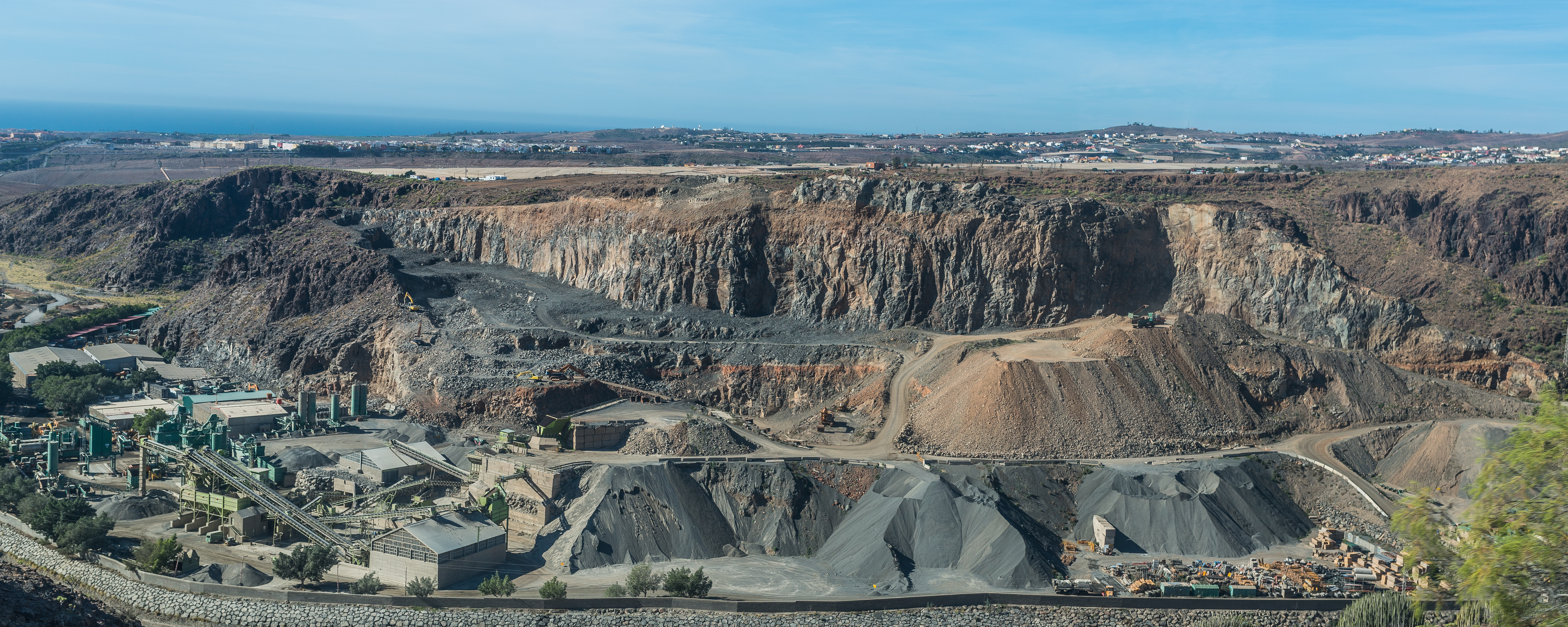
Fataga ravine

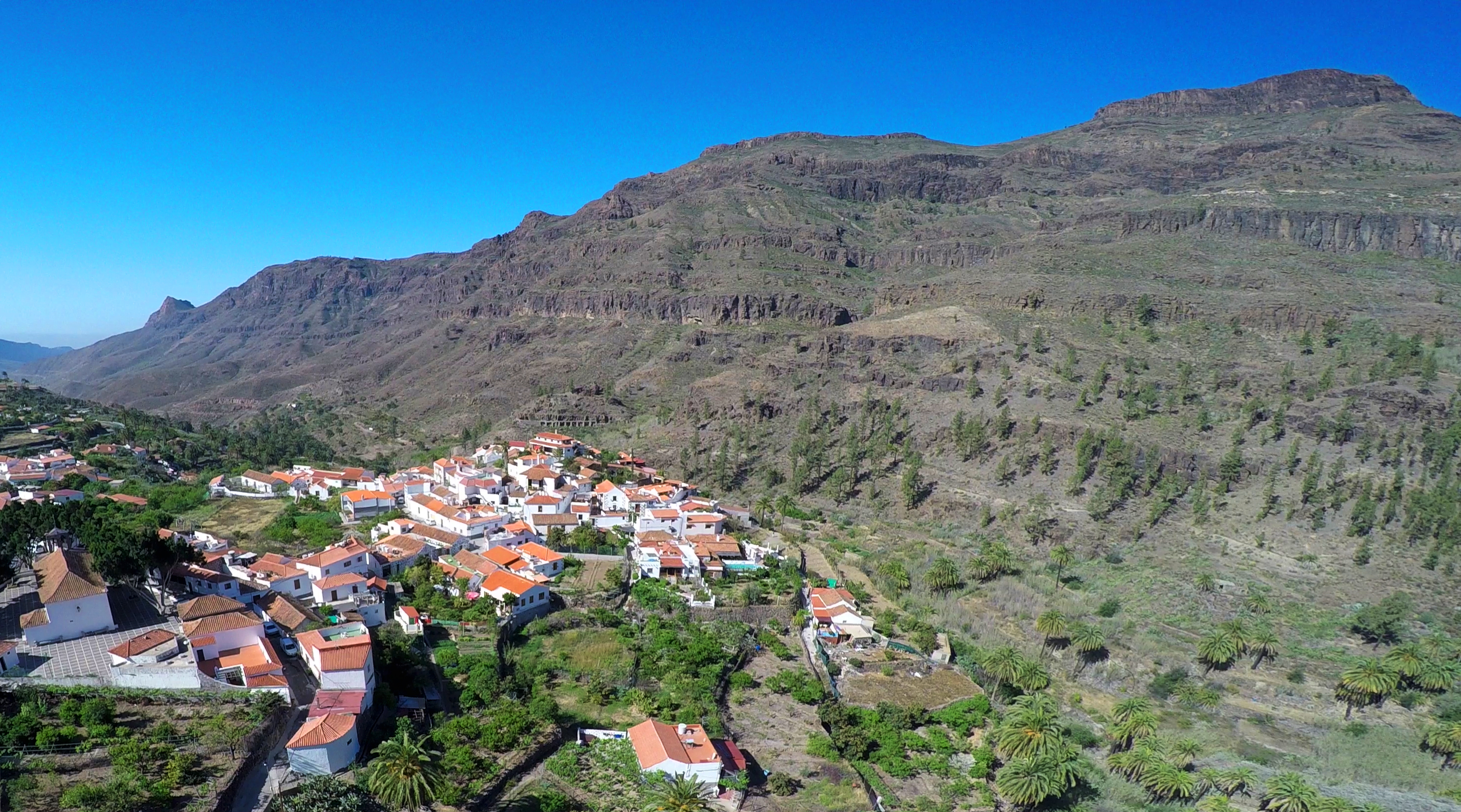
View of Fataga

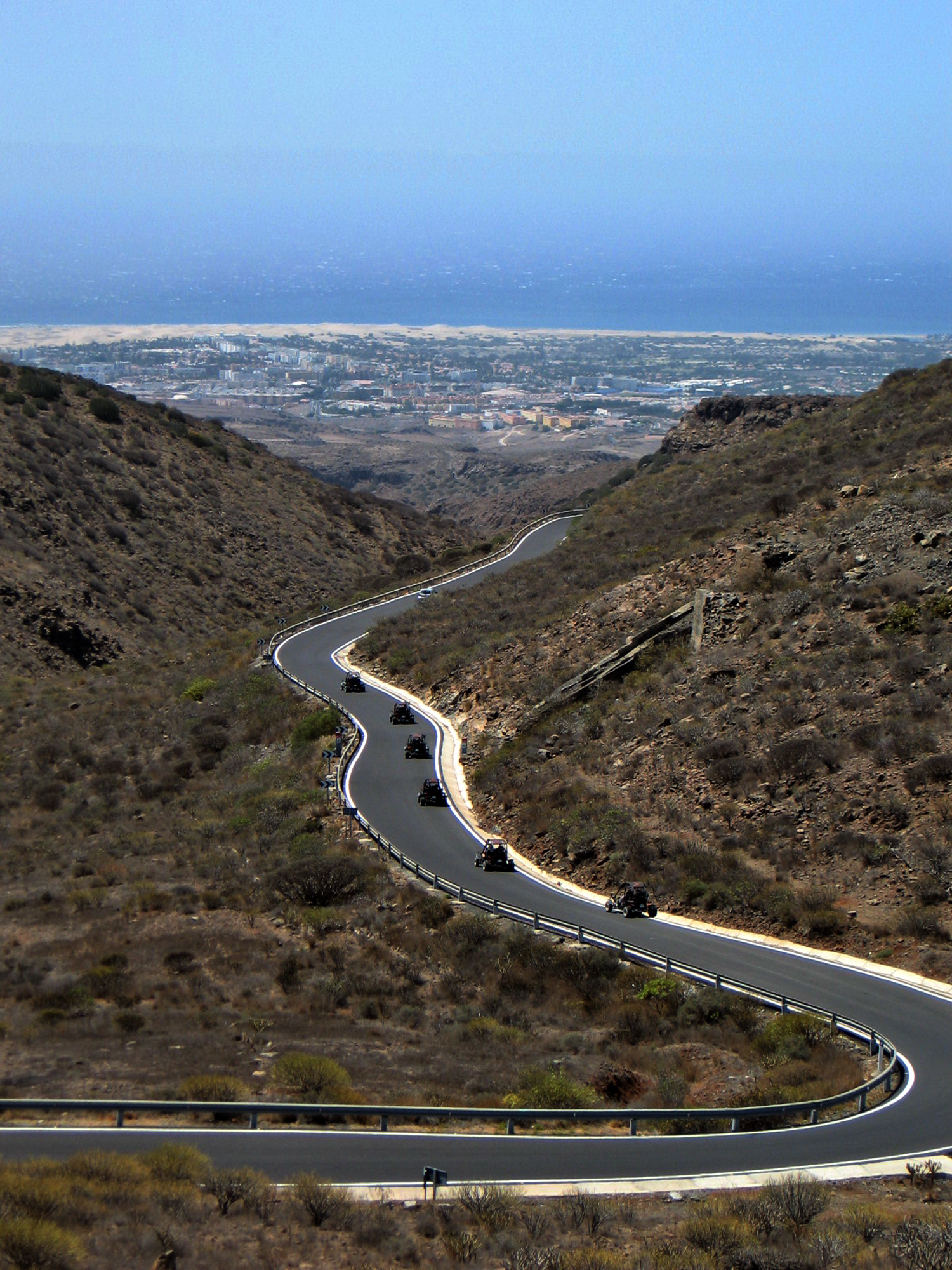
View from the panoramic area of Degollada de las Yeguas

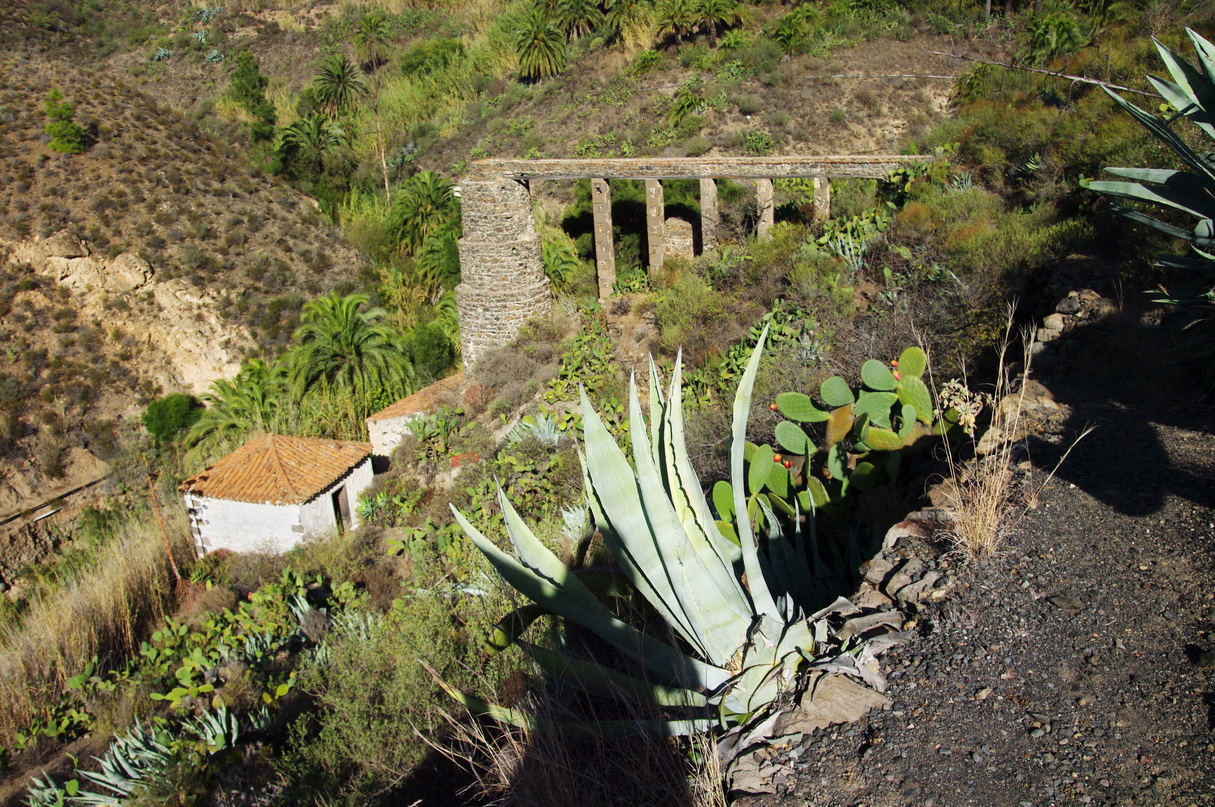
Fataga water mill

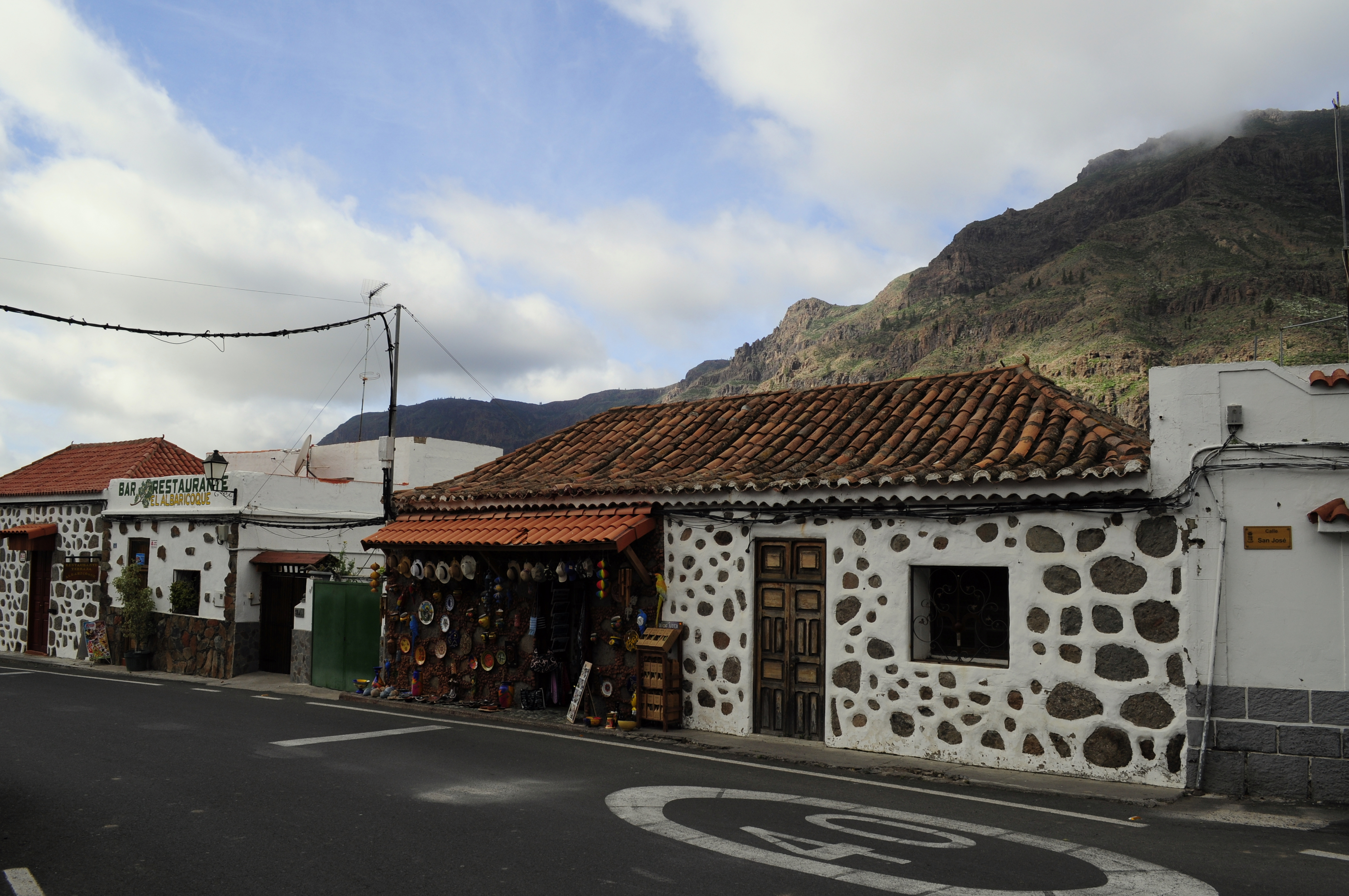
In the village

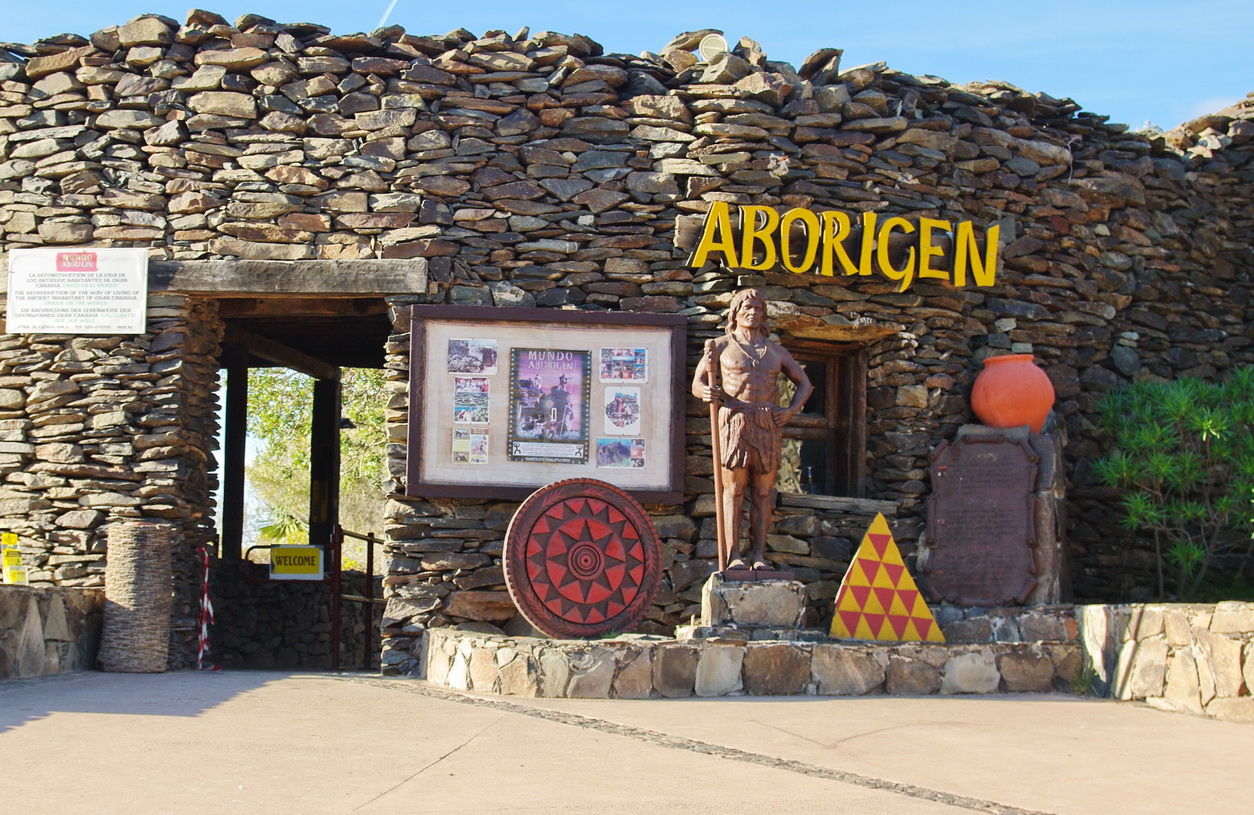
Museum

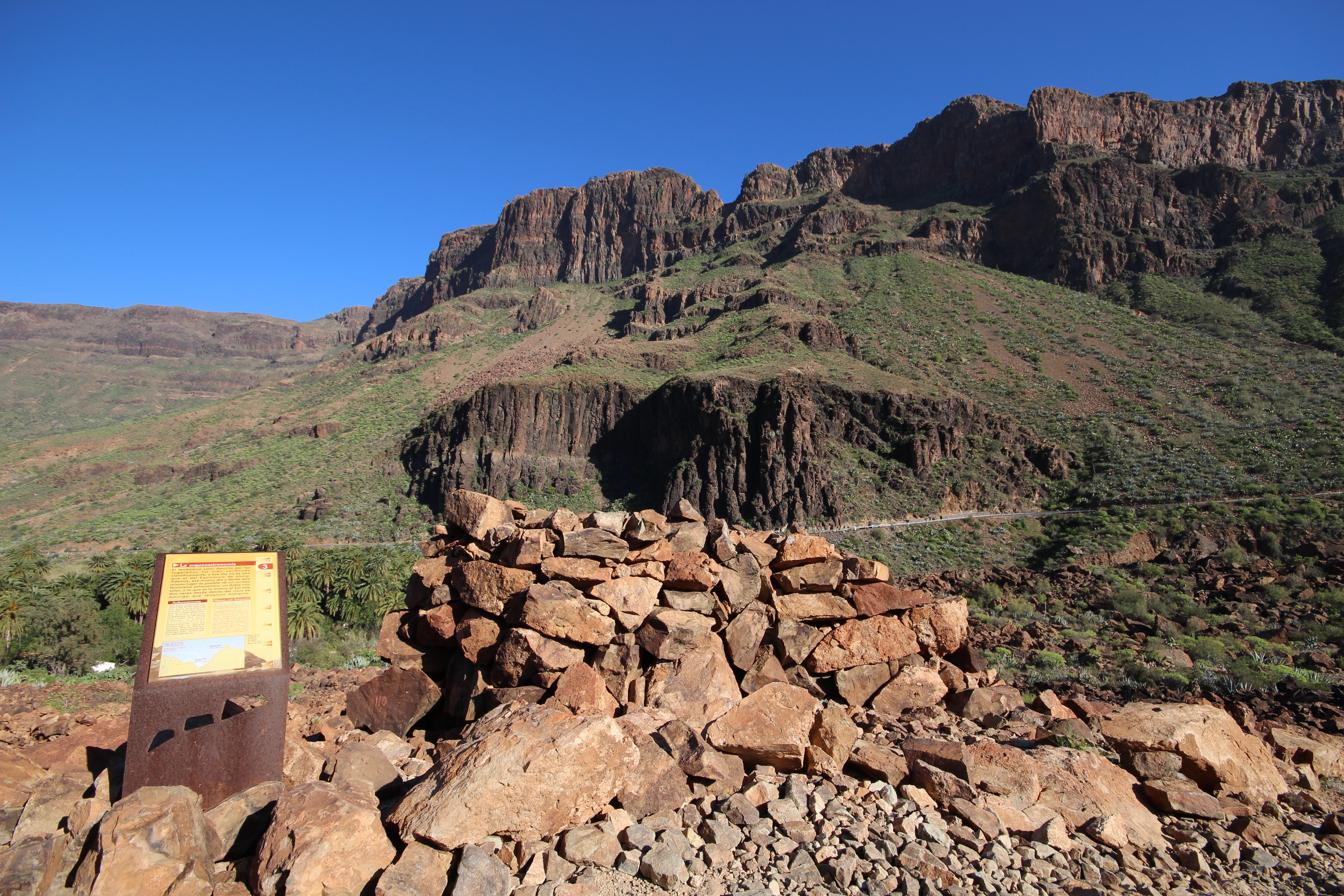
The King's tumulus in the Arteara necropolis
